= Narcisa de Jesús =

Ecuadoran virgin and saint (1832–1869)

Saint Narcisa de Jesús TOSD
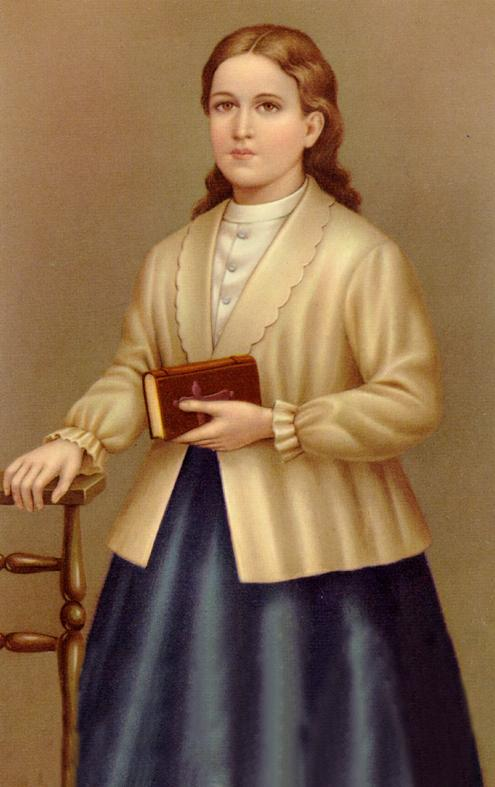

Virgin
- Born: Narcisa de Jesús Martillo Morán; 29 October 1832; Nobol, Guayas, Ecuador
- Died: 8 December 1869 (aged 37); Lima, Peru
- Venerated in: Catholic Church
- Beatified: 25 October 1992, Saint Peter's Square, Vatican City by Pope John Paul II
- Canonized: 12 October 2008, Saint Peter's Square, Vatican City by Pope Benedict XVI
- Major shrine: Santuario de Santa Narcisa de Jesus Martillo Morán, Ecuador
- Feast: 30 August

Narcisa de Jesús Martillo Morán (29 October 1832 – 8 December 1869) was an Ecuadorian virgin and Dominican tertiary in the Roman Catholic Church. Martillo was known for her charitable giving and strict devotion to Jesus Christ while living a virginal and austere life of prayer and penance. Her devotion to prayer and the mortification of the flesh was strong and it led her to the decision to live as a member of the Third Order of Saint Dominic in Patrocínio (Peru), where she died on 8 December 1869. Narcisa de Jesús was beatified on 25 October 1992.

== Life ==
Narcisa de Jesús Martillo Morán was born on 29 October 1832 in the small village of San José in Nobol in Ecuador as the sixth of nine children born to Pedro Martillo and Josefina Morán who were landowners. Her father was a great worker to the point that he amassed considerable wealth; he had a devotion to Ss. Mary Anne de Paredes and Hyacinth of Poland.

Her mother died in 1838 and she took up much of the domestic chores as a result of this while an elder sister and teacher taught her to read and write as well as to sing and use the guitar; she also learned how to sew and cook. The girl also turned a small room in her house into a domestic chapel. She received her confirmation on 16 September 1839.

Martillo frequented a small wood near her home for contemplation in solitude, while the guava tree near which she went to is now a large pilgrimage destination. The girl also chose Mariana de Jesús as her patron saint with whom she identified and strove to imitate in her own life. Martillo was known for being sweet and thoughtful with a peaceful and generous disposition; she was obedient to those around her and was well-known and loved in her village. Martillo was blonde with bright blue eyes and was strong and agile; she was also tall.

The death of her father in January 1852 prompted her to relocate to Guayaquil, where she lived with prominent nobles, and it was here that she began her mission of helping the poor and the sick and caring for abandoned children. It was also here that she took a job as a seamstress in order to fund her mission as well as supporting her eight brothers and sisters. But she soon moved to Cuenca for some months where she went from home to home and lived with whoever would take her in including Mercedes de Jesús Molina, to allow herself greater time for silent contemplation and penance. In 1865 her spiritual director fell ill, and died in 1868, which was at the time the local bishop invited her to live with the Discalced Carmelites, but discerned that her vocation was another.

In June 1868 she relocated to Lima in Peru at the advice of her new Franciscan spiritual director Pedro Gual where she lived with the Dominicans at Patrocinio despite not being a member of the convent. It was here that Narcisa followed a demanding schedule of eight hours of prayer and contemplation which was offered in silence and solitude. She fasted very strictly and was often seen in a state of ecstasy.

In late September 1869 she developed high fevers for which medical remedies could do little and she died as a result before midnight on 8 December 1869; upon her death a nun reported a pleasant and sweet odor filling the room that Martillo had died in. She died upon the opening of the First Vatican Council. In 1995, her remains were deemed upon exhumation to be incorrupt and were transferred from Peru back to her homeland of Ecuador until 1972, when they came to the village of Nobol (which is also called Narcissa de Jesús). On 22 August 1998, an altar containing her reliquary was dedicated.

== Beatification and canonisation ==
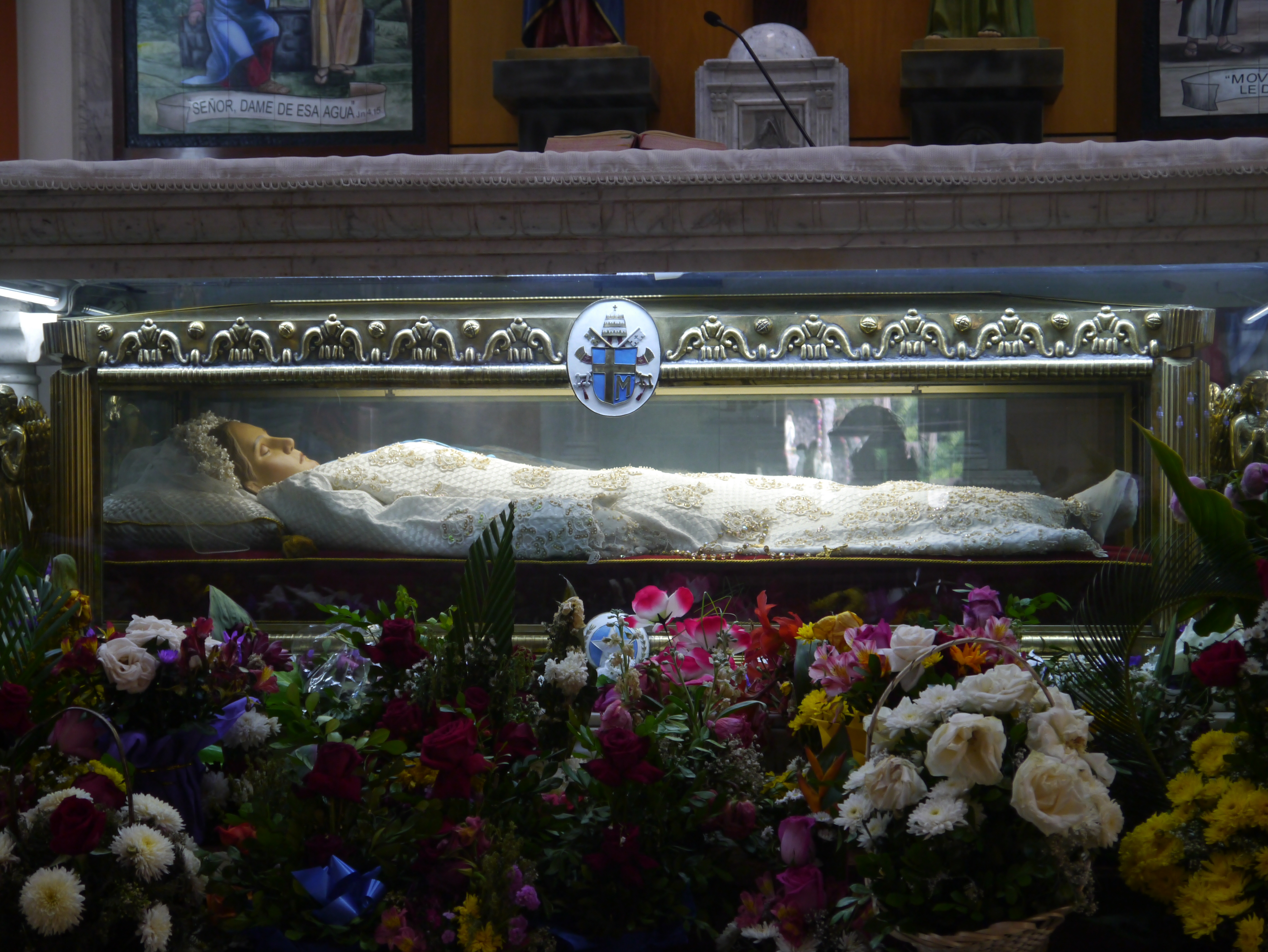
Altar with the relics in the sanctuary of Narcisa de Jesús in Nobol

Soon after her death pilgrims began praying at her tomb in Lima. The cause for her beatification commenced with the beginning of the informative process tasked with collecting documentation from 26 September 1961 until the process was closed on 10 July 1962 at which stage her writings received theological approval on 8 July 1965. The officials in charge of the cause sent the positio to the Sacred Congregation of Rites for investigation before historians approved the cause on 8 May 1974. The formal introduction to the cause came under Pope Paul VI on 27 September 1975 and the members of the Congregation for the Causes of Saints approved the cause as well in 1987. Martillo became titled as venerable on 23 October 1987 after Pope John Paul II acknowledged that she had lived life of heroic virtue.

A miracle due to her intercession was investigated in the beatification process in a diocesan tribunal. The Congregation for the Causes of Saints validated this process on 30 June 1984 while a panel of medical experts approved the miraculous nature of this healing on 27 June 1991. John Paul II approved the miracle on 7 March 1992 and beatified Narcisa de Jesús in Saint Peter's Square on 25 October 1992.

A second miracle, the miraculous healing of a seven year old child from a congenital defect in 1992, after she had prayed at the shrine of Narcissa de Jesús, received the Congregation's validation on 4 October 2002. Pope Benedict XVI approved the miracle on 1 June 2007 and canonised Narcisa de Jesús on 12 October 2008.
