= Church of La Compañía, Quito =

Jesuit church in Quito, Ecuador

Coordinates: 0°13′15″S 78°30′50″W

Church of the Society of Jesus Iglesia de la Compañía de Jesús (in Spanish)
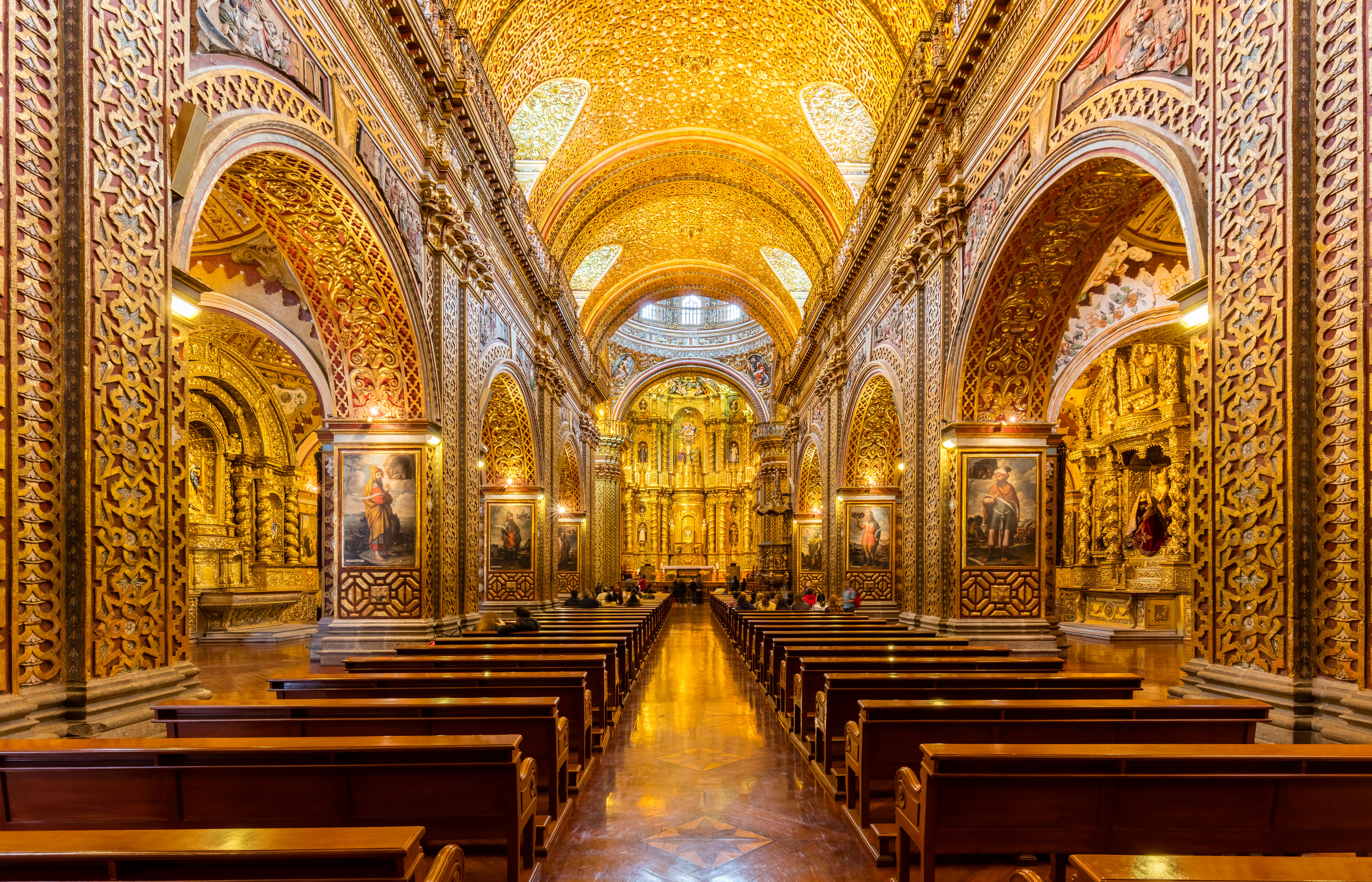
- Overview of the interior from the entrance.

Religion
- Affiliation: Catholic Church
- Rite: Roman Rite

Location
- Location: Quito, Ecuador
- Interactive map of Church of the Society of Jesus; Iglesia de la Compañía de Jesús (in Spanish)

Architecture
- Type: Church
- Style: Quitoan Colonial Baroque
- Groundbreaking: 1605
- Completed: 1765

Specifications
- Direction of façade: South
- Materials: Volcanic gray stone
- UNESCO World Heritage Site
- Type: Cultural
- Criteria: ii, iv
- Designated: 1978
- Parent listing: City of Quito
- Reference no.: 2

Website
- ficj.org.ec

The Church and Convent of San Ignacio de Loyola de la Compañía de Jesús de Quito, also known in the Ecuadorian people simply as La Compañía, is a Catholic clerical complex located on the corner formed by calles García Moreno and Sucre, in the Historic Center of the city of Quito, capital of Ecuador. The façade of its main temple is entirely carved in volcanic stone. Over time, this church has also been called: "Temple of Solomon of South America". Father Bernardo Recio, a traveling Jesuit, called it "Golden Ember".

The complex includes the Residencia San Ignacio, "Mother House" of the Jesuits in Ecuador. During colonial times, this "Jesuit block" housed the Seminario San Luis, the Colegio Máximo, the University of San Gregorio Magno and the Mainas Missions Office. Since 1862, the Colegio San Gabriel functioned on the block.

The church, and its rich internal ornamentation, completely covered with gold sheets, is one of the main tourist attractions in the city and an invaluable heritage, both artistic and economic, for the country. It was visited by Pope John Paul II, who presided over a mass in the church on January 30, 1985, within the framework of his three-day visit to Ecuador. It was also visited by Pope Francis on July 7, 2015, who prayed there before the image of Our Lady of Sorrows.

== History ==
The history of the construction of this church and its convent, goes back to the first years of the colony and the arrival of the Jesuit Order to the lands of the then Real Audiencia de Quito.

=== Background ===
The Jesuit Order arrived in the city of Quito on July 19, 1586, with the purpose of establishing a church, a college and a monastery in this city. In the first group of Jesuit priests were Juan de Hinojosa, Diego González Holguín, Baltasar Piñas and Juan de Santiago.

Most of the lots for the construction of churches had already been granted by the cabildo to the Franciscans, the Mercedarians, the Augustinians and the Dominicans. However, in 1587 the chapter gave the Jesuits a piece of land in the northwest corner of Plaza Grande, but the Augustinians showed their disagreement with the decision; for this reason the cabildo chose to establish them in another lot located in the south direction of the Cathedral. Little by little, and with the passing of the first years, the order acquired several neighboring plots through purchase until completing an entire block of great proportions, which extended from the south side of the current Palacio de Carondelet to what is now called Calle Sucre. and from Calle de las Siete Cruces (today García Moreno) to the east to the current Calle Benalcázar to the west.

The problem with the acquired land is that it was crossed by the Zanguña ravine, which descended from the Pichincha volcano and crossed behind the Quito Cathedral, so priest Marcos Guerra built several brick arches on it, in such a way that the ground remain at the same level and later the buildings of the College, the University, the residence of the Fathers, the House of the Students, the Hospital for the Elderly and the Procurement Center of the Mainas Missions in the Amazon could be raised without major problems.

In 1622 they inaugurated the University of San Gregorio, in the building attached to the church and which today constitutes the Centro Cultural Metropolitano, with the authorization of Pope Gregory XV, King Philip III of Spain and the authorities of the Audiencia. The university was endowed with modern laboratories, a library of 20,000 volumes that even admired the members of the French Geodesic Mission of 1736, and a first-rate faculty that included brilliant minds such as Juan Bautista Aguirre, Bernardo Recio, Caledonio de Arteta, Juan de Velasco and Francisco Sanna, among others. In 1630, the new Bishop of Quito, Friar Diego de Oviedo, wrote to King Philip IV: "In this province there has been a University and General Studies of the Society of Jesus, with very eminent subjects who have run their chairs. There are many notable ingenios, and the professors and teachers that the Company has in it are so great that they could be professors at Alcalá...".

It is therefore, in the midst of this scenario of knowledge and arts, that the church of La Compañía de Jesús de Quito was taking shape from its earliest sketches, until it became one of the masterpieces of world baroque.

== Construction ==
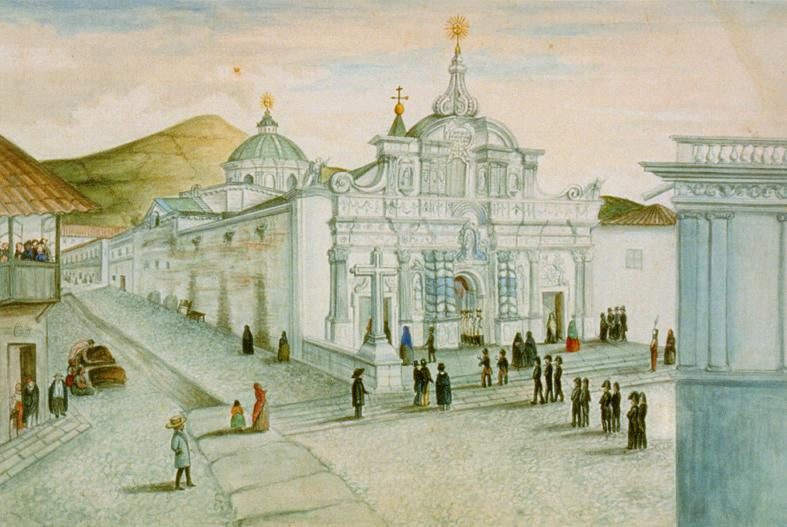
Church of La Compañía in 1855

In the year 1597 the Spanish priest Francisco Ayerdi takes charge of the construction work of the temple of the Jesuit Order in Quito, counting on the help of José Iglesias and José Gutiérrez. Unfortunately, and despite his good will, Ayerdi did not have the necessary knowledge for such a titanic undertaking, so the decision was made to replace him in 1605.

Between 1605 and 1614, the Italian priest Nicolás Durán Mastrilli received the plans for the church, which arrived from Rome and were approved by the Company; and begins to execute them with the help of the Basque architect Martín de Azpitarte, under the direction of the work of the also Jesuit Gil de Madrigal (Spaniard). By 1614, part of the work was already open for worship.

Priest Marcos Guerra arrived from Italy in 1636 to take charge of the construction, to which he imprinted the tastes and forms of the Renaissance, a style in which he had vast experience before becoming a clergyman. It was he who introduced the domes and barrel vaults, in addition to the side chapels decorated with domes. Guerra is also credited with the best altarpieces, the completely gold decoration, and the pulpit.

Other Jesuits who would collaborate in the work over the years would be Priest Sánchez, the priests Simón Schonherr and Bartolomé Ferrer. Priest Jorge Vinterer was the creator of the main altarpiece. In 1722 Priest Leonardo Deubler began construction of the impressive gray volcanic stone portico, which he could not finish because the work was suspended in 1725; Finally, in 1760, brother Venancio Gandolfi restarted work on the unfinished façade, which was completed on July 24, 1765. The building have representations of native flora and symbols of the ancestral peoples of the Ecuador.

Legend has it that King Philip IV, who ruled Spain in those years, worried about the immense cost of the work, would lean out of the top of the towers of his palace in El Escorial and look over the horizon to the west, saying: "The construction of that temple costs so much, that it must be a monumental work; then, its towers and domes must be seen from here”. The sovereign did not know that its value was not because of its size, but because of the beauty of its architecture, its construction and its wonderfully carved rich stones.

== Architecture ==
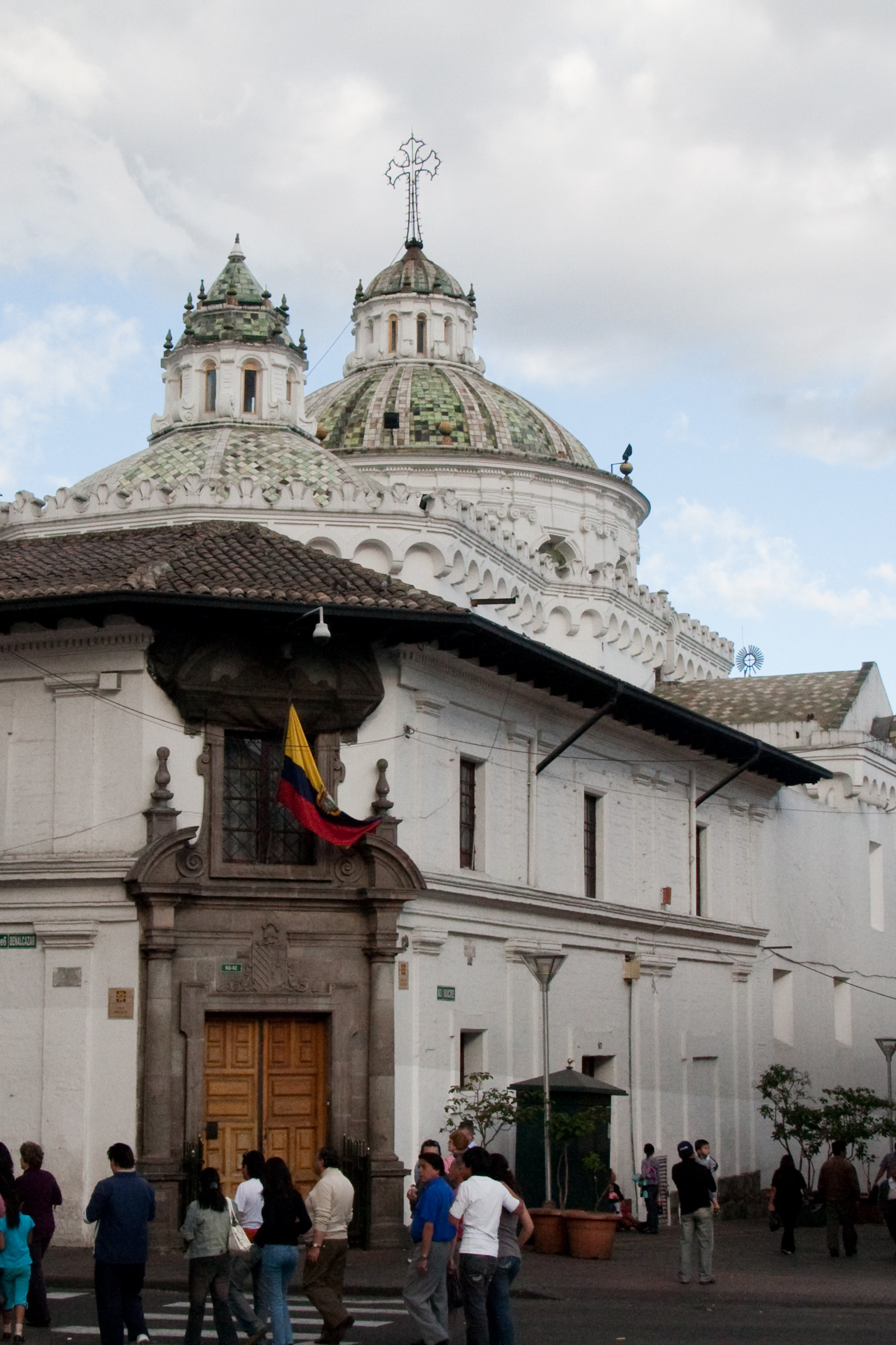
Facade

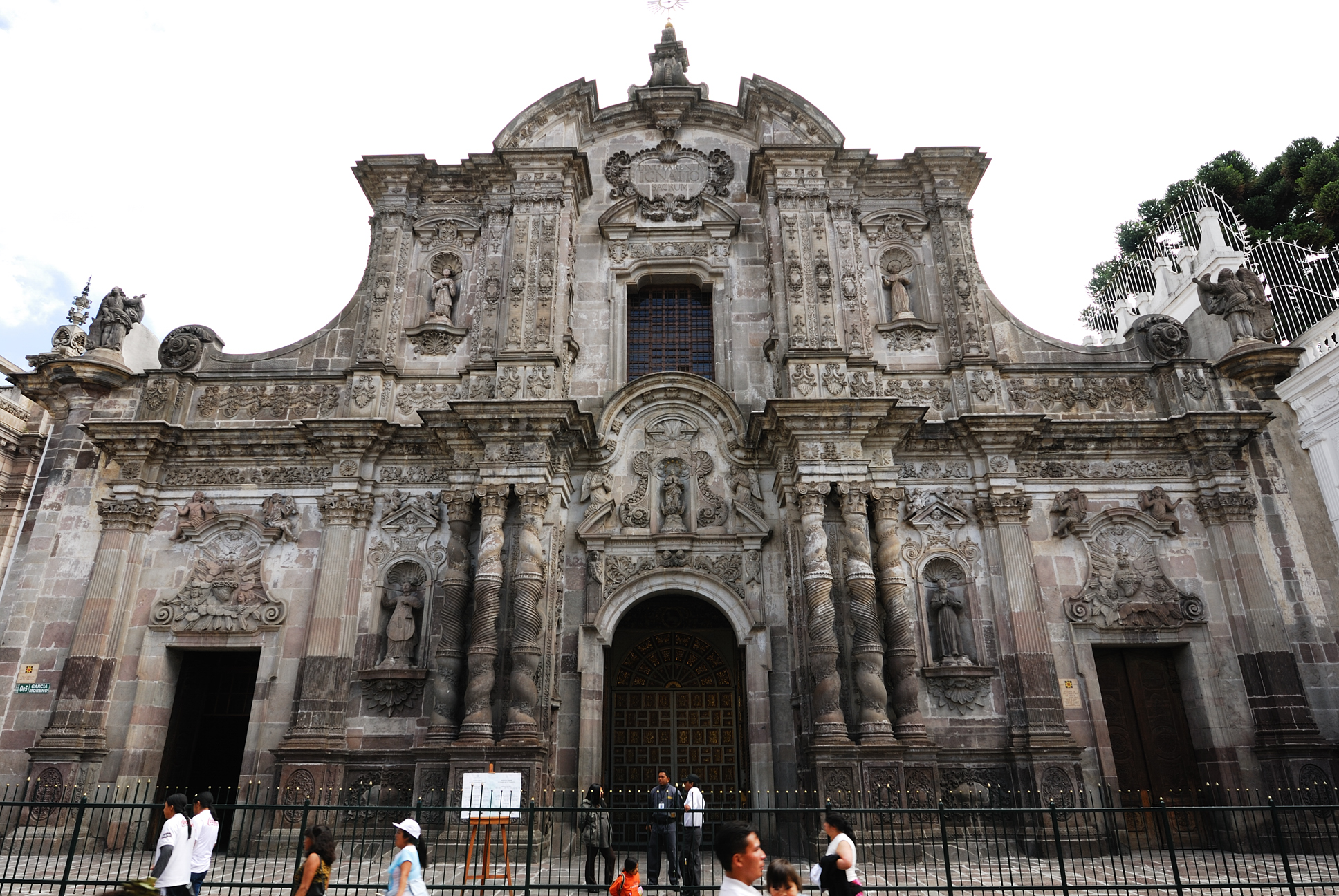
Facade of La Compañía de Quito

The church, having been built over 160 years and with different architects, handles four styles in its architecture, although Baroque art predominates. This is easy to appreciate due to the symmetry inside the church, since on each side of it there are the same number of elements; another of the particularities of this style is movement, a product of the way the main columns of the temple and the main altarpiece are designed, which produces the impression that it moves while walking inside the church. The luminosity is another of the peculiarities of the Baroque; the upper windows of the main nave are placed with such precision that they illuminate the entire church with sunlight.

Another of the styles that the church has is the Mudéjar, which is characterized by the geometric figures that can be seen on the pillars.

The third style that we can find in La Compañía de Quito is the Churrigueresque, with marked ornate decoration, and which is present above all on the screens of the church. Finally we find the Neoclassical style, which adorns the Chapel of Santa Mariana de Jesús, and which in the early years was a winery.

=== Plan ===
The plan of the church of La Compañía de Quito, commonly compared with that of the Church of the Gesù, in Rome, is that of a Latin cross inscribed in a rectangle, typical of the second stage of the Renaissance. It has a transept and three naves without galleries along the chapels: the central one, which is high and covered with a barrel vault, and the lateral ones, which are low and covered with domes. It is these details that precisely differentiate it from its Roman counterpart, since the Gesù has a single nave and galleries along the chapels; in fact, the only thing that resembles each other is in the dome over the crossing of the vaults that cover the nave of the Latin cross.

=== Naves and transepts ===
The central nave, 58m long by 26.5m wide, rests on solid square pillars that support the transverse arches joined laterally by semicircular arches, it also exhibits a balustrade and lunettes. The lateral naves, smaller in width and height, are enriched with small cupolas and airy cupolas that filter the light in a sacred semi-darkness. These naves house six side chapels or altarpieces, smaller than those of the transept, but of delicate elegance, unrepeatable variety and an exultant Baroque, already Plateresque and Churrigueresque. These are dedicated, in the north nave, to Saint Joseph, The Calvary and Saint Aloysius Gonzaga; while in the south nave to Virgin of Loreto, the Immaculate Conception and Saint Stanislaus Kostka.

The side chapels, covered with domes, are lit by small openwork windows, through which the light filters in dimly. Large flying buttress unload the thrust of the central vault on the strong exterior walls of lime and stone that delimit the church. The three naves are separated by two rows of pilasters, on which arches rest and on these, the walls of the central nave with the necessary windows for lighting. The material used is stone for the walls and pilasters, and brick for the arches and vaulting.

The transept, 26.5m wide, boasts an imposing dome 27.6m high and 10.6 in diameter, internally decorated with paintings, ornaments, medallions with figures of archangels and Jesuit cardinals. The twelve windows joyfully illuminate the decorations and the balustrade that the tholobate runs through. At the two ends of the transept rise the twin altarpieces, of Saint Ignatius of Loyola and Saint Francis Xavier, of enormous size and exquisite Baroque workmanship.

=== Domes ===
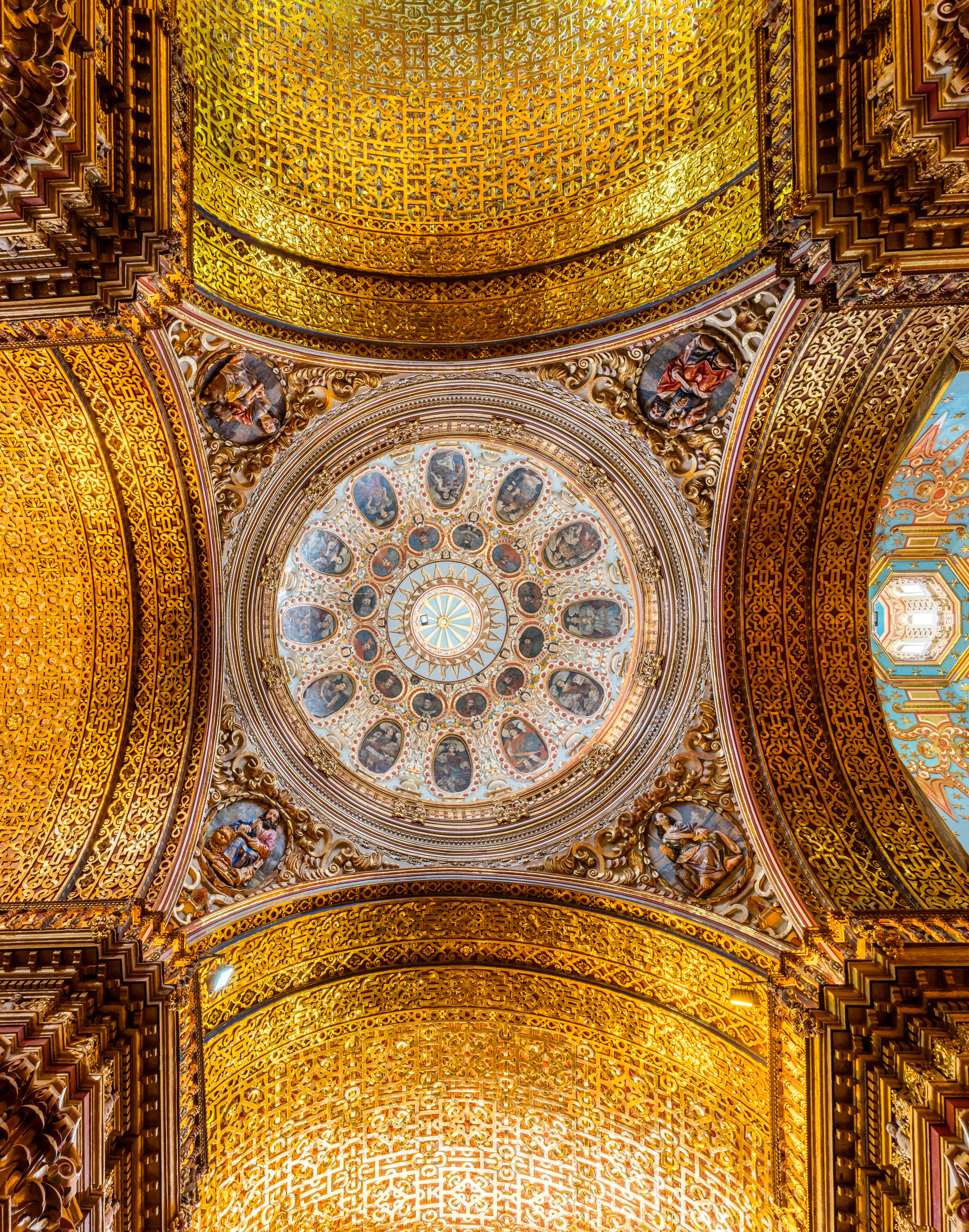
Interior view of one of the domes

The domes, from the outside, seem crushed because they are not raised by folding the cap, as was the custom widely used by the architects of the second period of the Renaissance. However, the one in the transept is graceful on a fretwork tholobate with zigzag arch windows, separated by twin Ionic pilasters, crowned with its elegant twelve-light lantern and standing out on a roof adorned with barbicans, a curious medieval reminiscence widely used in Quitoan architecture in the 17th and 18th centuries, when she was not remembered in Spain.

=== Facade ===
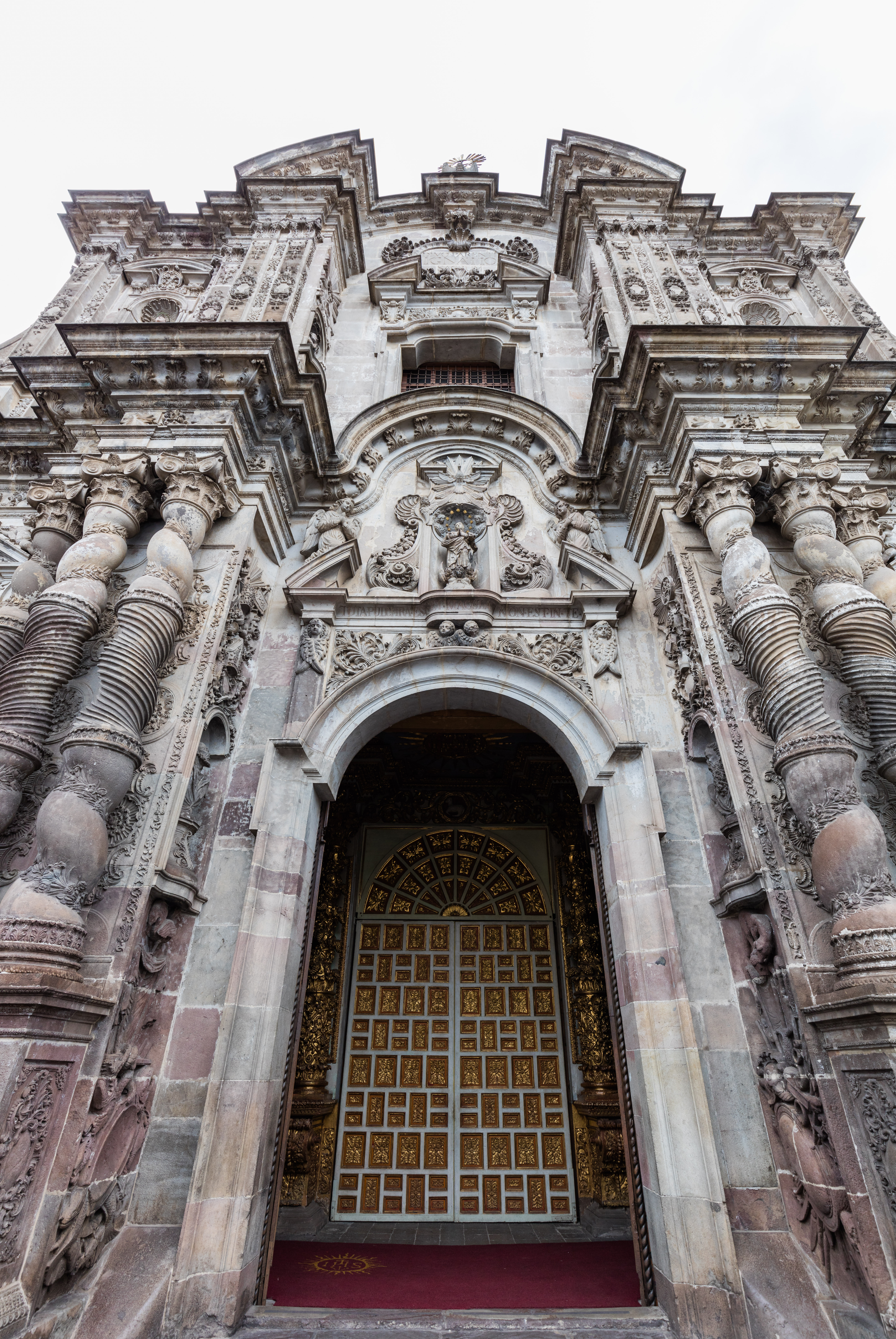
Detail of the facade of La Compañía de Quito

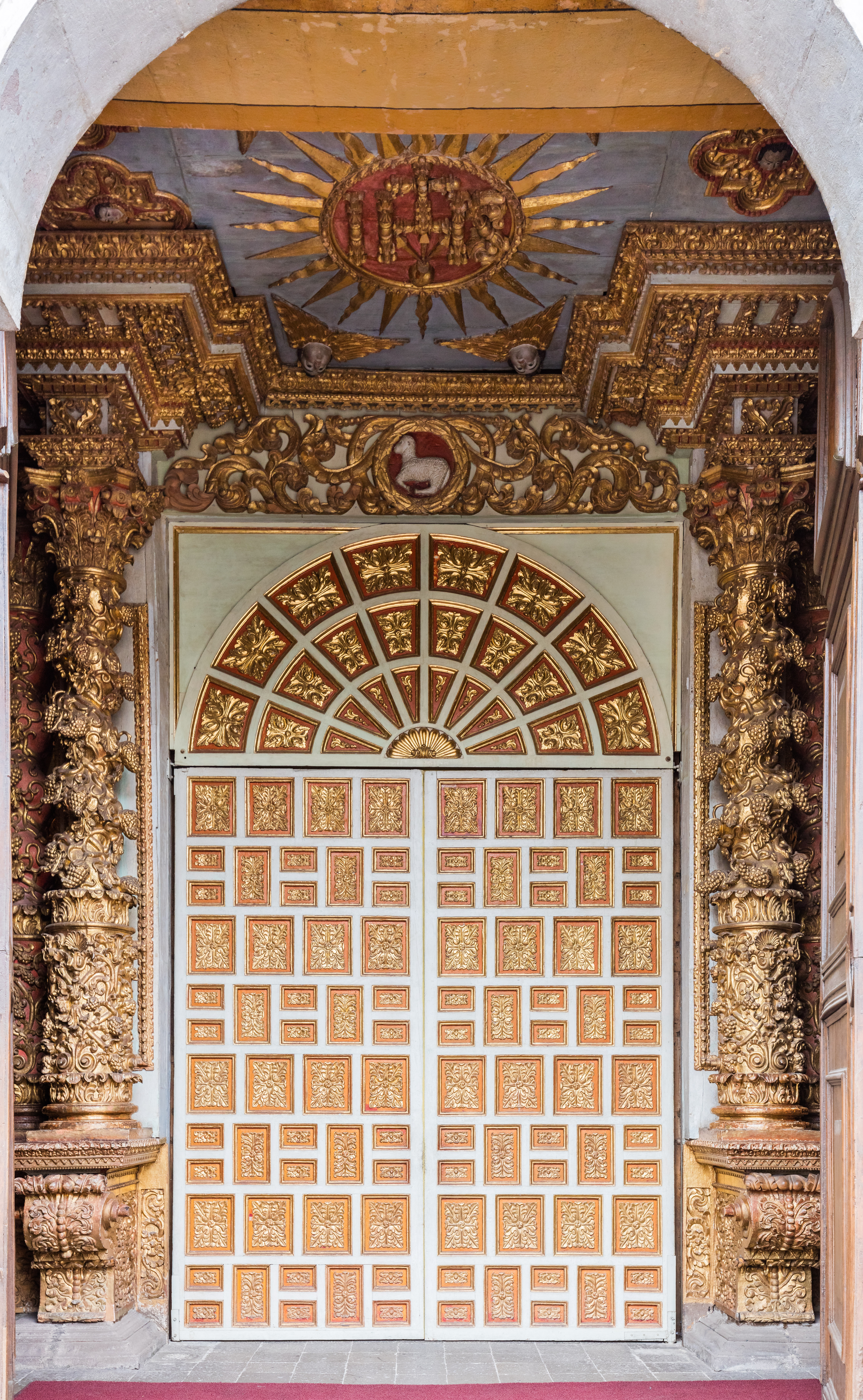
Door of the portal

The characteristic exterior façade of La Compañía de Quito is carved entirely in Ecuadorian andesite stone, and began in 1722 under the orders of Priest Leonardo Deubler, but the work was suspended in 1725 and then resumed in 1760 by priest Venancio Gandolfi, who it finished in 1765. According to José María Vargas: "The simple comparison of dates explains the difference in styles between the body of the church and the façade. While the structure of the temple betrays the Renaissance influence, which Priest Marcos Guerra brought to Quito from Italy; in the disposition of the frontispiece, it pays attention to the Baroque dynamism of the 18th century, which Bernini began with the twisted columns of the baldachin of Saint Peter's Basilica in Rome".

The columns, statues and large decorations were executed in the quarry that the Jesuits had in the Hacienda de Yurac, in the nearby parish of Píntag; the rest of the material was brought from a quarry on the western slope of El Panecillo hill, next to the city. The facade, as it has come down to us, has more of the Italian Baroque than the Spanish Plateresque and, in the high pilasters, with a certain French Baroque accent.

The main entrance door is flanked by six Solomonic columns five meters high, fluted in their middle third, derived from those of Bernini on the altar of the Confession of Saint Peter's Basilica in Rome. In the same way, the side doors are flanked by two Roman-Corinthian style pillars, all of them placed on a paneled stylobate with Renaissance decoration. On the architrave runs a frieze decorated with flowers, stars, foliage, and above this the cornice adorned with acanthus leaves, which follows the projections of the facade stretching out in a semicircular arch to protect a niche formed on an interrupted pediment that, supported by four cherubs, crowns the main door and accommodates an image of the Immaculate Conception surrounded by angels and cherubs. At the top of the niche, another smaller pediment contains the Holy Spirit in his dove symbol.

The second body, located in the upper part of the previous one, is made up of a huge central window adorned with a broken pediment to receive a large cartouche of shells and fronds with a legend dedicated to Saint Ignatius, patron saint of the Jesuit order: "DIVO PARENTI IGNATIO SACRUM". The pediment is lowered on modillions of acanthus leaves, and between them an ornamental card of Plateresque taste concludes the composition of the window. This is flanked by very rich pilasters whose capital has a single row of acanthus leaves (the upper one), decorated and composed in the way that French goldsmiths and cabinetmakers of the 18th century composed and decorated furniture and precious objects; that is, with horizontal grooves and large mirrors decorated in its center. Over them runs an entablature reminiscent of the first body, and ends the whole in a semicircular tympanum intercut to fit a large modillion in the center, on which the bright bronze Jesuit cross stands out, on the characteristic groyne of the cresting. The entire portal defends a roof lined with half-mogote azulejos.

The frontispiece frames, between its pilasters and columns, the niches in which the full-length statues of Saint Ignatius of Loyola, Saint Francisco Xavier, Saint Estanislao of Kostka and Saint Luis de Gonzaga are exhibited. On the flank walls, next to the window, are those of Saint Francis Borgia and Saint John Francis Regis. You can also see the busts of the apostles Peter and Paul next to the main door; and on the lintel of the side doors, the Hearts of Jesus and Mary, which attest to the antiquity of the faith and worship of the Quitoan people to the Sacred Hearts.

=== Street cross ===
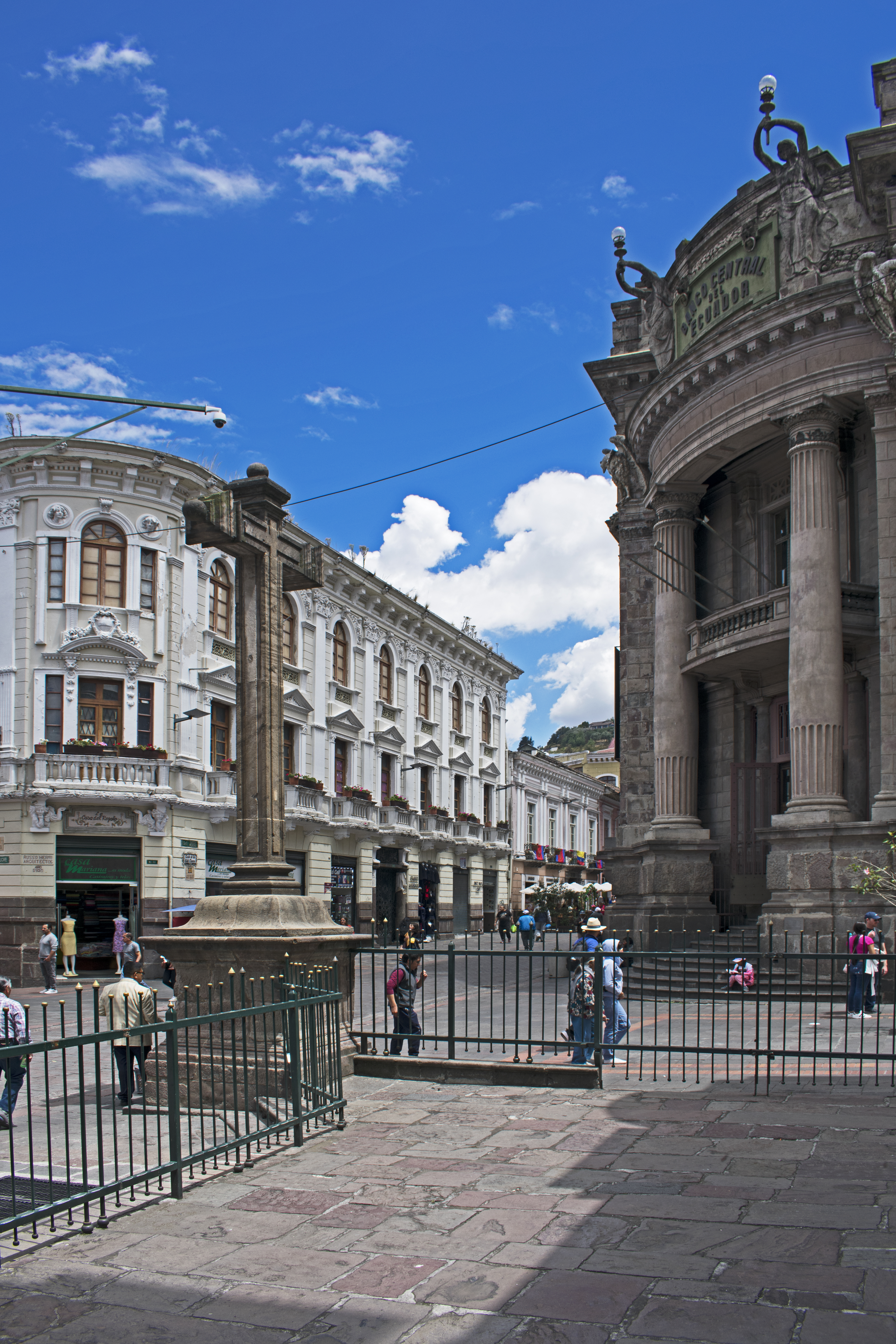
The street cross

The stone cross that can be seen on the exterior south side, on the factory line of the sidewalk, was previously attached to the church by a beautiful parapet that closed the atrium. Its base, with its wonderful moldings and magnificent proportions, make it a true architectural monument, worthy of contemplation and study. With good reason, when speaking of the church of the Society of Jesus in Quito, the illustrious Italian artist, Giulio Aristide Sartorio, says: "Complete buildings, such as la Compañía de Jesús in Quito, are still rare in the Old Continent".

=== Defunct bell tower ===
The bell tower, which fell to the ground after the earthquake of 1859, must have fully corresponded to the greatness of the church, with its height of 180 arms that made it the tallest in the city. This was recomposed years later, giving it back its very particular medieval style; moreover, another earthquake in 1868 cracked it so much that there was no choice but to undo it to the height of the barbican. The bells that one day rang in the tower are today in a room attached to the church, open to the public for that you can admire them. It is a set of six bells of various sizes and weights, the largest weighing 4,400 lbs; while the smallest and oldest is 140 lbs.

== Interiors ==
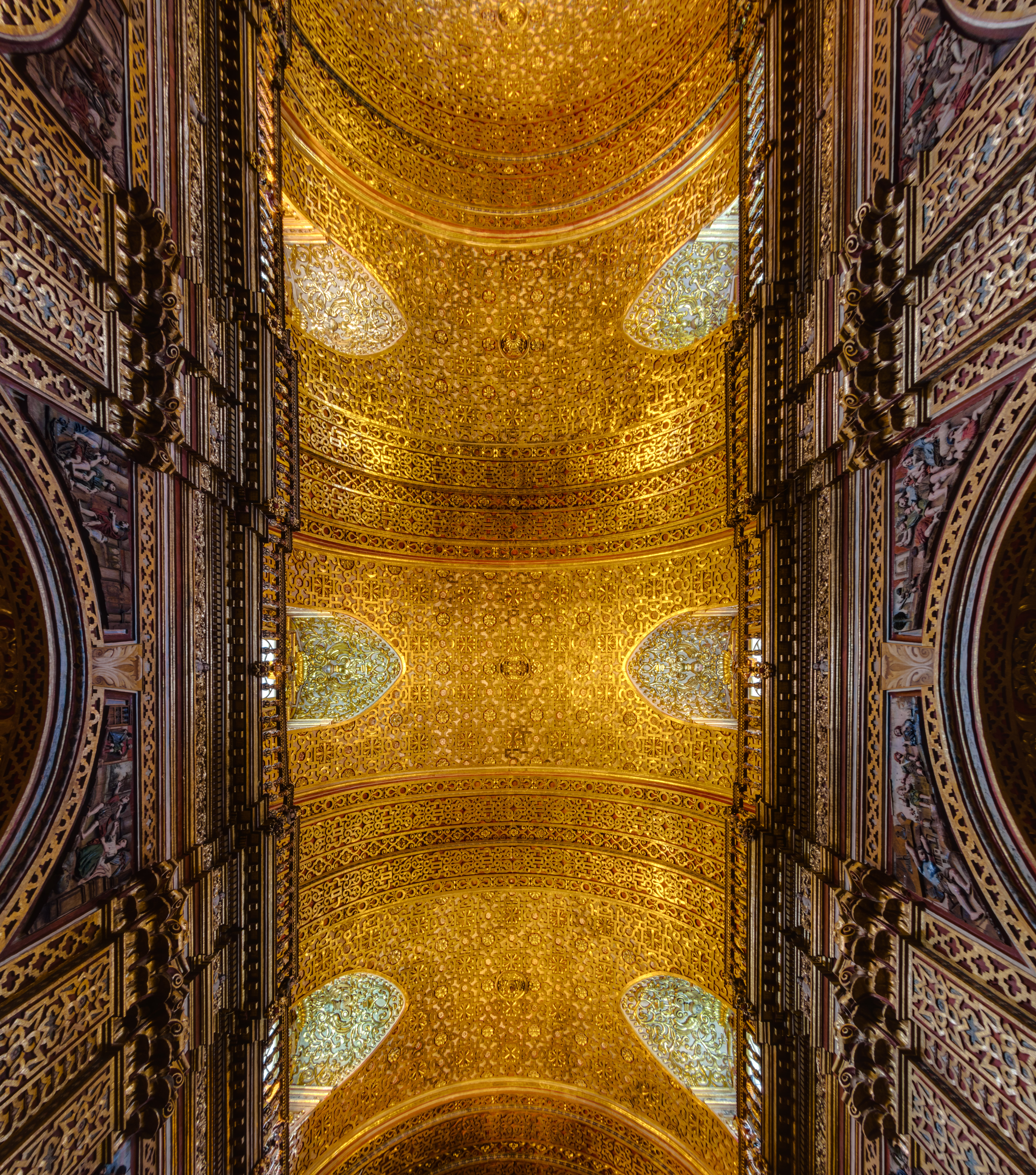
Ceiling view

The greatest characteristic of the internal decoration of La Compañía de Quito is its very Baroque forms in carved cedar wood, polychrome and bathed in 23-carat gold leaf on a red background. The main altarpiece, in the apse, and the richly decorated pulpit stand out above all.

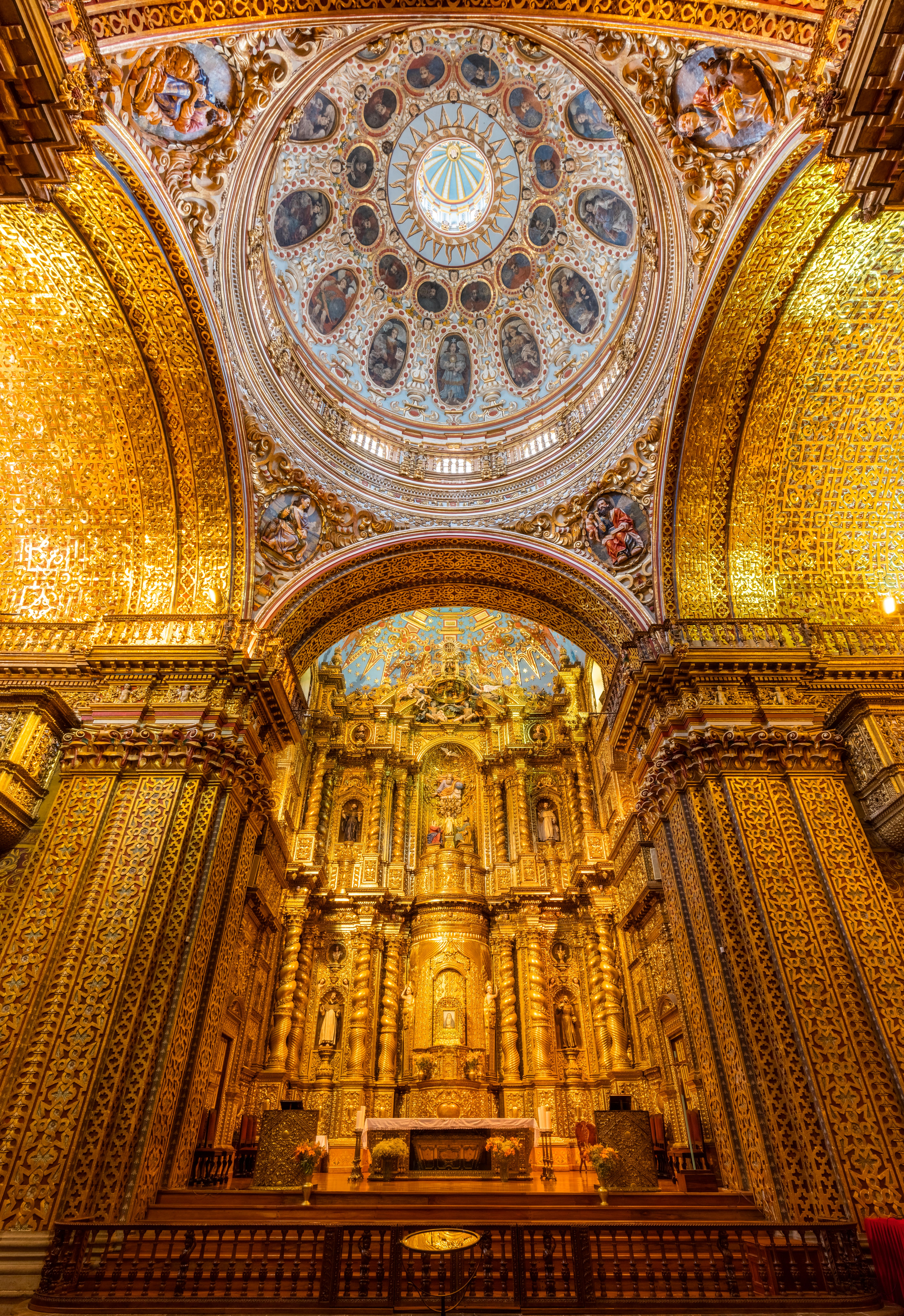
Main altarpiece and dome

The primitive altarpiece was a simile of the main façade, typical of the Baroque style construction system; and the one that is currently appreciated maintains most of those features. When it began to rise, they wanted to make it of stone and brick, only in 1735 did they change the design to wood, with the guidelines of the Jesuit brother Jorge Vinterer, of German origin and whose carving took ten years (1735-1745). In January In 1745, the famous artist Bernardo de Legarda, signed a contract with the Father Rector of the Jesuit Order by means of which he undertook to "Undertake the work of gilding in the tabernacle of the main altar of the Church of la Compañía". Legarda was in charge of placing the sheets of gold leaf, and his intervention lasted another 10 years, that is to say that the total work of the altarpiece finally took twenty years (1735-1755).

On top of the cornice stands the second body, very similar to the one described above; its Solomonic columns are not fluted in their lower third like the previous ones, and the circular niches above the large niches have been eliminated, which are reproduced in that body exactly as we find them in the lower body of the altarpiece. In place of those niches shelves have been placed, in the manner of the spillage of a pediment, on which two rampant figures extend, standing out against the background of a window. The tabernacle of the first body is replaced in this with a large niche whose vault passes to the third, where it is flanked by four small oval niches. Above this last body is the final cornice that serves as an impost for the interrupted double pediment, within which a group of angels holds a huge crown in their hands. The shaft of the Solomonic columns of the second body of the altarpiece has six spirals, which indicates a strict observance of the precepts, then brand new, of Viñola; on the other hand, that of the first body has seven, if the striated ones are to be counted.9

The niches contain figures of the founding saints of religious communities such as Saint Francis of Assisi, Saint Dominic de Guzmán, Saint Augustine, Saint Aloysius Gonzaga, Saint Mariana de Jesús de Paredes and Saint Ignatius of Loyola. In the upper part it is adorned by a symbolic crown of the Catholic Church, with the sculptural composition of the Holy Spirit, God the Father, God the Son, as well as the figures of the Virgin Mary, Saint Joseph and the Holy Trinity. Everything forms a single sculptural ensemble where the divine and the earthly come together, attributed to Severo Carrión (except for the Child Jesus, carved by José Yépez).

=== Pulpit ===
Another interesting piece within La Compañía de Quito is the pulpit, located on the north side of the archery line of the temple. Beautifully carved, it contains 250 small cherubim faces and figures of the evangelists Matthew, Luke, Mark and John, as well as the Jesuit saints Saint Ignatius of Loyola and Francis Xavier. A special element is the Christ the Redeemer child of European origin.

=== Presbytery ===
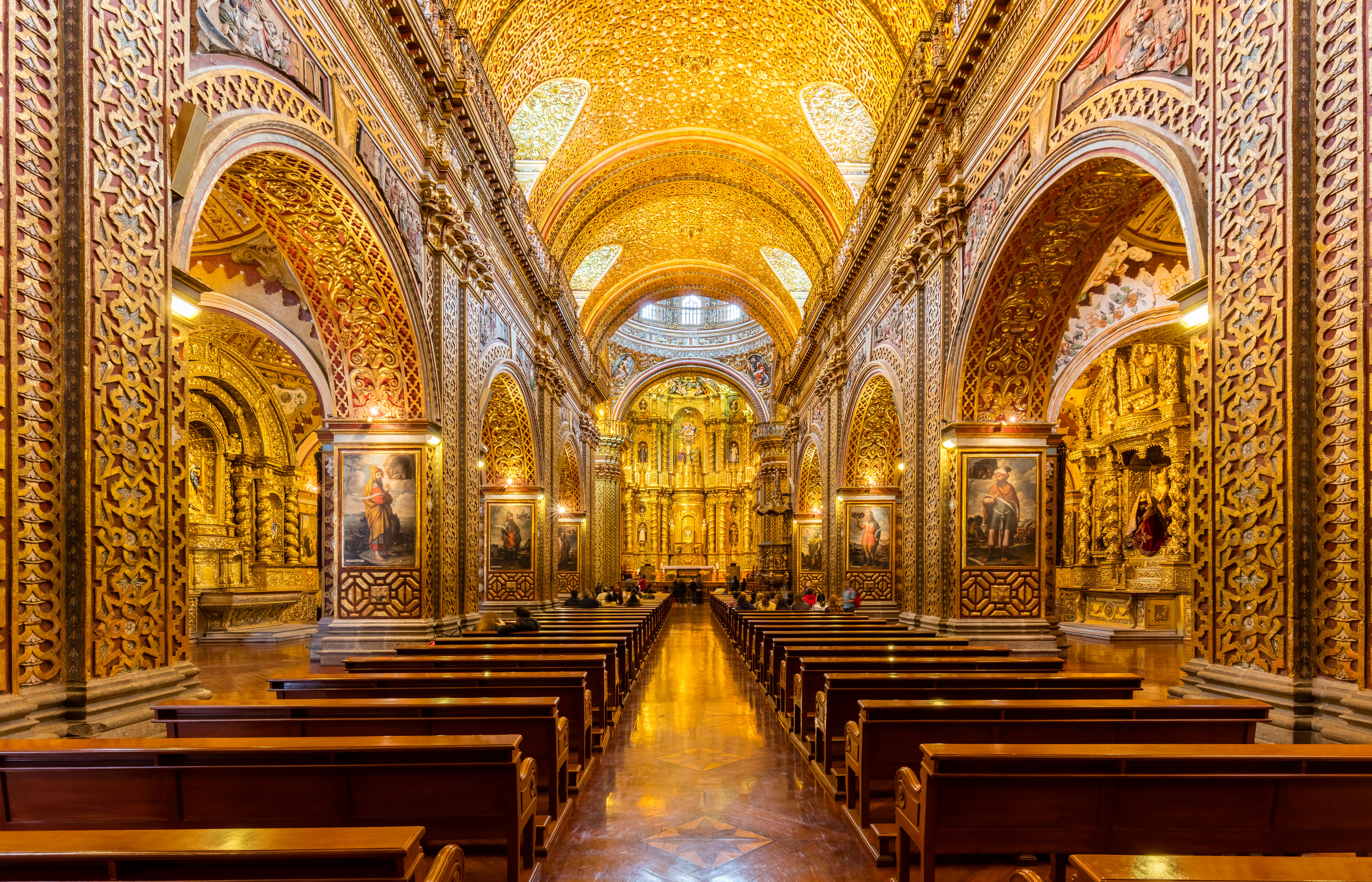
Main nave

The side walls of the presbytery are lined with wooden cladding, with two openwork galleries on half pilasters that flank the exit doors; all this full of profuse stylized floral decoration. Above the galleries there is a semicircular arch opening, within which various architectural elements can be seen, forming a portico with an interrupted pediment, above which there is a porthole that illuminates the presbytery. Between this set and the altarpiece there are, along the wall, fourteen oil paintings with the busts of Jesus, Mary and the twelve apostles, forming an integral part of the decoration of the coating. The dome that covers the presbytery is decorated with stucco. All the decoration of the presbytery has complete unity in its variety of forms, having used as the main motif the serpentine and acanthus foliage, which was treated with such preference and extreme delicacy in the Renaissance period.

=== Side naves ===
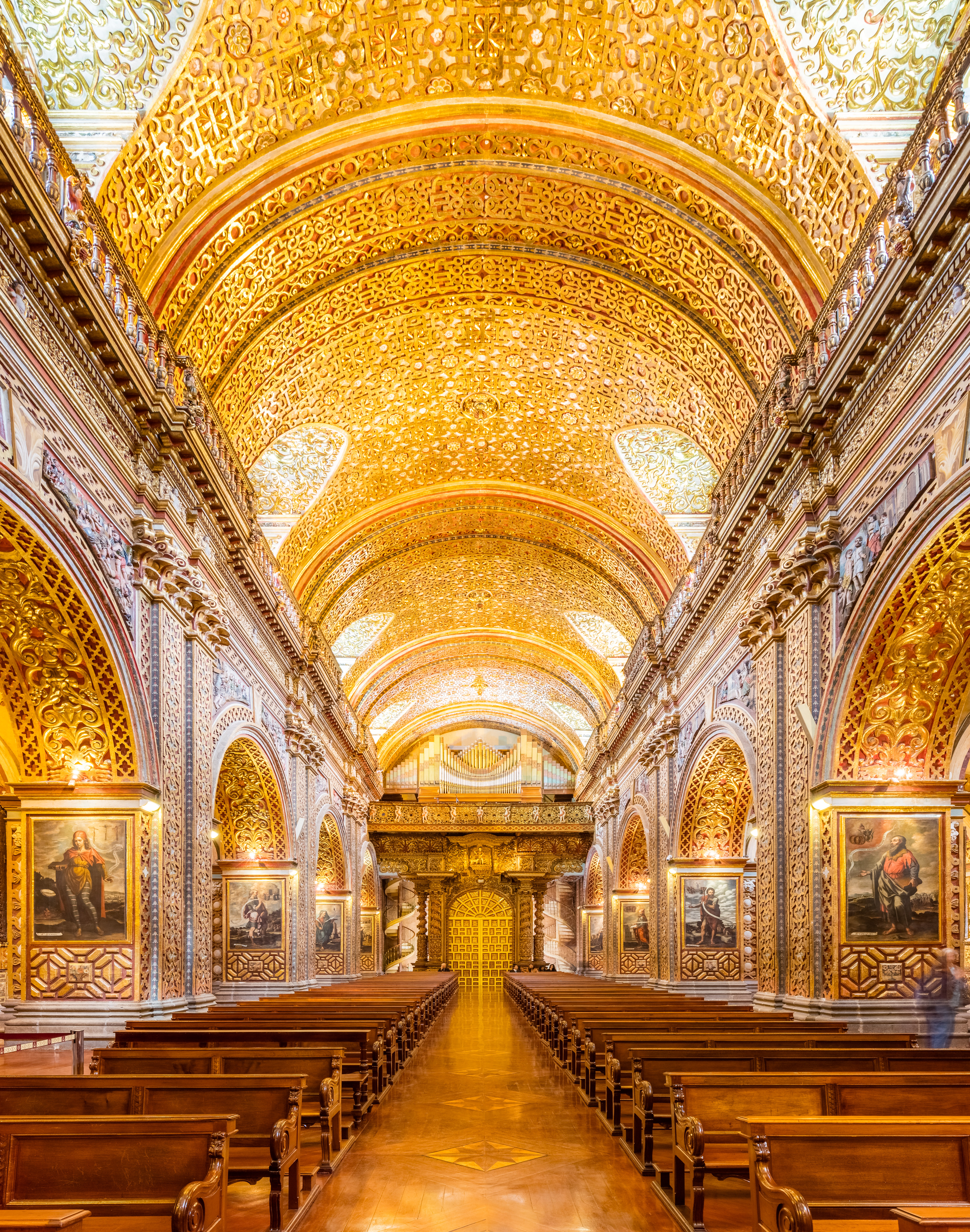
View from the main altar, with the interior main gate in the background

The side naves are made up of eight vaulted, square chapels with lowered domes on pendentives and interconnected by large arches. The last two chapels have two immense paintings called The Hell and The final judgement, painted by brother Hernando de la Cruz in the year 1620. The others have altarpieces, all in Churrigueresque style and similar in their architectural organization of two bodies, one lower on a large stylobate and composed of a central niche, flanked on each side by a Solomonic column; and an upper one with a central niche, also flanked by two twisted columns and two lateral niches or any decorative panel. There is no space in these altarpieces, no matter how small, that is not covered with ornamental work; the very interior of the niches is an emporium of foliage; the entablatures, a set of moldings enhanced with pearl fillets, eggs, flowers, darts, gallons, garlands and a thousand filigrees; Solomonic columns, a pure lattice of grape shoots and, some of them, bird handles. The presentation of all that decorative apparatus, exaggerated and all, is of such a filigree that it only softens the roughness of the architectural forms, without destroying or absorbing them.

=== Interior main gate ===
The interior main gate of the church is a work of the 18th century and has very ornate carvings. It has pilasters, to which six Solomonic columns are attached, resting on a base with modillions. In the middle of its upper decoration, which reaches 12 meters in height, it has a niche that houses the representation of Saint John the Baptist child on a shelf. During colonial times, this mampara fulfilled two main functions: the first was to prevent sound from entering or leaving, so that it would not disturb the parishioners during mass; and the second was to stop the entry of indigenous people who were not baptized.

=== Choir ===
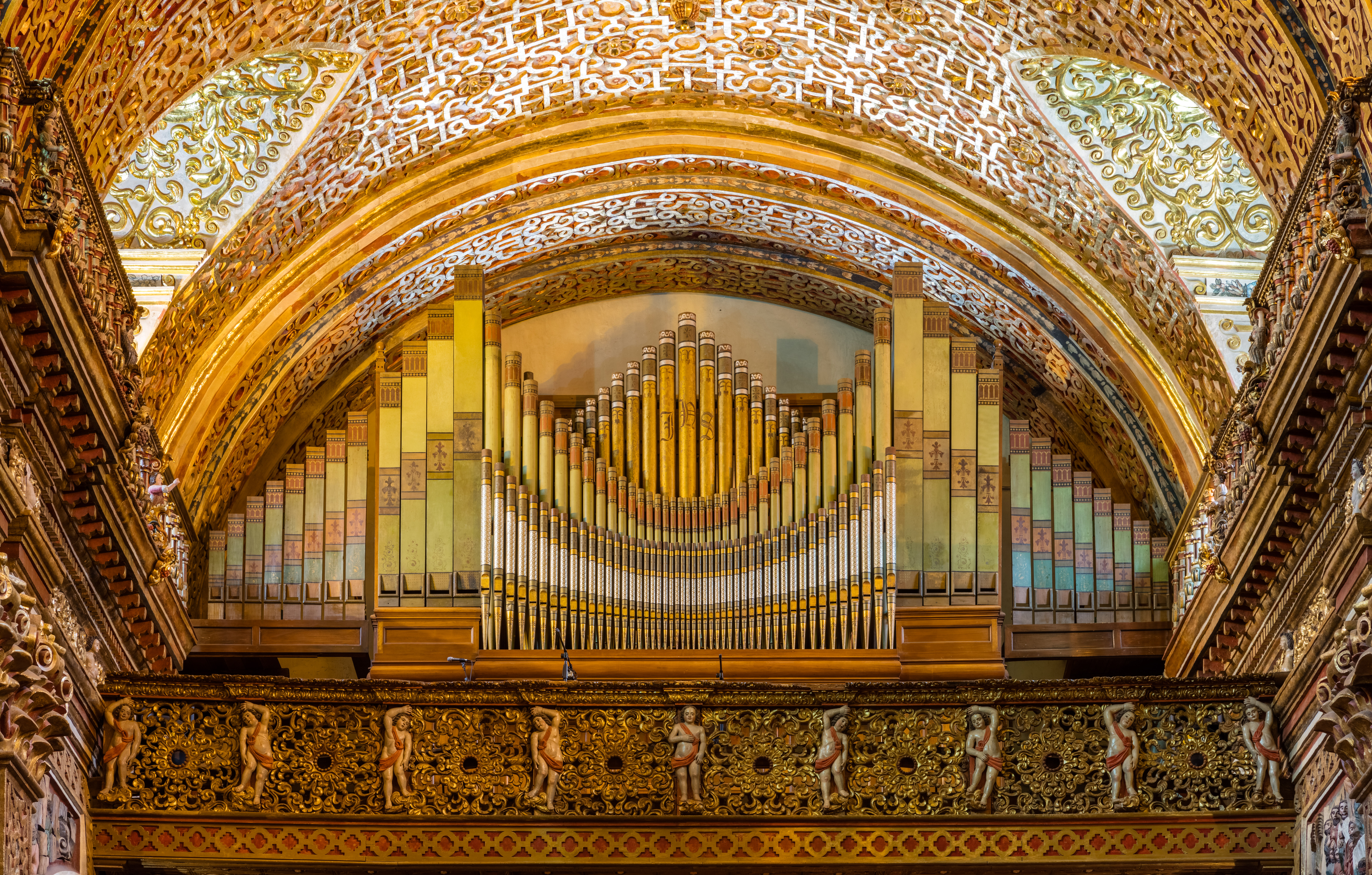
Detail of the organ, in the choir

Located on the mampara is the choir of the church, supported by the pilasters of the former. The parapet is a grid of large serpentine rosettes separated from each other by polychrome statuettes representing naked children, limited in its lower part by an arabesque meander and in the upper part, by a double cornice. In this place there is an organ (the second largest in Quito that still works) manufactured in the United States in 1889. It has 1,104 tubes that work as a manual bellows that allows the sound to rise. This instrument is only used on special festivities.

On the ceiling, under the floor of the choir and between the mampara and the door to the street, which form a sort of entrance hall, we find a shield with the emblem of the Jesuits, discreetly ornamented that can only be seen by those who look up when entering the temple through the main gate on the first floor.

== Paintings ==
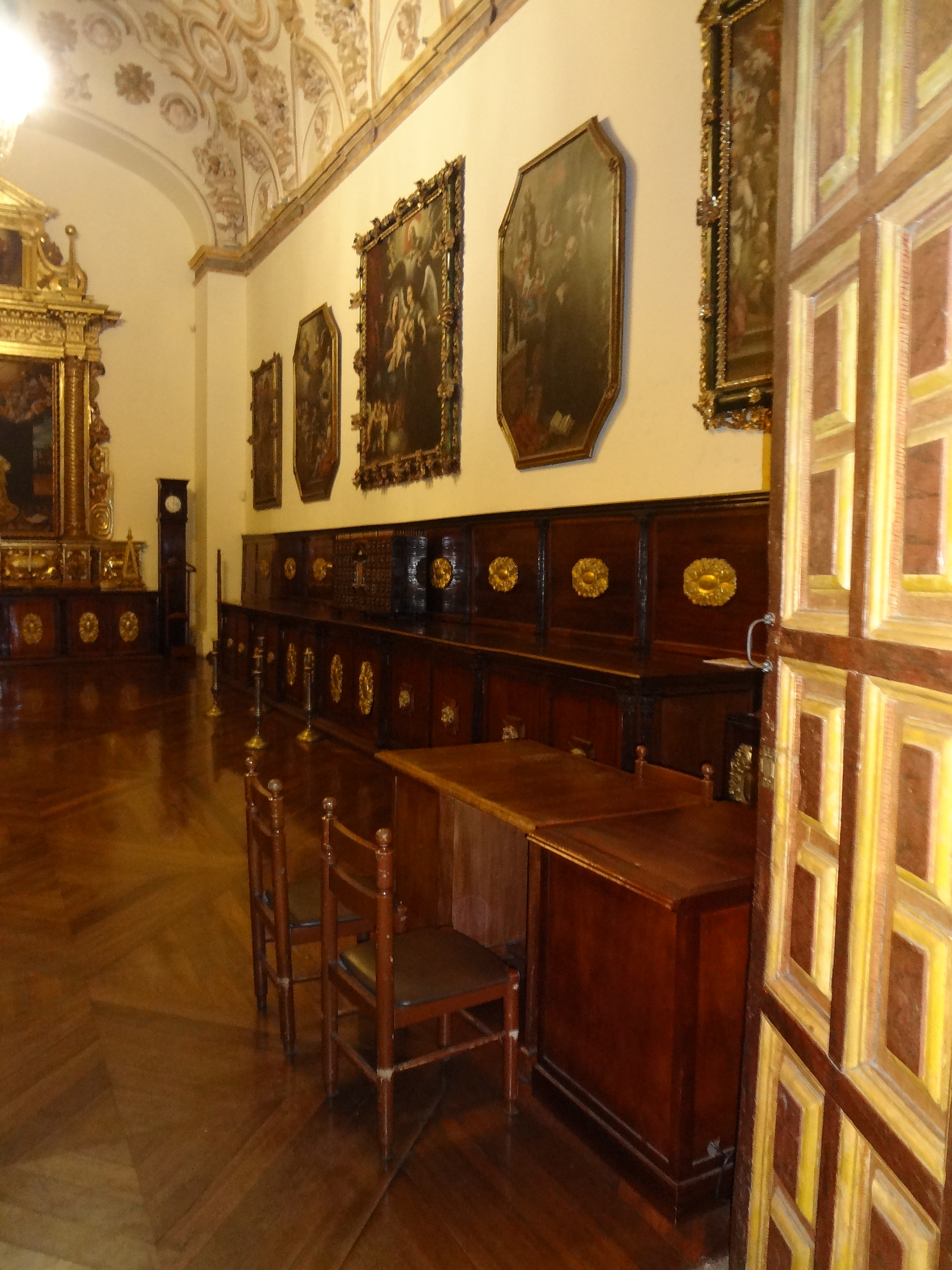
Paintings

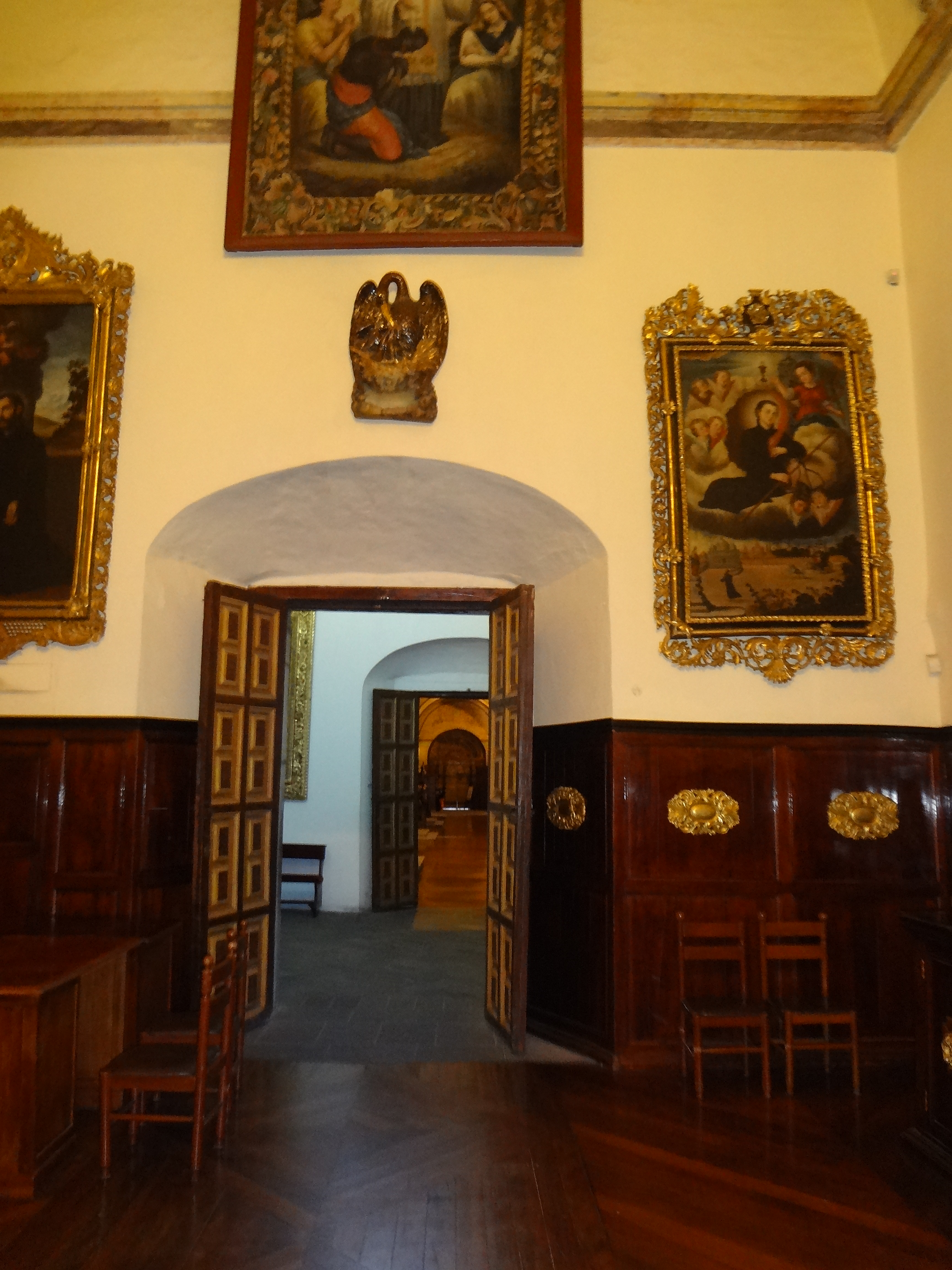
Quito School Paintings

La Compañía Church is a true colonial Art gallery; exhibits only on the walls of the church (not counting the monastery) a number of 21 small, 15 medium, 74 large and 2 enormous oil paintings. The pillars, the walls between altarpieces, the walls of the presbytery, the sacristy, everything is dressed in oil paintings and many of them have precious golden Baroque frames. We also find the mural painting that adorns the arches and vaults of the lateral naves; Between the mural painting there are ovals with images in relief or appliqués of saints. All works by the most famous artists of the Quito School, one of the most exquisite of the colonial era in the Americas. That is why there are several sets that deserve to be named.

=== The Four Evangelists ===
The central dome, which is magnificent in its proportions and ornamentation, is ten meters in diameter. It starts from a drum that rests on four pendentives adorned with scrolls that surround large elliptical medallions with braided molding, within which the polychrome image of the four evangelists has been represented in wood and half relief: Matthew, Mark, Luke, John.

A frieze of serpentine grapes and another divided into panels limited by a small braid and composed of a figurehead between two eagles with open wings, link the pendentives and the arches with a wooden balustrade propped on a cornice that runs above the drum, in which twelve large windows give light to the dome and allow you to admire its decoration.

=== The Cardinals of the Society of Jesus ===
The start of the central dome is decorated with the painted figures of twelve huge angels, and on this first decorative circle runs another composed with the portraits of the Cardinals of the Society of Jesus prior to the construction of the church, and three of their first Archbishops. These are, in chronological order, the parents:

- Toledo
- Bellarmine
- Lugo
- Palavicini
- Pazmany
- nithard
- Hundred fires
- Casimir (King of Poland)
- Andrés Oviedo (Patriarch of Ethiopia)
- Melchor Carneyro (Coadjutor of the previous one)
- Father Roz (Archbishop of Tragancor).

Both the figures of the angels and the portraits of the Jesuits are framed in stucco moldings, elliptical for the former, and round for the latter. Each Jesuit portrait rests on a cherub's head, and above the circle that forms the whole, runs another, also with winged heads that limit the stucco decoration of the vault. The interstices left by these details have been filled with other ornamental motifs.

=== The Sixteen Prophets ===
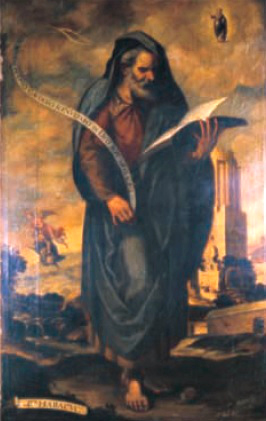
Prophet Haboc, part of the work The Prophets by Nicolás Javier de Goríbar (17th century)

The pilasters of the arcade bear, as an integral part of their decoration and attached to the wall, one of the richest jewels of Quitoan painting, The Sixteen Prophets, work of the great master Nicolás de Goríbar, an artist who flourished in the second half of the 17th century. Today we know that the Prophets of Goríbar are inspired by the plates of the Prophets, from the Bible of Venice (1701) by Nicolás Pezzana. The large paintings represent the 16 biblical prophets; they have their own psychological features, appropriate clothing of great perfection, with landscapes in the lower part, while in the upper corners scenes alluding to the prophecy of each one about the announced Messiah are represented.

The prophets that Goríbar painted are the following:

- Aggeo
- Habakkuk
- Jeremiah
- Daniel
- Joel
- Malachi
- Micah
- Obadiah
- Amos
- Zacharias
- Ezequiel
- Isaiah
- Jonah
- Hosea
- Nahymm
- Zephaniah

Father J. M. Vargas reinforces this opinion with authoritative words: "Goríbar knew the human soul very well and knew how to represent it in the various manifestations that determine age and social status. The drawing and modeling of each character show an understanding of their religious and historical value, interpreted with a sober plastic structure. The coloring is remarkably transparent, even in those dark, serious tones that are difficult to execute. Almost all the prophets dialogue with the spectator and indicate with their finger the reason for their prophecy...".

=== Other works ===
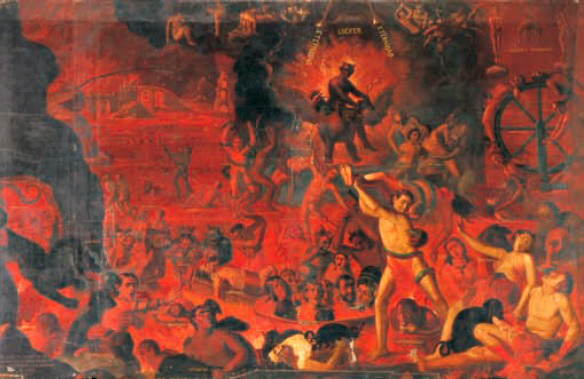
Hell by Father Hernando de la Cruz (17th century)

In addition to these pictorial groups mentioned above, there are others among anonymous, attributed and signed:

From Father Hernando de la Cruz:

- Saint Ignatius of Loyola, in the altarpiece of the Sacristy.
- The Last Judgment, in the final chapel of the south nave.
- Hell, in the final chapel of the north aisle.

From Joaquín Pinto:

- Santa Mariana Catechist, in the Chapel of Santa Mariana de Jesús.
- At least six canvases on the life of the Quitoan saint, attributed to him, in the same chapel.

From Jean de Morainville:

- Saint Francis Xavier, in the Sacristy.
- Saint Francis Borgia, in the Sacristy.
- Saint Alonso Rodríguez, in the Sacristy.

Anonymous:

- Samson and Delilah, on the arches.
- Joseph, son of Jacob, on the bows.
- Other anonymous from the 18th century.

== Sculptures ==
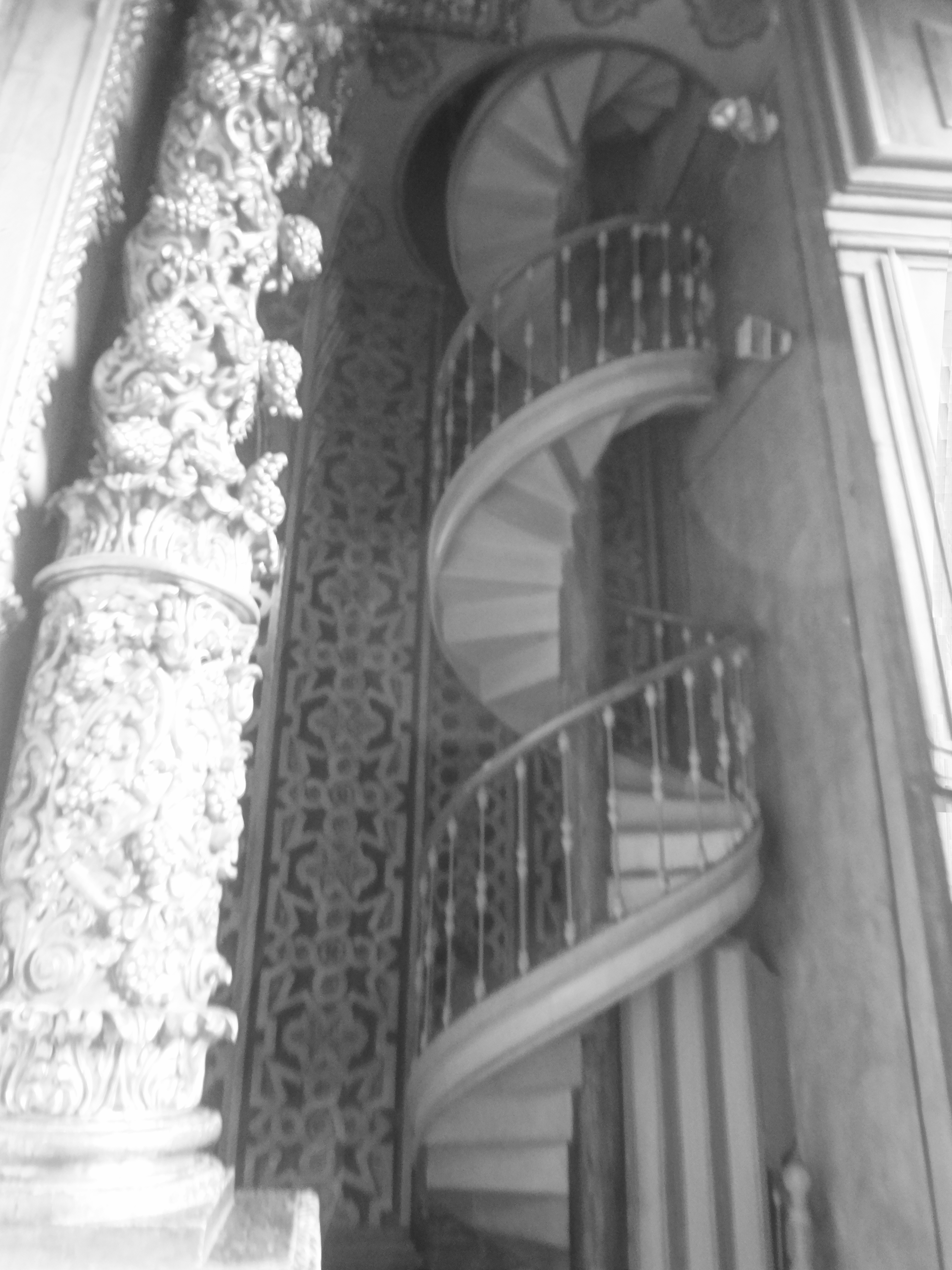
Detail of a pillar

The carving of garlands, leaves, flowers, fruits, frets and inlays sprouts everywhere. We find a whole army of angels, cherubs, archangels and seraphim that flutter happily in the sky of La Compañía of Quito, through altarpieces, cornices and friezes. As for the imagery of the saints, most of these sculptures are anonymous, with the exception of the following:

From Padre Carlos:

- Saint Ignatius, in his respective altar.
- Saint Francis Xavier, in his respective altar.
- Mary Magdalene, at their respective altar.
- Saint John, in his respective altar.
- Calvary, in the main altarpiece.
- Crucified Christ, in the main altarpiece.
- Mary, the mother, in the Sacristy.

From Severo Carrion:

- Virgin Mary, in the main altarpiece.
- Saint Joseph, in the main altarpiece
- Holy Trinity, in the main altarpiece.

From Jose Yepez:

- The child Jesus, in the main altarpiece.

From Floatches of Barcelona

- Saint Mariana de Jesús, in the Chapel of la Santa.

From Leonardo Deubler:

All the andesite stone sculptures found on the exterior door of the temple.

== Sacred treasures ==
Despite the fact that with the expulsion of the Jesuits in 1767, ordered by King Charles III of Spain due to the political conspiracies of the religious against the Enlightened Monarchy, many of the treasures of the order were auctioned or taken to Spain, where today they are important pieces in museums and even in several of the Royal Palaces of Madrid, there are two that have remained immovable over time: the remains of Santa Mariana de Jesús and the Painting of the Miracle of the Virgin of Sorrows.

=== Remains of Santa Mariana de Jesus ===
A faithful visitor to La Compañía throughout her life, Mariana de Jesús Paredes y Flores was even a member of the Confraternity of esclavas de Nuestra Señora de Loreto, which had its headquarters in this church. After dying at the age of 26, offering her life to God for the people of Quito, she is buried at the foot of the altar of this Virgin as she always wished.

When she was beatified in 1850, a Chapel was built on the south side of the Presbytery, where her remains were placed in a rich bronze chest carved in Paris by order of President Gabriel García Moreno. In 1912, Archbishop Federico González Suárez paid for a beautiful gilt-silver Gothic chest as a reliquary for Mariana's ashes. A neoclassical altarpiece was carved in the Chapel, which is dominated by the statue of Mariana de Jesús, the work of the sculptor Flotachs from Barcelona. The chapel is decorated with several canvases attributed to Joaquín Pinto on the life of the then Blessed. In 1950, Pope Pius XII proclaimed the sanctity of Mariana de Jesus; then the ark with its remains are deposited under the main altar, where they are now preserved; and the consecration of the church of La Compañía to the name of the first Ecuadorian saint is made. It is, then, The Compañía of Quito, the National Sanctuary of Mariana de Jesús, declared in 1946, by the National Constituent Assembly, as a National Heroine.

=== Painting of the Miracle of Our Lady of Sorrows ===
Since the beginning of the 20th century, another unexpected treasure has enriched the temple of La Compañía de Quito, and the then adjacent Colegio San Gabriel: the prodigy of the Painting of the Sorrows, which presided over the dining room for the boarding school. On the night of April 20, 1906, 35 children were having dinner in the dining room before retiring to their rooms, when, astonished, several of them noticed that supposedly the image of the painting of Our Lady of Sorrows (52 cm long and 40 cm wide) hung on the wall, opened and closed his eyes repeatedly. They believed that it was an optical illusion, a fantasy; and then they call other guys, who see the same thing. Restless, they notify the Father and the Brother who were watching the dinner; they approach incredulously, but they observe the same prodigy, which lasts for about fifteen minutes with the image of the painting opening and closing its eyes, before the children and the clerics.

The print was a sheet of cardboard, lithographed in Paris (Turgis Fils. 55 rue de St.Placide), which a dealer in religious articles had brought to Quito, and was offering them. Word of the alleged miracle spread through the city, people were moved; but the ecclesiastical authority, which was, due to the vacant seat, the Capitular Vicar, Monsignor Ulpiano Pérez Quiñónez, orders the removal of the painting and not give any publicity to the case, until the necessary inquiries are made first. The thing was examined by ecclesiastics, religious and professional experts, excluding the Jesuits; the statement was heard, one by one, separately, from all the schoolboys, the Father and the Brother, and the employees who saw the miracle: all the testimonies were unanimous, concordant, simple or naive, like children between 10 and 17 years old . After the serious examination, the ecclesiastical authority issued a decree with three points:

- The fact is verified as true.
- It is not explained by natural or malignant causes.
- The Church allows that image of the Virgen de los Dolores to be venerated, which from now on will be called, "La Dolorosa del Colegio".

Then a chapel was built for the painting in the Colegio San Gabriel; and when the new headquarters of the College was built to the north of Quito in the 1970s, a splendid church with modern lines was placed next to it, which would be the headquarters of the Parish of la Dolorosa. What was the dining room for the schoolboys and the place of the miracle has become a sanctuary, a chapel enriched with fine wood carvings where a facsimile of the Miraculous Painting marks the exact place of the events and attracts the visits of devotees.

== See also ==
- List of buildings in Quito
- 18th-century Western domes

== Gallery ==
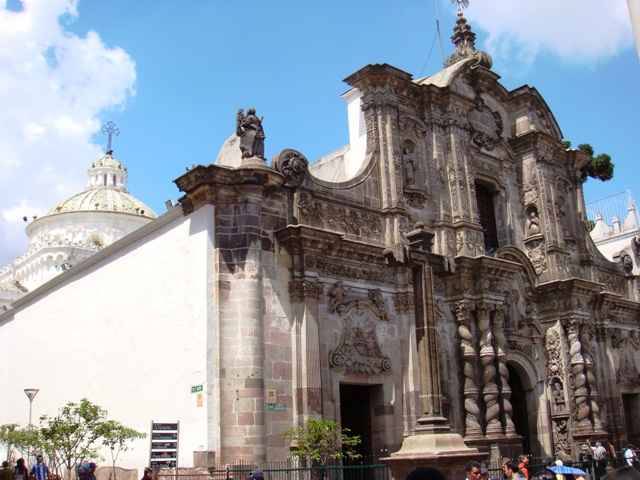
View of La Compañía from the southeast

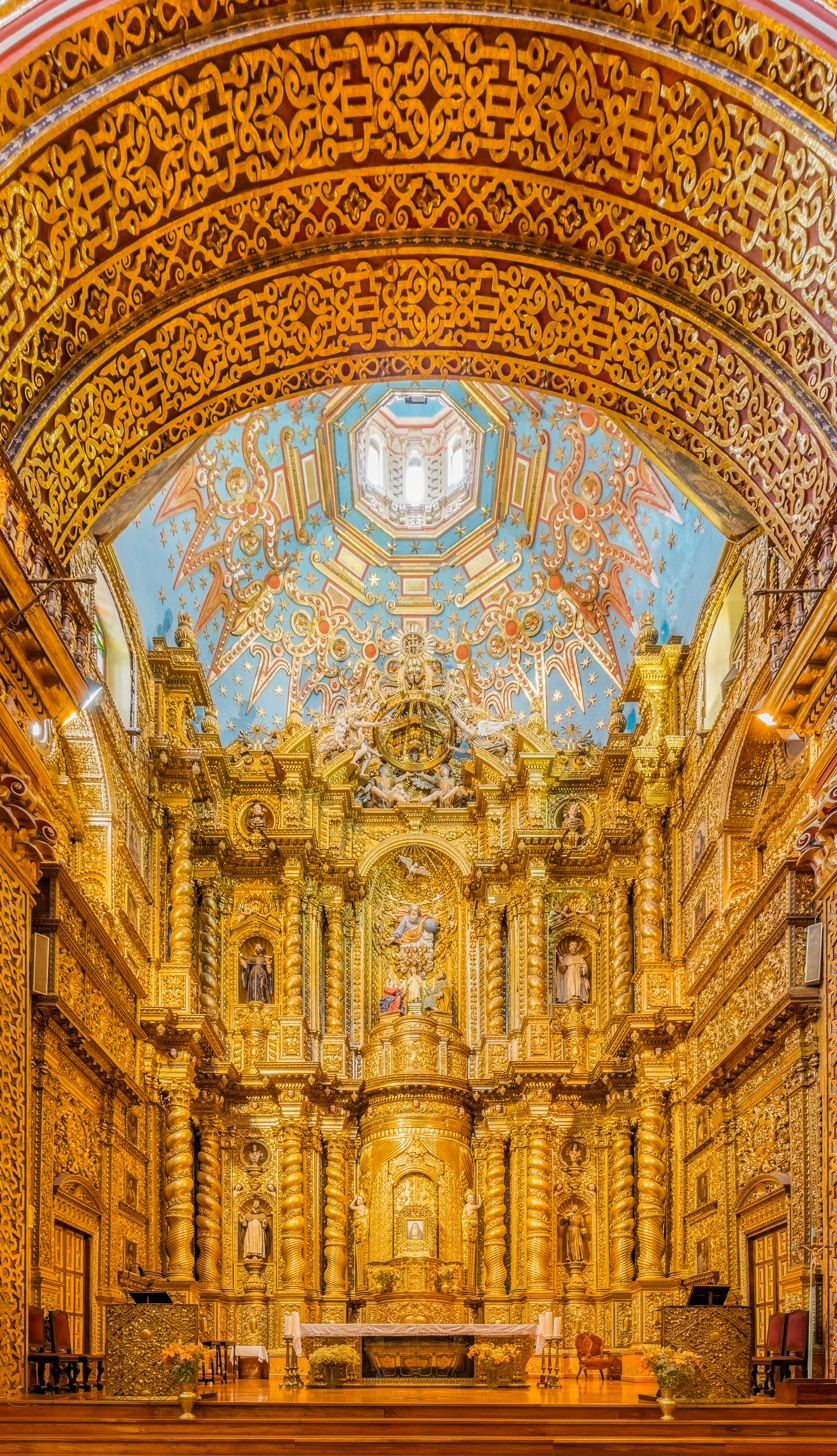
The high altar

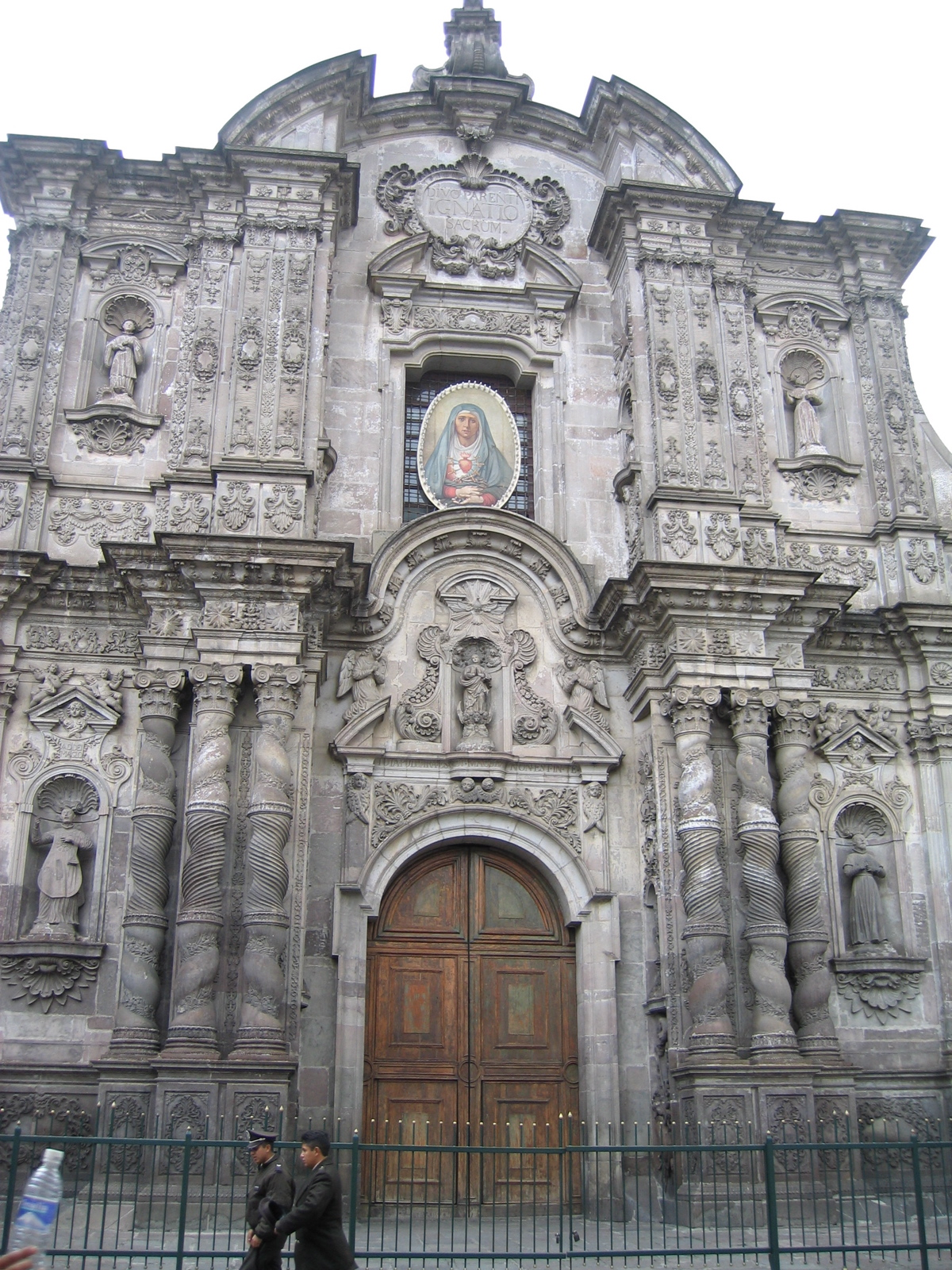
Facade of the church

== Bibliography ==
- Greenspan, E (2007). Ecuador & the Galapagos Islands. Chichester: John Wiley. ISBN 9780470120026.
- Kennedy, A (2002). Arte de la Real Audiencia de Quito, siglos XVII-XIX. Hondarribia: Nerea. ISBN 8489569835.
- Vargas, JMF (2005). Patrimonio Artístico Ecuatoriano: La Compañía de Jesús. Quito: Trama. ISBN 9978300171.
- Báez, C (2008). Rostros e Imágenes de La Compañía de Jesús, Quito en el Contexto Barroco. PH Ediciones y B&B Grupo COMUNICACIÓN. ISBN 9789942021243.
