= Nobol Canton =

- Canton
- Flag

- Location in Guayas Province.

- Location of Guayas in Ecuador.
- Coordinates: 1.916671°S 80.011539°W
- Country: Ecuador
- Province: Guayas Province
- Capital: Nobol

Government
  - Mayor: Mariana Jacome Álvarez

Area
  - Total: 134.8 km^{2} (52.0 sq mi)

Population (2022 census)
  - Total: 23,850
  - Density: 176.9/km^{2} (458.2/sq mi)
- Time zone: UTC-5 (ECT)

Nobol Canton is a canton of Ecuador, located in the Guayas Province. Its capital is the town of Nobol. Its population at the 2001 census was 14,753.

== Demographics ==
Ethnic groups as of the Ecuadorian census of 2010:

- Mestizo 50.4%
- Montubio 38.0%
- Afro-Ecuadorian 6.4%
- White 4.8%
- Indigenous 0.2%
- Other 0.2%
