= Mercedes de Jesús Molina =

Blessed Mercedes de Jesús Molina
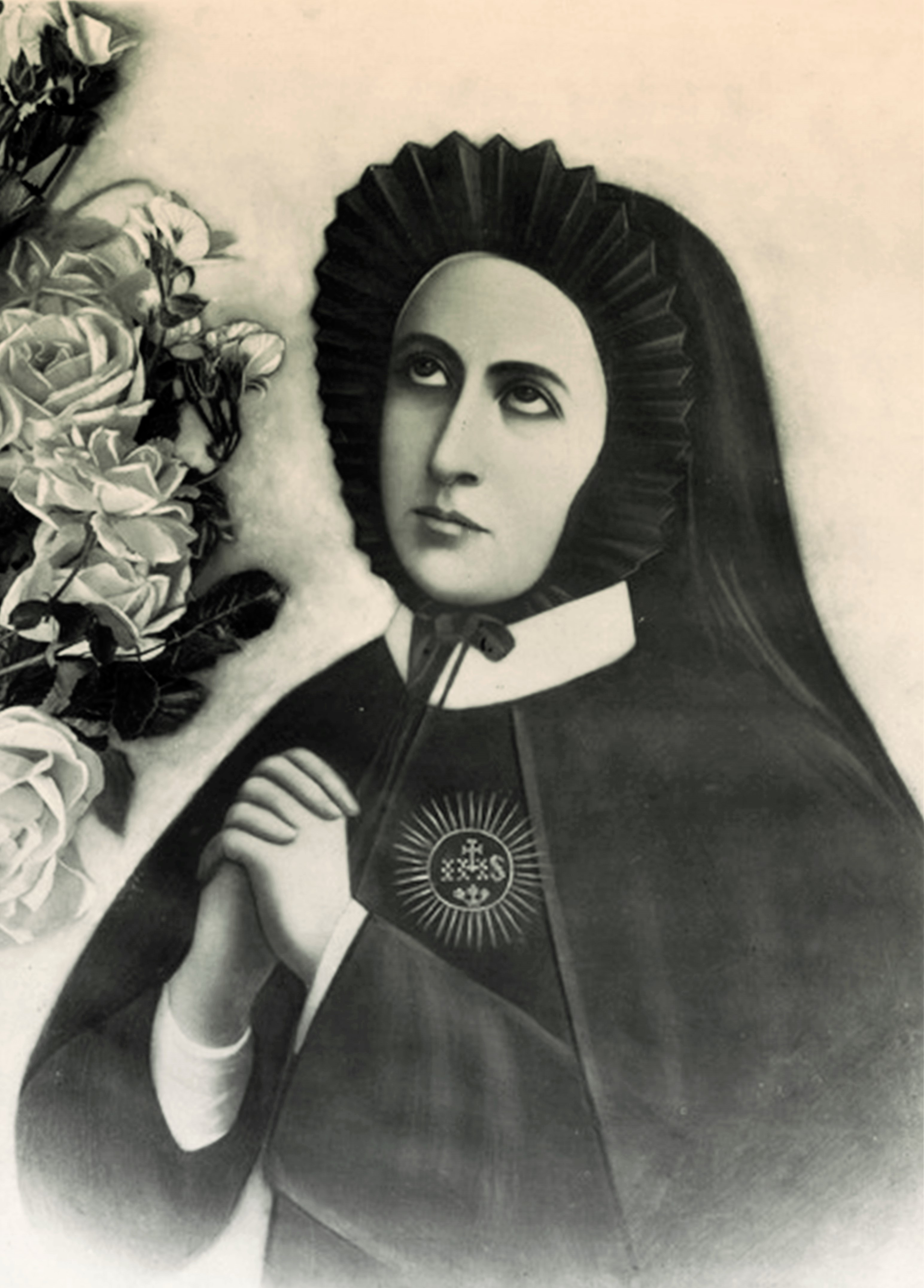

Rose of Baba and Guayaquil
- Born: 24 September 1828; Baba, Los Ríos, Ecuador
- Died: 12 June 1883 (aged 54); Riobamba, Chimborazo, Ecuador
- Venerated in: Roman Catholic Church
- Beatified: 1 February 1985, Guayaquil, Ecuador by Pope John Paul II
- Feast: June 12

Mercedes de Jesús Molina (Maria Mercedes de Jesus Molina y Ayala; 24 September 1828 – 12 June 1883) is a Roman Catholic blessed from Baba, Ecuador. She was a missionary who devoted her life to the care of abandoned children and founded the order of the Sisters of Mariana de Jesús. She was beatified by Pope John Paul II on 1 February 1985.

== Biography ==
Mercedes de Jesús Molina was born on 24 September 1828 in Baba, Los Ríos Province, Ecuador. She was the daughter of Miguel Molina y Arbeláez and Rosa Ayala y Aguilar. After the death of her father, two years later, Mercedes and her mother moved to Guayaquil.Then at the age of thirteen Mercedes suffered the death of her mother. A bad fall from a horse brought about her conversion to absolute piety and strict penance. From then on she devoted her life to care of abandoned children. She did this first as mother and teacher to orphans in Guayaquil then in Cuenca, where she shared a home with Narcisa de Jesús.

Mercedes later volunteered her services to the Jesuits to assist in the conversion of the Jivaroan peoples. After the missionaries had to give up their mission territory, Mercedes settled in Riobamba. There she took vows of poverty, chasity and obedience and founded the Sisters of Mariana de Jesús, named after Mariana de Jesús, on 14 April 1873. This institute provided care to orphans, converts, and women who had been released from prison. She died ten years later in Riobamba on 12 June 1883.

== Veneration ==
Mercedes's cause was formally opened on 8 February 1946, granting her the title of Servant of God. She was beatified on 1 February 1985 by Pope John Paul II in Guayaquil.

It is a joy for all Christian people of Ecuador, that for now on they can venerate, together with the "Lily of Quito", St. Mariana de Jesus, the "Rose of Baba and Guayaquil", Blessed Mercedes de Jesus

— Pope John Paul II, at her beatification ceremony
