= Nobol =

Nobol Narcisa de Jesús
- Town
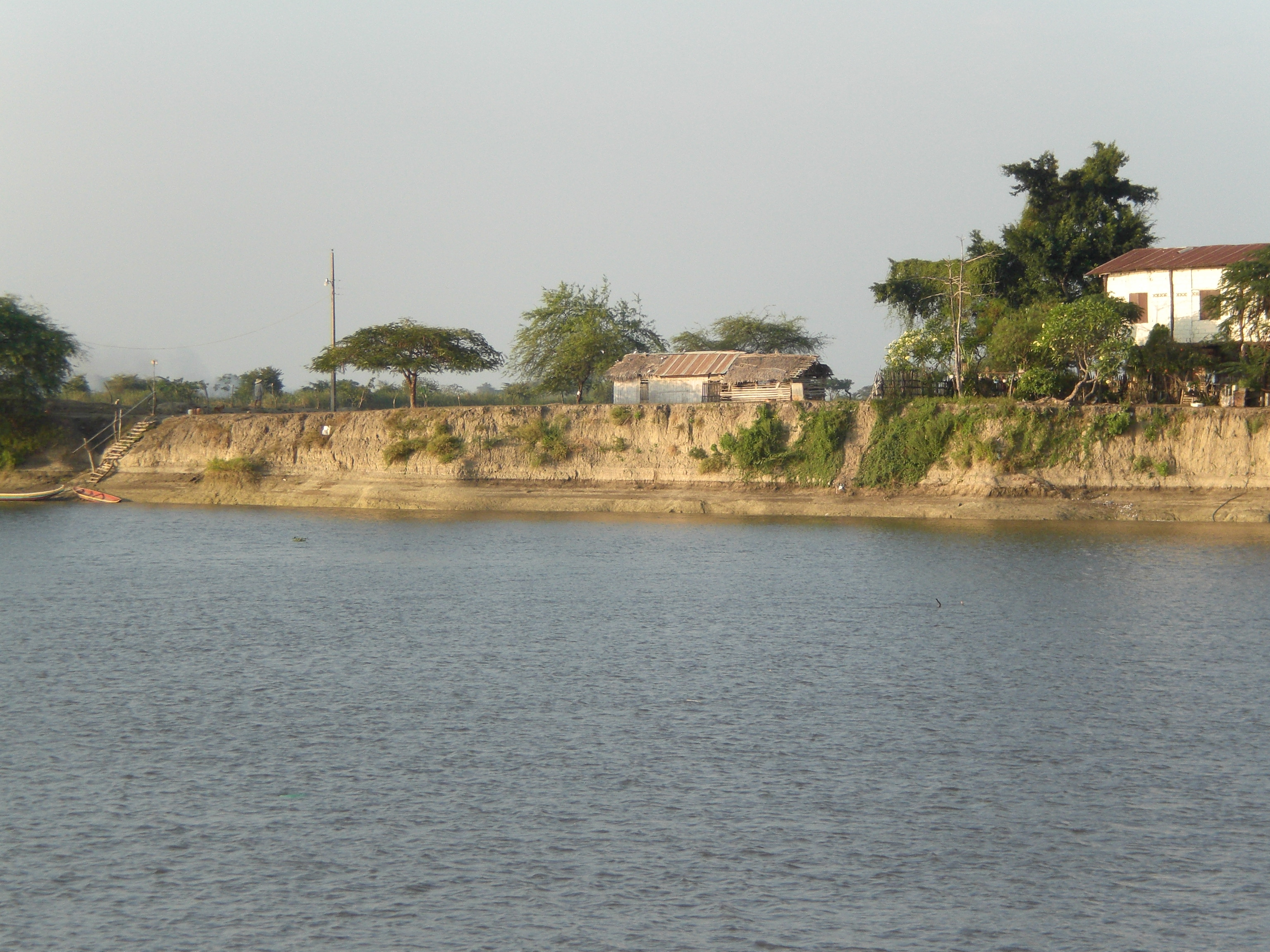
- The Daule River as it passes through Nobol, Ecuador.

- Location within Ecuador
- Coordinates: 1.916671°S 80.011539°W
- Country: Ecuador
- Province: Guayas
- Canton: Nobol Canton
- Parishes: List of urban parishes

Area
  - Town: 1.96 km^{2} (0.76 sq mi)

Population (2022 census)
  - Town: 10,010
  - Density: 5,110/km^{2} (13,200/sq mi)
- Time zone: UTC-5 (ECT)
- Climate: Aw

Nobol (also known as Narcisa de Jesús) is a town located in central Guayas, Ecuador. It is the seat of Nobol Canton, created in 1992.

As of the census of 2022, Nobol Canton had a population of 23,850. The town is situated about 38.5 kilometres (24 mi) north of Guayaquil. Nobol was the birthplace of Narcisa de Jesús, who was canonized by Pope Benedict XVI on October 12, 2008, and the Santuario de Santa Narcisa de Jesus Martillo y Morán located in the town center was dedicated to her on August 22, 1998.

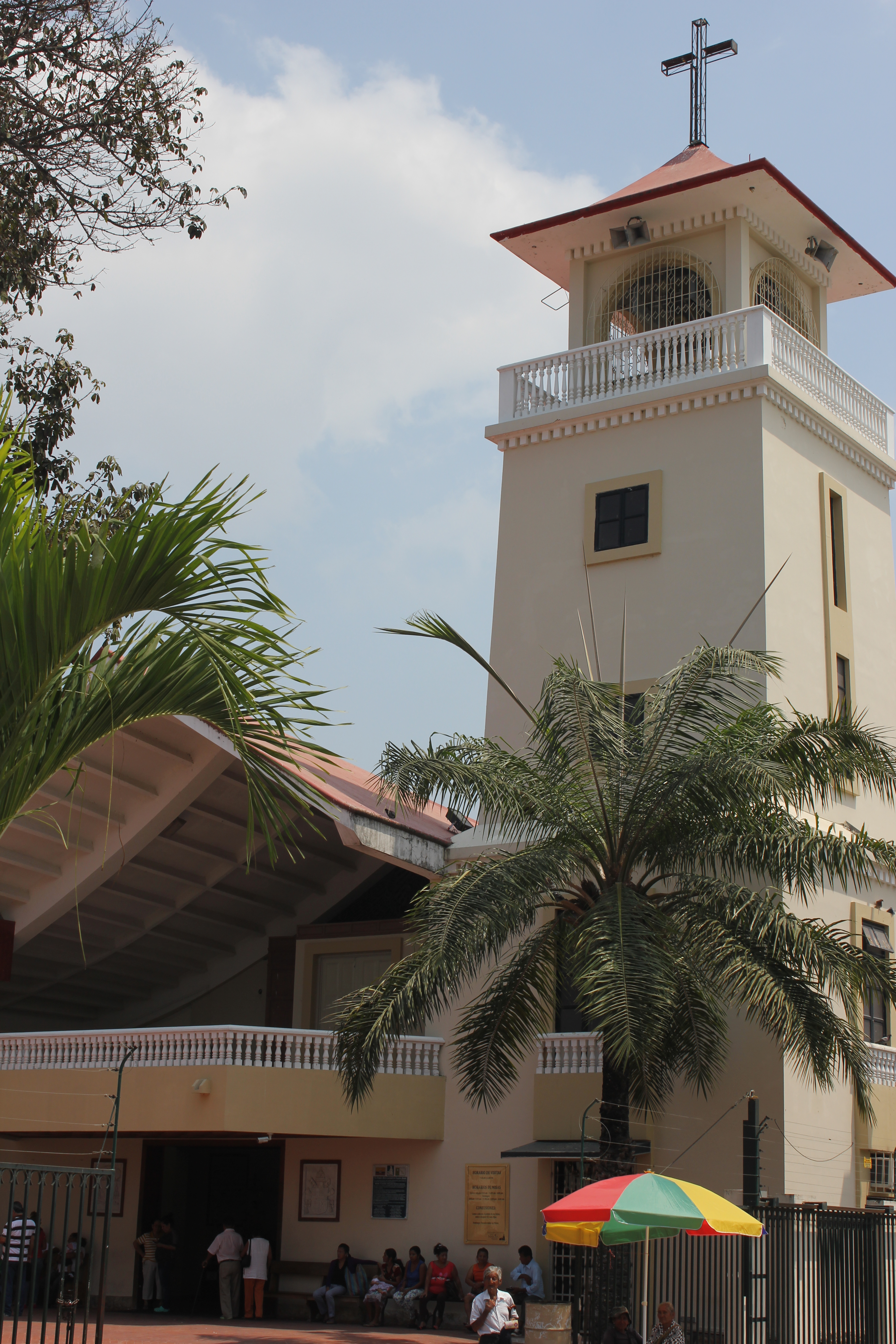
The Santuario de Santa Narcisa de Jesus Martillo y Morán in Nobol.
