= List of hotels: Countries E =

This is a list of what are intended to be the notable top hotels by country, five or four star hotels, notable skyscraper landmarks or historic hotels which are covered in multiple reliable publications. It should not be a directory of every hotel in every country:

== Easter Island ==
- Iorana Hotel, Isla de Pascua

== Ecuador ==
- Arashá Spa
- Hotel Plaza Grande, Quito
- Madre Tierra Resort and Spa, Vilcabamba

== Egypt ==
- Cairo Marriott Hotel, Cairo
- Coralia, Dahab
- El-Gouna, Red Sea Riviera
- Ghazala Gardens hotel, Sharm el-Sheikh
- Grand Hyatt Cairo, Cairo
- Hilton Taba, Taba
- Maritim Jolie Ville Resort, Sharm el-Sheikh
- Mövenpick Hotels & Resorts
- Old Winter Palace Hotel, Luxor
- Rotana Hotels, Cairo
- San Stefano Grand Plaza, Alexandria
- Shepheard's Hotel, Cairo
- Sofitel Cairo El Gezirah, Cairo
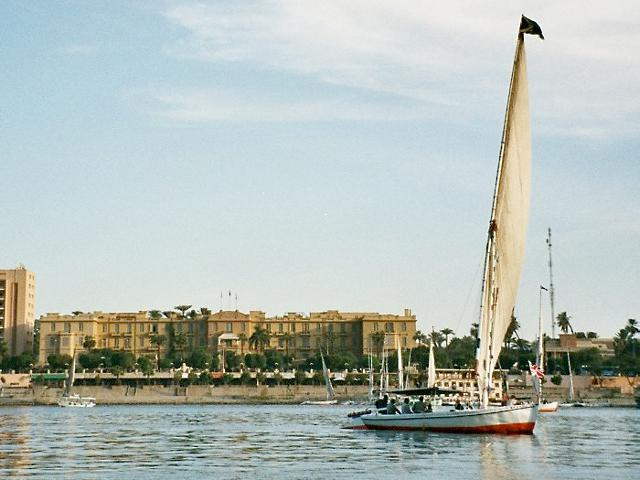
Old Winter Palace Hotel, Luxor

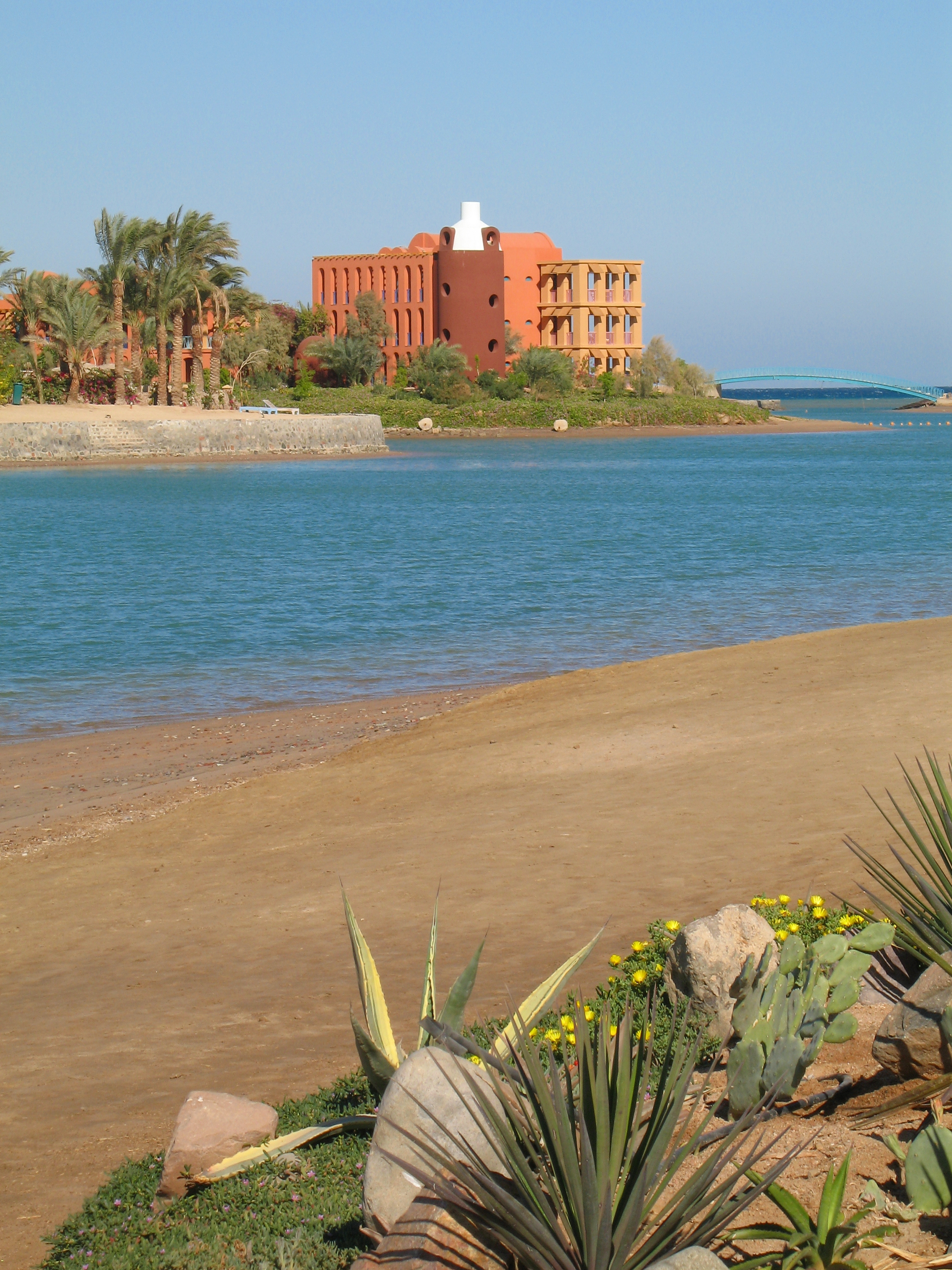
El-Gouna

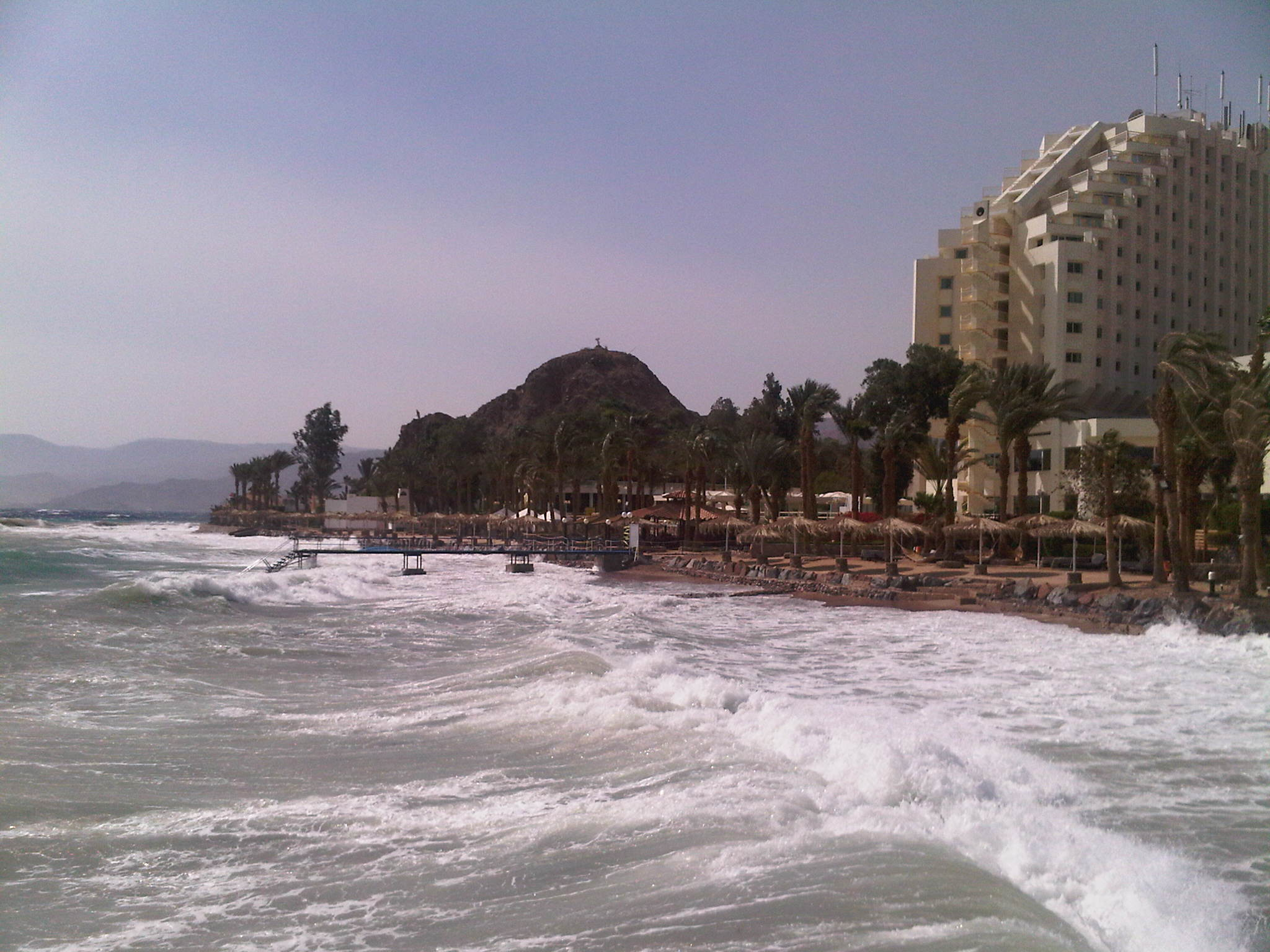
Hilton Taba

== El Salvador ==
- Hilton Princess San Salvador Hotel, San Salvador

== Ethiopia ==
- Churchill Hotel, Addis Ababa
- Delano Hotel, Bahir Dar
- Plaza Hotel, Addis Ababa
