= Enrique Gomezjurado =

Ecuadorian painter (1891–1978)

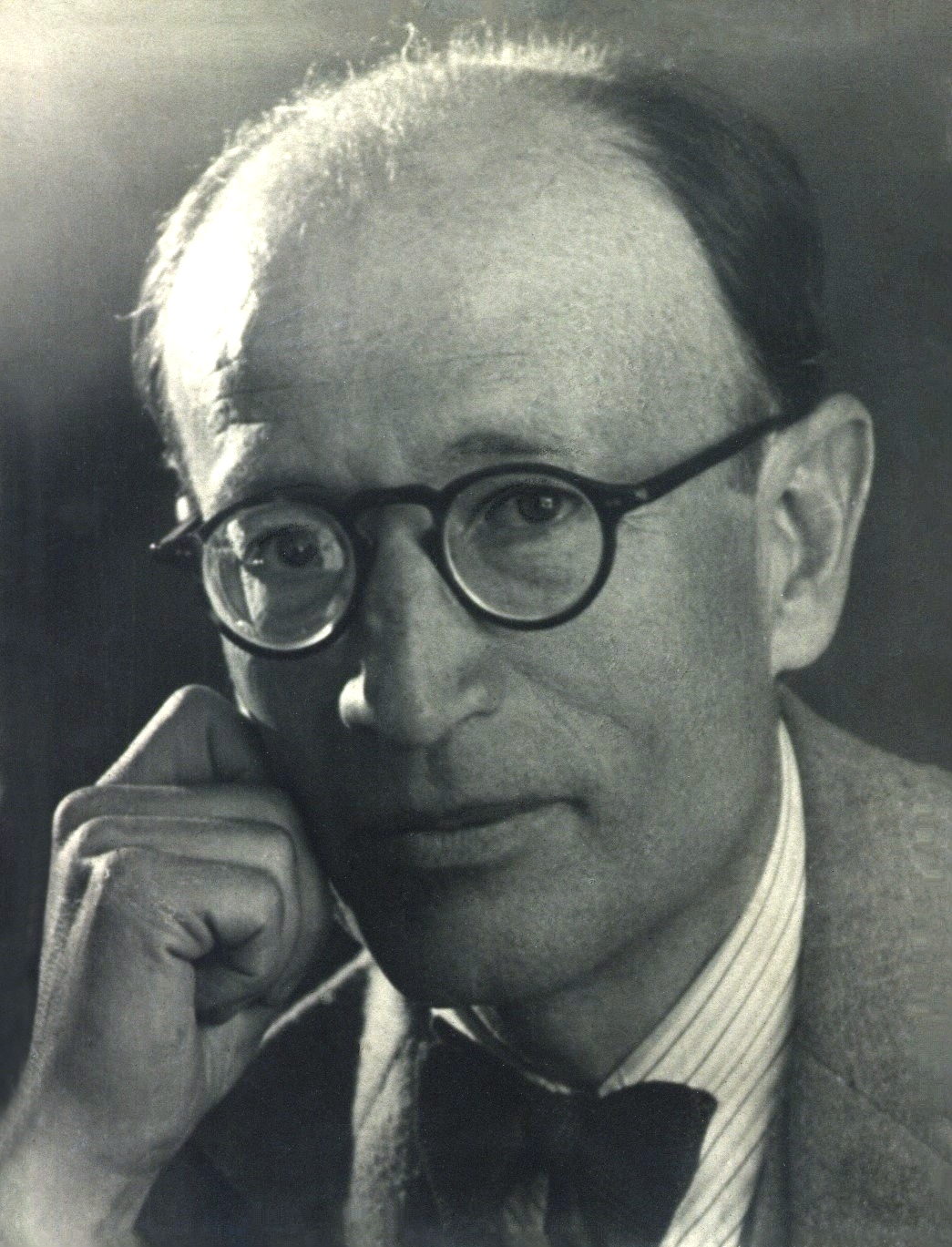
- Born: Luis Enrique Marcial Gomezjurado Flores; 16 January 1891; Quito, Ecuador
- Died: 21 September 1978 (aged 87); Quito, Ecuador
- Known for: Portraiture
- Movement: Academic Art, Impressionism
- Spouse: Rosario Solórzano Freire (m. 1922)

Signature
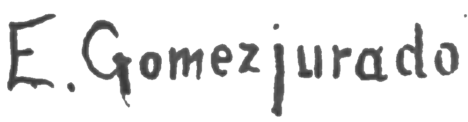

Luis Enrique Marcial Gomezjurado Flores (16 January 1891 – 21 September 1978) was an Ecuadorian painter, one of the most notable academic artists of the first decades of the 20th century. He specialized in the human figure and excelled in the portrait, also highlighted in Genre painting.

== Early life ==
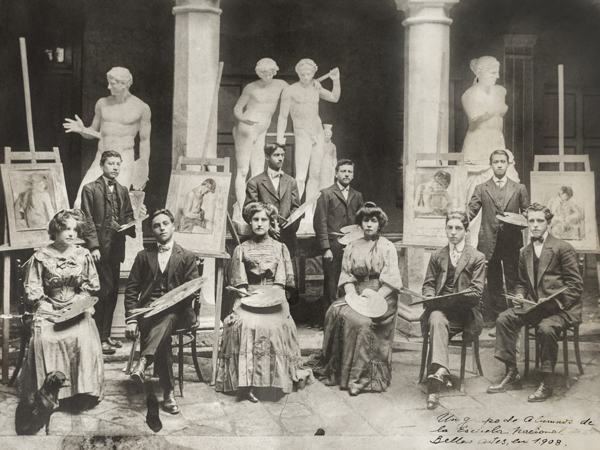
Students of the Fine Arts School of Quito. 1908. In the back row, on the left and standing Enrique Gomezjurado,

He was born in Quito on January 16, 1891. He was the third son of Justo Pastor Gomezjurado y Gomezjurado and Mariana Flores Abarca, conservative landowners, his father from Ibarra and his mother from Ambato, settled in Quito in 1880.

He studied at the school of De la Salle Brothers, and there he was student of Brother Miguel.

In 1905, when he was 14 years old, he entered the School of Fine Arts of Quito, re-founded in 1904 by the Ecuadorian government, where he was a student of the Spanish painter León Camarero, among others.

As a student at the Fine Arts school of Quito, he obtained his first honorific recognitions, in 1907 and 1908.

In the National Exhibition of 1909 he obtained the Bronze Medal with two Natural Studies and in 1911 he dictated his first chair of Drawing in the Fine Arts School of Quito, and in 1916 he was professor of Drawing in the Juan Montalvo College.

== Early career ==
He achieved the Second and Third prize simultaneously at the National Exhibition of 1914, with his paintings El Zapatero and Paisaje.

He specialized in the human figure and participated in dissections, constantly studying the anatomy of the human body.

In 1919, he won the second prize of Mariano Aguilera, with a painting entitled The Indian Mayor and in 1920 he won the Silver Medal for his painting Escenas del Campo.

== Move to Panama ==
In 1920 he traveled to Europe to perfect his knowledge, exhibited in Spain, where he was a pupil of the painter José Mongrell. He also exhibited in Italy and France.

In 1922, he married in Quito, with Rosario Solórzano Freire and in the same year he traveled to Panama, where he worked designing capitals for theaters, museums and churches of the Central American country. He was also a professor at the School of Fine Arts of Panama, a country where that his first three children were born; Ernesto, painter better known as Marco Ernesto, Gustavo and his daughter Alicia Gomezjurado, also an artist.

He exhibited in the United States, Panama, Cuba, Uruguay, Costa Rica and Colombia.

In 1930, he traveled back to Ecuador, along with his wife and children.

== Return to Ecuador ==
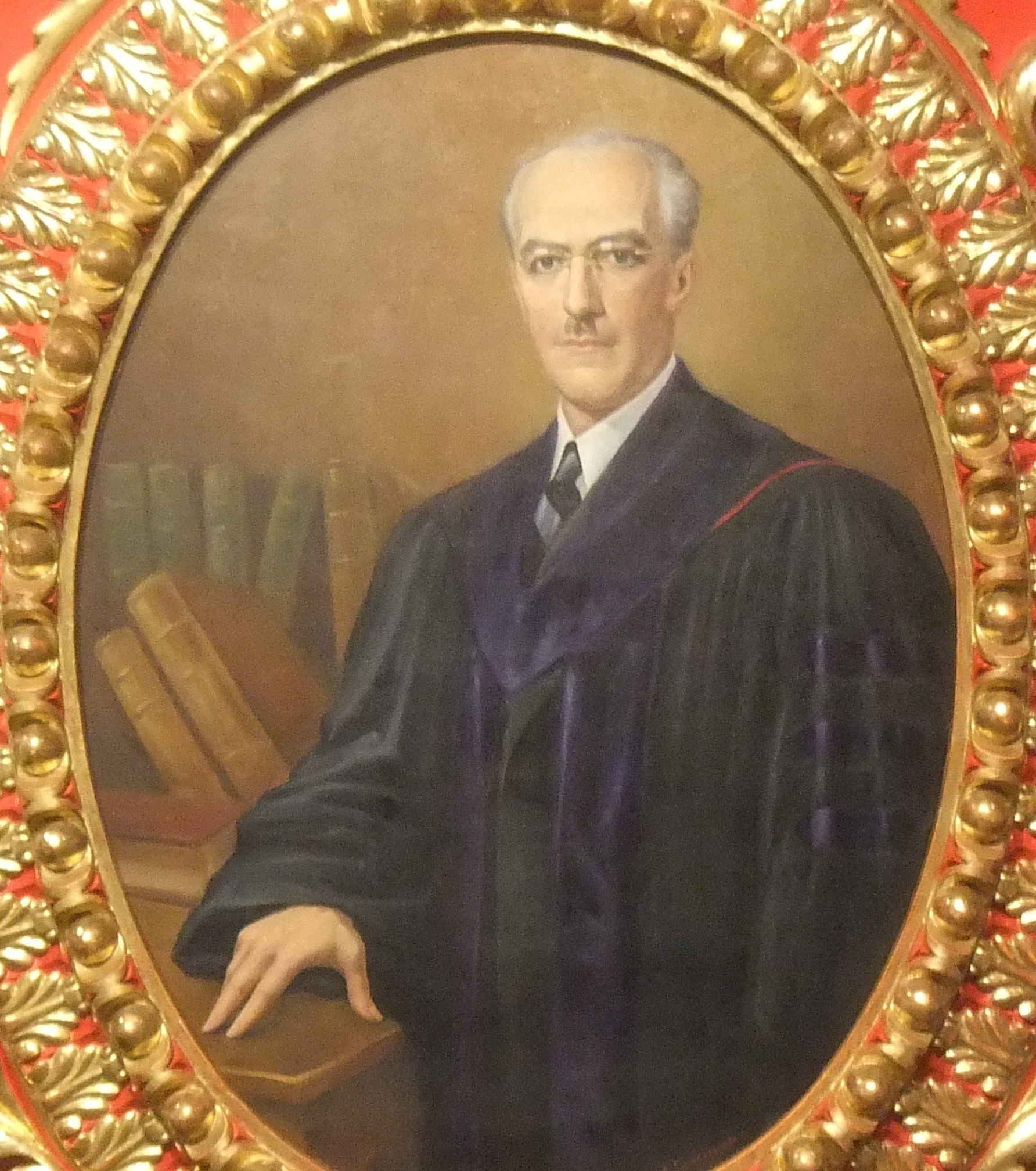
Portrait of Jacinto Jijón y Caamaño. Quito, National Museum of Ecuador.

Upon his return in 1930, he was appointed professor of the Fine Arts School of Quito, in that decade he painted several portraits. In 1935, the municipalities of the Republic of Ecuador, decided to give an oil painting by Eloy Alfaro to the Municipal Council of Quito, a portrait painted by the artist. In 1936, on the Bicentennial of the arrival of the Spanish-French Geodesic Mission to Ecuador and as a member of the Comité France-Amerique, he painted the Portrait of Pedro Vicente Maldonado, which is in the Alberto Mena Caamaño Museum, known as the "Wax Museum", in Quito.

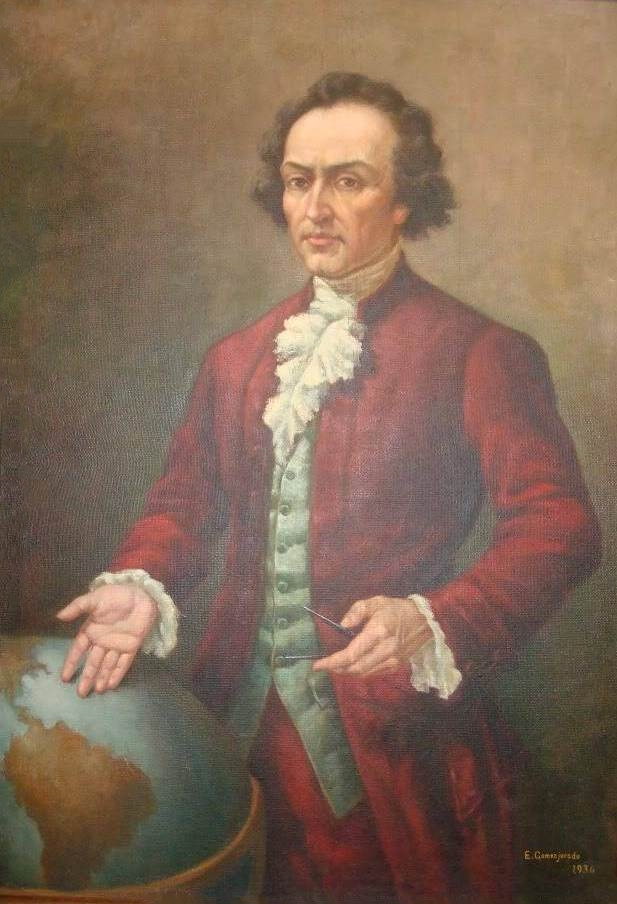
Portrait of Vicente Maldonado (1936) Alberto Mena Caamaño Museum (Wax Museum) Quito, Ecuador.

In the following years he made several portraits; Ignacio de Loyola, Leonidas Plaza Gutierrez, Brother Miguel, Portrait of Jacinto Jijón y Caamaño, which is in the National Museum of Ecuador. In 1939, he painted the Portrait of Federico González Suárez.

In 1941, he won the First Prize in the Simón Bolívar Libertador Portraits Contest, an event organized in Ecuador by delegates from several American nations. In 1955, he won the second place in the III Biennial of Hispanic-American Art, held in Barcelona, Spain and in 1957 he painted his oil Miseria, obtaining favorable review.

He approached the genre painting taking impressionism within his academic training, he painted Andean landscapes, seascapes, scenes of manners, philosophical themes and indigenist theme with predilection, constantly studying the indigenous physiognomy, made several works within this theme; Virgins of the Sun, The Last Days of Huaya Cápac, Rumiñahui, The Priostes, Indigenous Procession. Examples of his painting of genre and landscapes were The Tuna War, The Cotacachi Lake, Indian Market, The Pichincha.

He admired the Ecuadorian painter Antonio Salguero, as well as the work of Diego Velázquez, Joaquín Sorolla and Rembrandt .

In 1951 he was appointed Officer of the French Academy of Fine Arts, in 1961 the Central University of Ecuador awarded him the "Teacher Merit" award.

He died in Quito, on September 21, 1978, his remains rest in the Cemetery of El Batán in Quito.
