= Ammende Villa =

Building in Pärnu, Estonia

Coordinates: 58°22′48.98″N 24°29′32.69″E

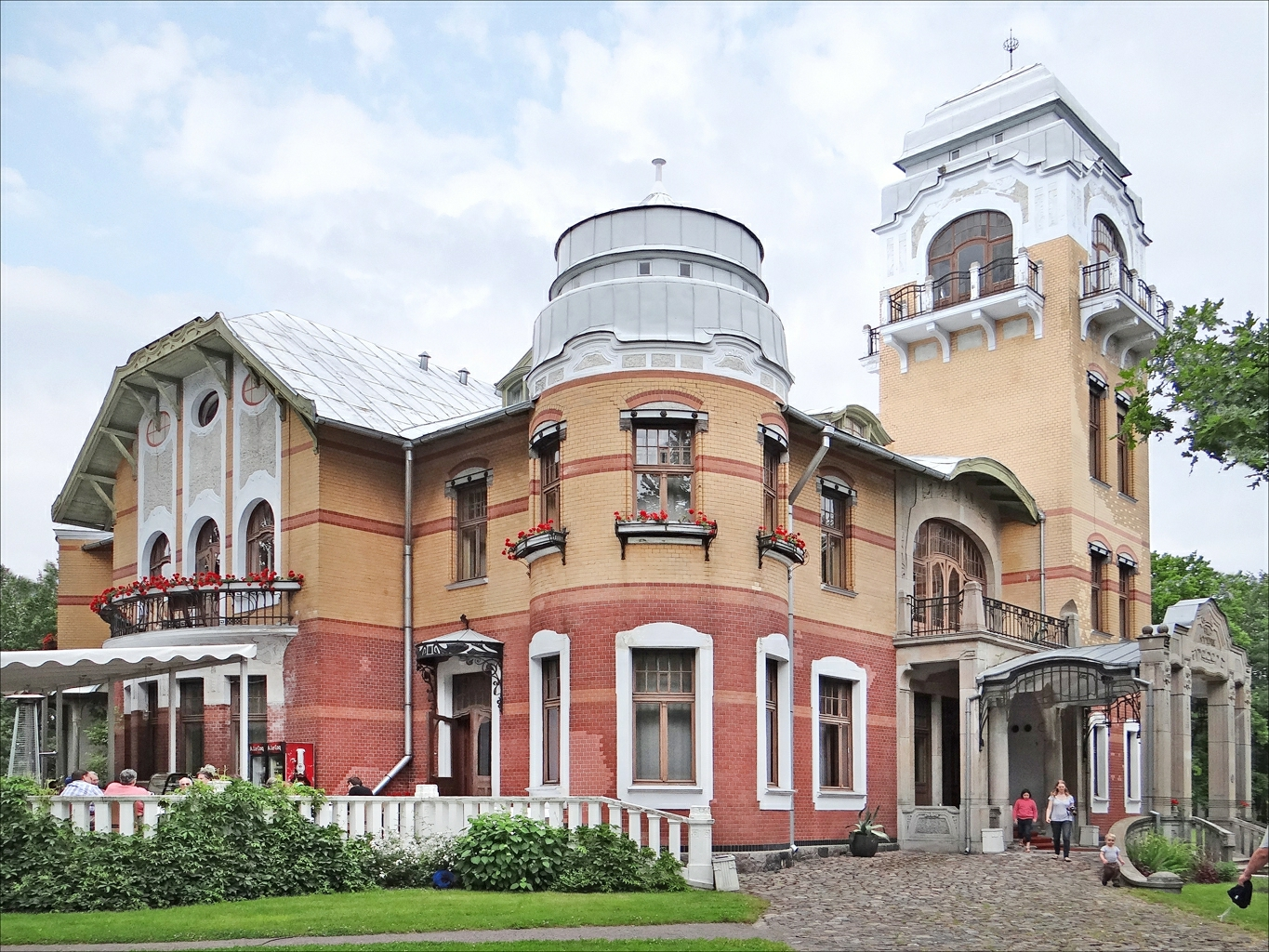
- Overview of the Ammende Villa.
- Interactive map of the Ammende Villa area

General information
- Location: Pärnu, Estonia, Mere Pst 7, 80010
- Opening: 1999

Technical details
- Floor count: 2

Design and construction
- Architects: Frithiof (Fyodor) Mieritz & Ivan Gerasimov

Other information
- Number of rooms: 17 plus 4 double and 1 single deluxe room in the Gardener's House
- Number of suites: 5 two-room suites
- Number of restaurants: 1
- Parking: Yes

Website
- Ammende Villa Hotel & Restaurant

Ammende Villa is a mansion house and a cultural heritage monument located in Pärnu, Estonia. It is one of the most impressive early examples of Art Nouveau architecture in the country. It now serves as a luxury hotel in the health resort area of Pärnu.

== History ==
The Ammende Villa, with a large garden and adjacent forest, was built in 1904 by local magnate merchant Hermann-Leopold Ammende through St. Petersburg's architecture offices Mieritz & Gerasimov in commissioning for the wedding of his daughter. Since its creation, the mansion has served many purposes as a summer casino and club, health establishment, library, and also as a dental clinic during Soviet times, before being restored and converted in 1999 into a hotel by two Estonian businessmen. With spacious halls, salons and rooms furnished in authentic period style, the hotel is located close to the beach and a short-distance walk from the old town.

== See also ==
- List of hotels: Estonia
