= Plaza de la Independencia =

Plaza in Ecuador

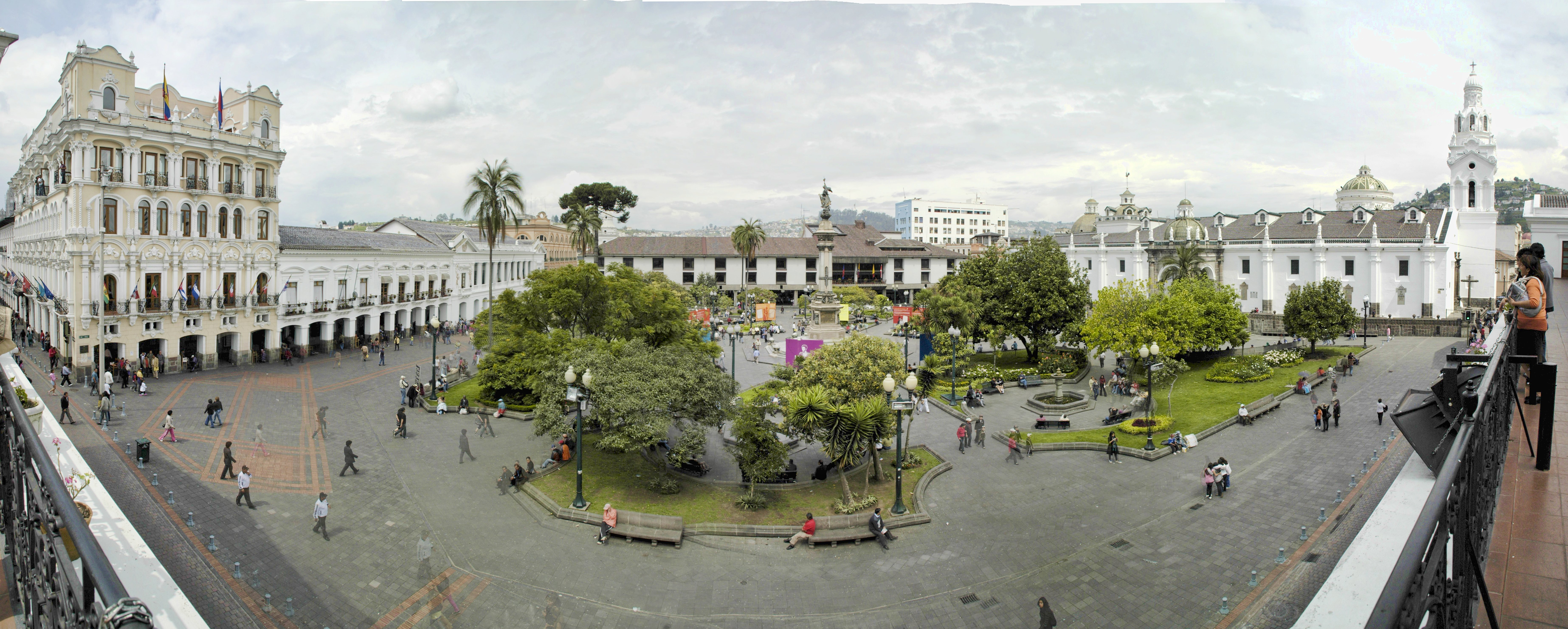
Plaza de la Independencia

Independence Square (Spanish: Plaza de la Independencia, or colloquially as Plaza Grande) is the principal and central public square of Quito, Ecuador. This is the central square of the city and one of the symbols of the executive power of the nation. Its main feature is the monument to the independence heroes of August 10, 1809, the date remembered as the first cry of independence of the Royal Audience of Quito from the Spanish monarchy. The square is flanked by the Carondelet Palace, the Metropolitan Cathedral, the Archbishop's Palace, the Municipal Palace and the Plaza Grande Hotel.

The square is surrounded by the following four streets: Calle Venezuela (east), Calle Chile (north), Calle Gabriel García Moreno (west) and the pedestrian segment of Calle Eugenio Espejo (south).

== History ==
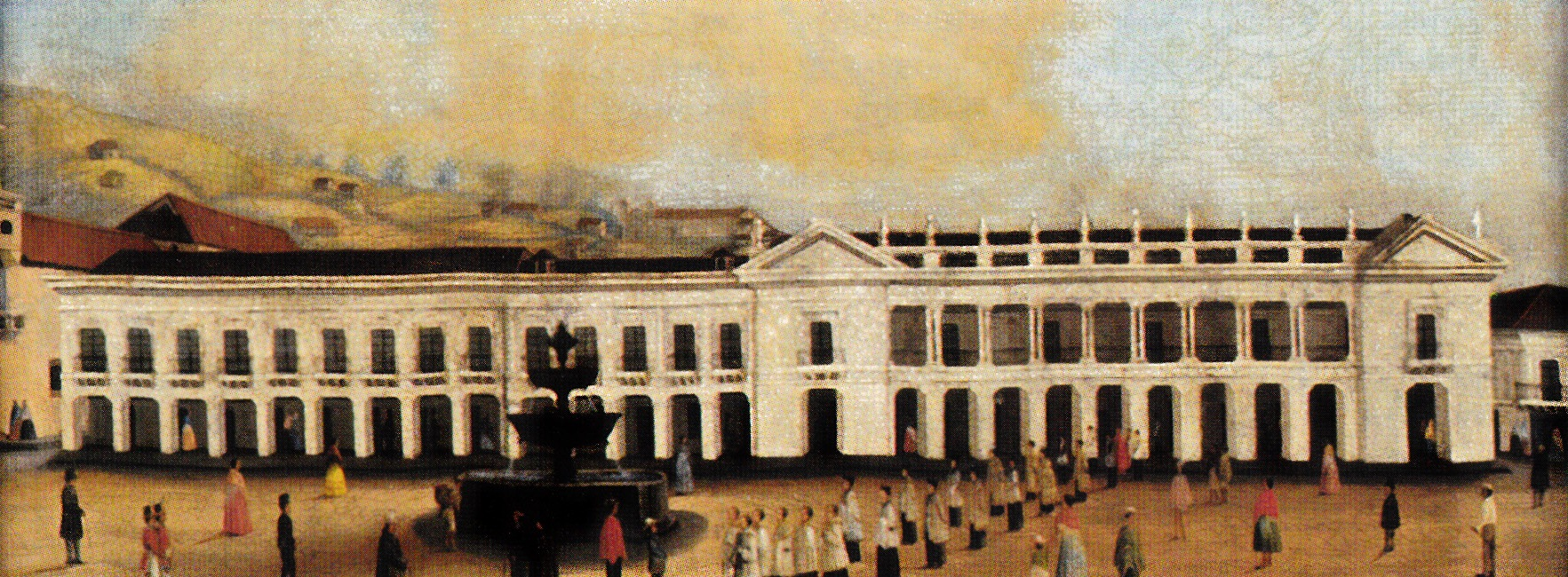
Palacio Arzobispal de Quito - Anónimo - 19th century - (siglo XIX) Plaza de la Independencia

Although the first colonial town square was what today is known as Plazoleta Benalcázar, this has always been considered as tentative as it got up a path suitable for novice Spanish town of Quito. It was only in the 17th century, in the year 1612, when the powers of the city moved to the area around the Plaza Grande, they decided to call this way for being the largest at the time.

=== Creation ===
Initially it was just an esplanade of packed dirt that was placed in a water source to supply the vital liquid to the neighbors. Being larger than the tentative square, and unemployed land still be around, some institutions decided to stand on its flanks. Thus the Catholic Church acquired land in the north and south sides, where they built the main temple of the city (Cathedral of Quito) and the headquarters of the archdiocese (Archbishop's Palace).

One of the founders of the city, the Captain Juan de Díaz Hidalgo, reserved to himself a lot on the corner of the square near the Archbishop's Palace, where he built his home (the only private building that endures to this day) that palace would later be called Palacio Hidalgo. Other families, also founders of the town, occupied the western end, but after the earthquake of 1627, were overturned by the serious damage that occurred in structures, and instead built the Palacio de Carondelet.

Finally, on the eastern side of the square was constructed the structure for the nascent city council, construction was also demolished in the 1970s to build the city hall known as Municipality of Quito, for if it fulfills the same functions as the original, is a modern building.

=== 16th to 19th centuries ===
For several years after its founding, the Plaza Grande was nothing but a paved plaza with a beautiful fountain in the center, around which rose at times a makeshift bullring to celebrate some festivities offered by the council on behalf of the Spanish crown.

Only in the eighteenth century it thinks of the place as a true square, the style of European cities. The president of the Royal Audience of Quito conceived the square landscapes, to serve as a garden for the Palacio de Carondelet. The palace topped its steps in the square and prohibited the passage of carts through the western edge of the square, which was next to Carondelet.

The square was reformed again in the early nineteenth century; withdraw the steps of the palace, now ended in the side streets of the building, and enabled again the passage of cars by the then called Calle de las 7 Cruces (now Garcia Moreno).

=== Modern period ===
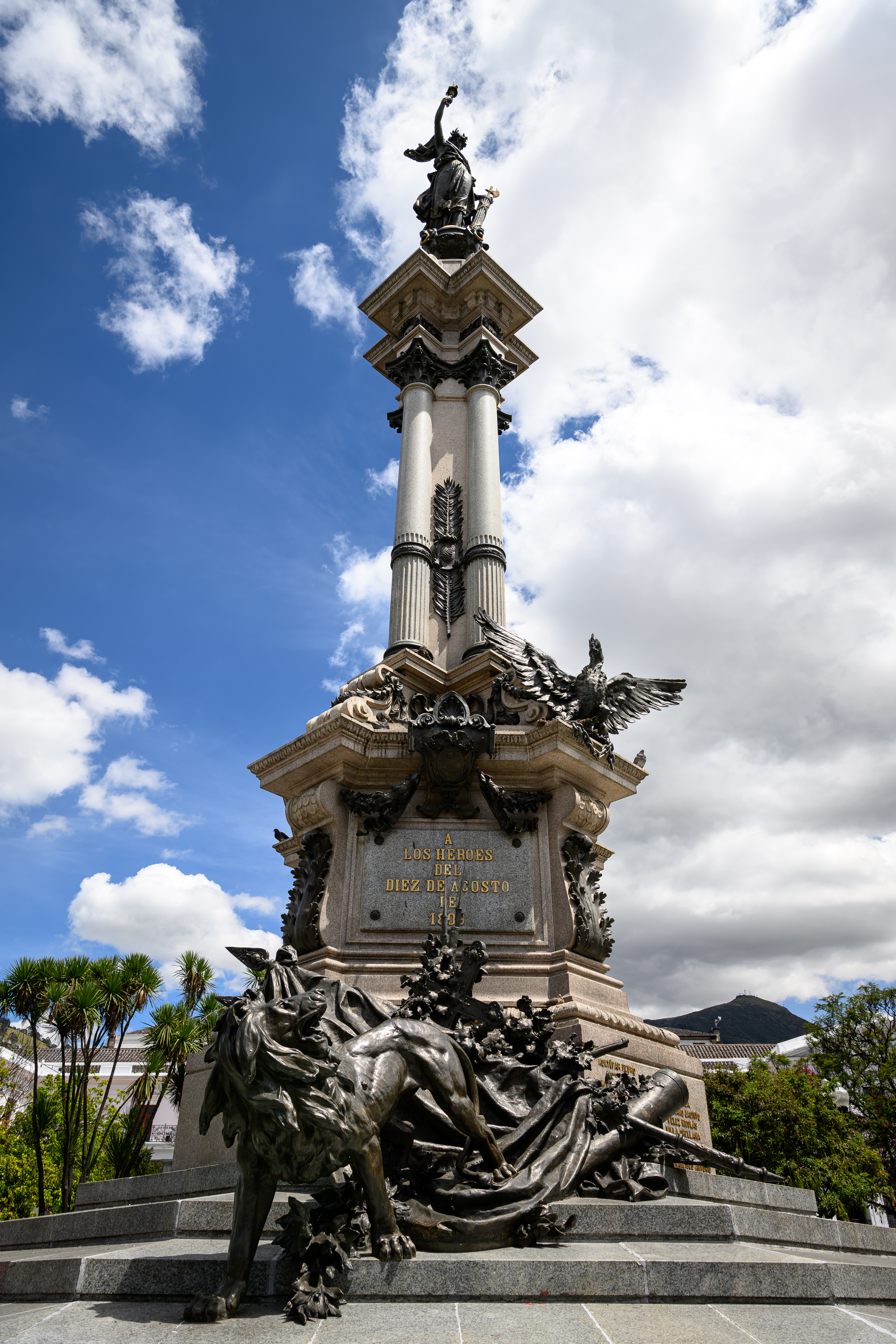
Independence Monument

After many petitions by the municipal authorities, Ecuadorian President Eloy Alfaro ordered the construction in the Plaza of a monument to commemorate the centenary of the "first cry of independence". A French sculpture was commissioned in 1898 and placed in the center of the square, replacing the fountain which was moved to the southwest of the square. In a public ceremony in 1906, the President and Mayor unveiled the "Independence Monument" and changed the colonial name ("Plaza Grande") to "Plaza de la Independencia". Since then only minor changes have been made in the square, which retains its centrality in the national consciousness.

== Buildings ==
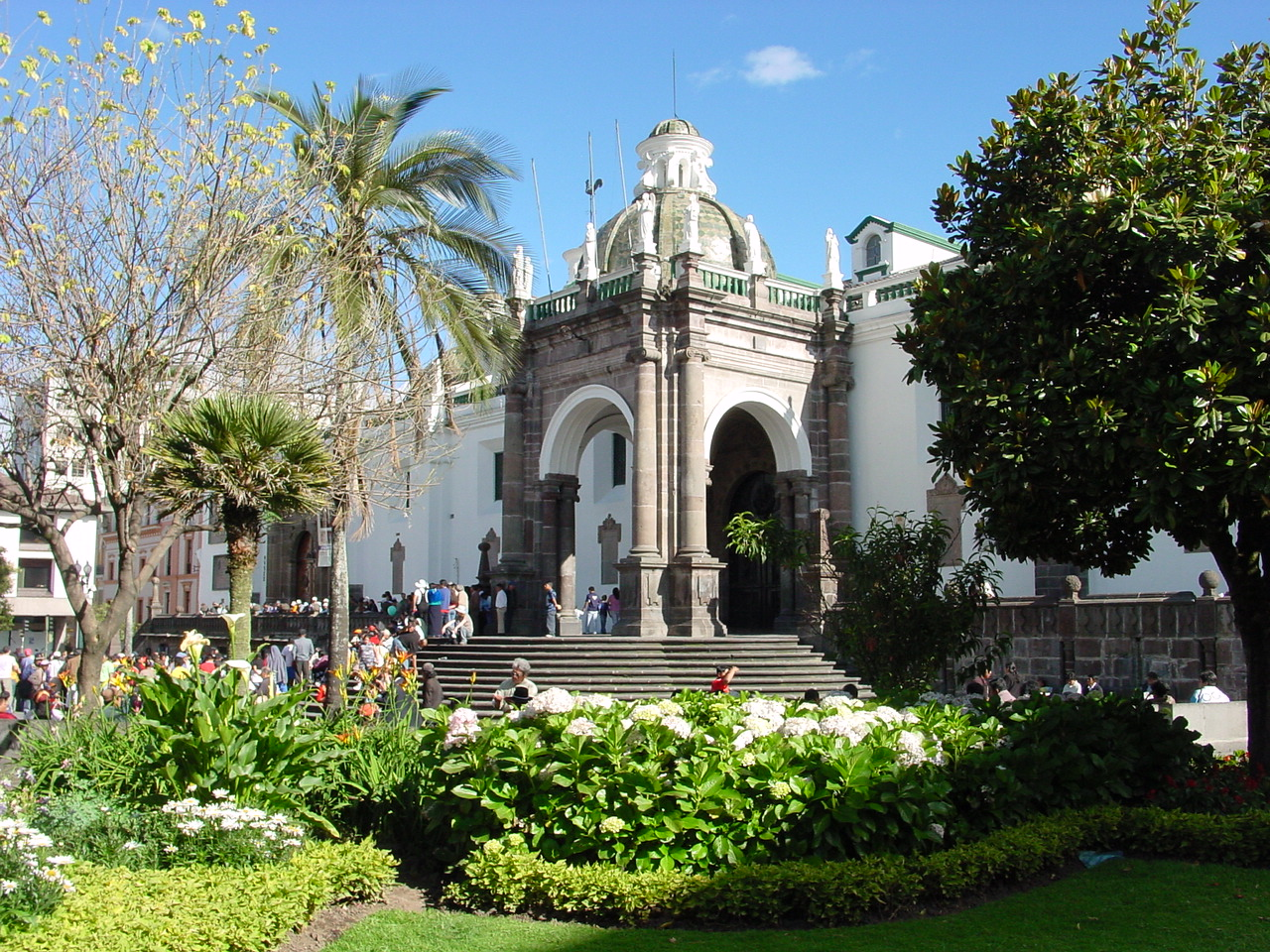
Side entrance to the cathedral, in the square at Metropolitan Cathedral of Quito

The square is flanked on four sides by monumental buildings, all of which — except the Municipality — date to the colonial period. Likewise all — except the Palace Hidalgo — are open to the public. They are:

- Southeast: Building of the Municipality of Quito (Municipio de Quito)
- Northeast: Archbishop's Palace and Hotel Plaza Grande (Palace Hidalgo)
- Northwest: Palacio de Carondelet (presidential palace of Ecuador)
- Southwest: Cathedral of Quito

In addition, at the corners of the Plaza Grande, are four more notable buildings:

- Banco del Pichincha (historic building)
- House of Manuela Sáenz (now occupied by FONSAL offices)
- Alberto Mena Caamaño Museum
- Church and Convent of the Immaculate Conception
