= Pedro Vicente Maldonado =

Ecuadorian scientist (1704–1748)

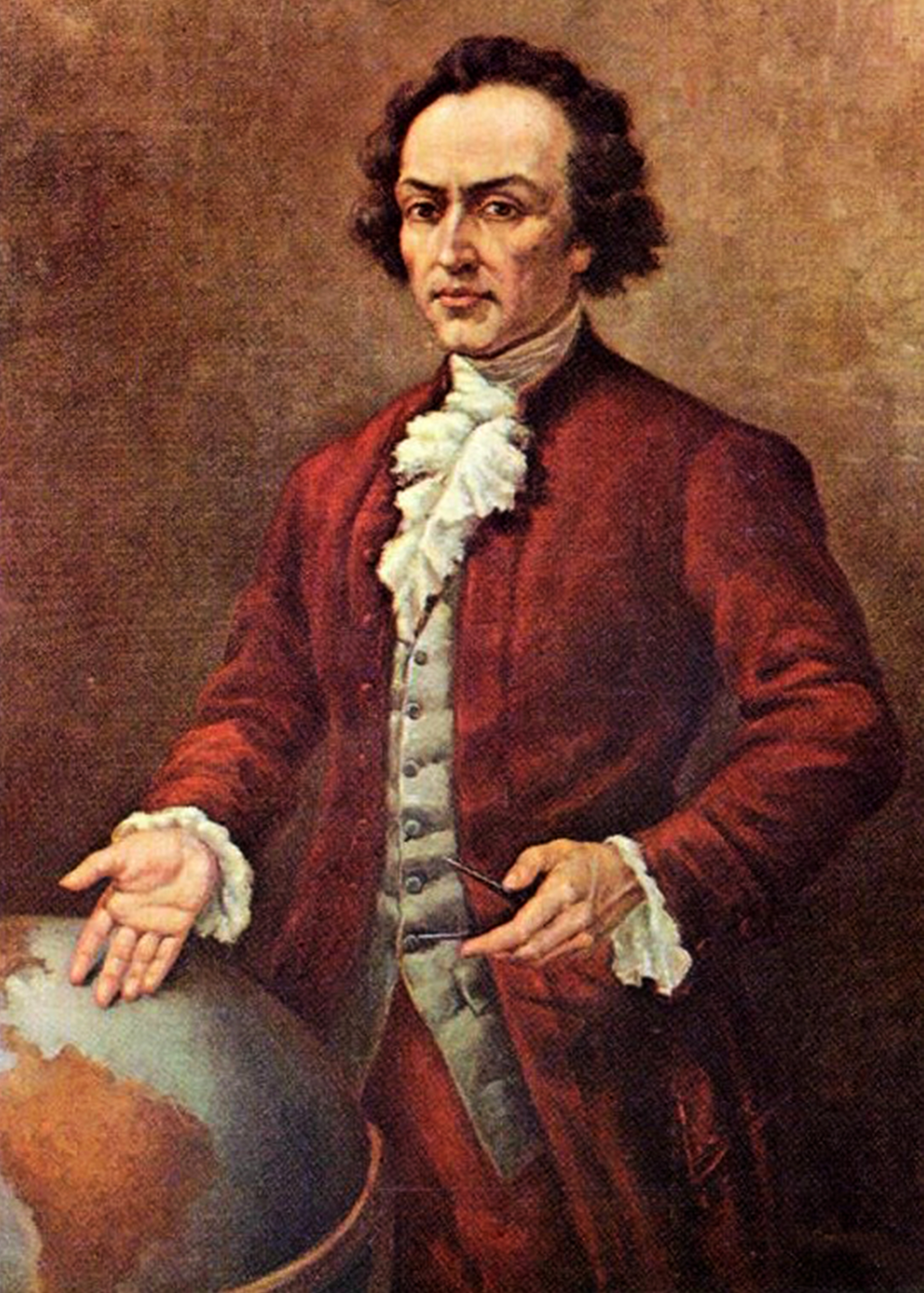
- Portrait of Pedro Vicente Maldonado (1936), by Enrique Gomezjurado, in Alberto Mena Caamaño Museum, Quito, Ecuador.
- Born: Pedro Vicente Maldonado Palomino y Flores; November 24, 1704; Riobamba, Viceroyalty of Peru (present-day Ecuador)
- Died: November 7, 1748 (aged 43); London, England
- Occupations: Horseman of the Golden Key; Gentleman of the Camera; Lieutenant of Magistrate; Governor of the Emerald Province; Mayor of the City of Riobamba
- Known for: The Spanish-French Geodesic Mission

Signature
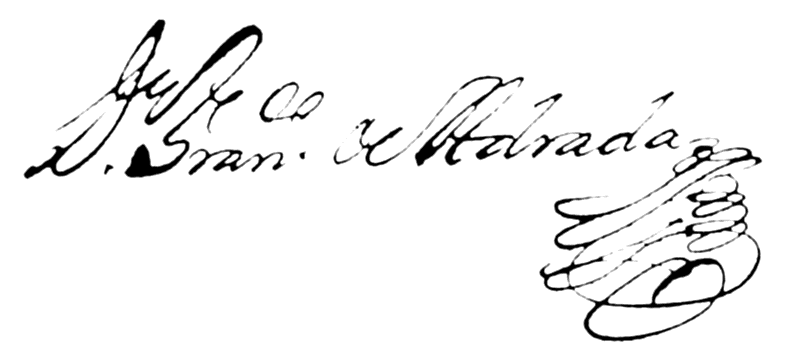

Pedro Vicente Maldonado y Flores (November 24, 1704 in Riobamba, Royal Audience of Quito (today's Ecuador) – November 7, 1748 in London, England) was an Ecuadorian scientist who collaborated with the members of the French Geodesic Mission. As well as a physicist and a mathematician, Maldonado was an astronomer, topographer, and geographer.

== Biography ==
Maldonado’s parents were Don Pedro Antonio Maldonado Sotomayor and Doña María Flores Palomino, both of whom were of high economic and social standing, they came from one of the most important families of the country. His genealogy belongs to one of the first and most important marquis in Ecuador's history. He completed his primary education in Riobamba, the city of his birth, and in 1718, traveled to Quito where he attended the Colegio San Luis, where, under the supervision of the Jesuits, he learned arithmetic, geometry, Latin, astronomy, and music. On May 19, 1721, he received his teaching degree from the Gregorian University and later returned to Riobamba to be an educator at the Jesuit school. His family settled in Latacunga at Cotopaxi province.

From an early age, Maldonado was interested in the mysteries of nature, and between 1722 and 1724 undertook many explorations of unknown regions to study the land’s geography in great detail; he completed his first map in 1725. He again returned to his birthplace to care for his estate and remained there until 1720, when he moved to Quito. On February 5, 1730, Maldonado married the daughter of the Governor of Popayán, and gained the advantage of being related to a powerful, influential family. He returned to Riobamba in 1724 and was elected mayor of Cabildo in his first election; he was later named Lieutenant of the Magistrate. In spite of occupying these administrative positions, Maldonado did not neglect his scientific observations. That same year, he presented a proposal before the Viceroy of Peru, José de Armendáriz, to link the Royal Audience of Quito with Panama. It was the first of his many projects involving commerce routes and transportation.

In 1736, he collaborated with the Spanish-French Geodesic Mission, whose primary objective, until 1743, was the measurement of the value of a degree of terrestrial meridian arc in the proximity of an equinoctial line. Maldonado befriended many of its members, most notably Charles Marie de La Condamine. Two years later, he assumed the position of Governor of Esmeraldas Province on January 20, 1742, and elevated his brothers to a position of political power so that they could take part in the government. After the death of his first wife, Maldonado returned to Quito and married doña María Ventura Martínez de Arredondo in 1743.

In 1744, Maldonado visited Europe. In Spain, in 1746, he was received by Philip V, who bestowed upon him the title of "Gentleman of the Royal Camera" and proclaimed him Governor of Atacames, with a state-sanctioned pension to last for two generations.

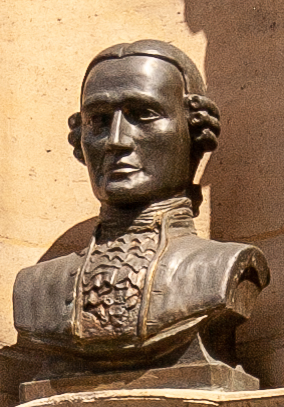
Maldonado's statue in Paris, by Ecuadorian sculptor Héctor Flores Franco.

From Madrid, he traveled to Paris, where he was received as a member of the French Academy of Sciences on March 24, 1747 based on reports about his merits from other geologists who knew him in Quito, giving him the opportunity to print his "General Map." That same year he traveled through the Netherlands and in August 1748, was transferred to London, where he was invited to participate in meetings of the Royal Society as one of its members, but he died before he could be inducted. His remains were interred in the St James's Church, Piccadilly, leaving behind a vast legacy of scientific study and research. A memorial to him also lies within the church.

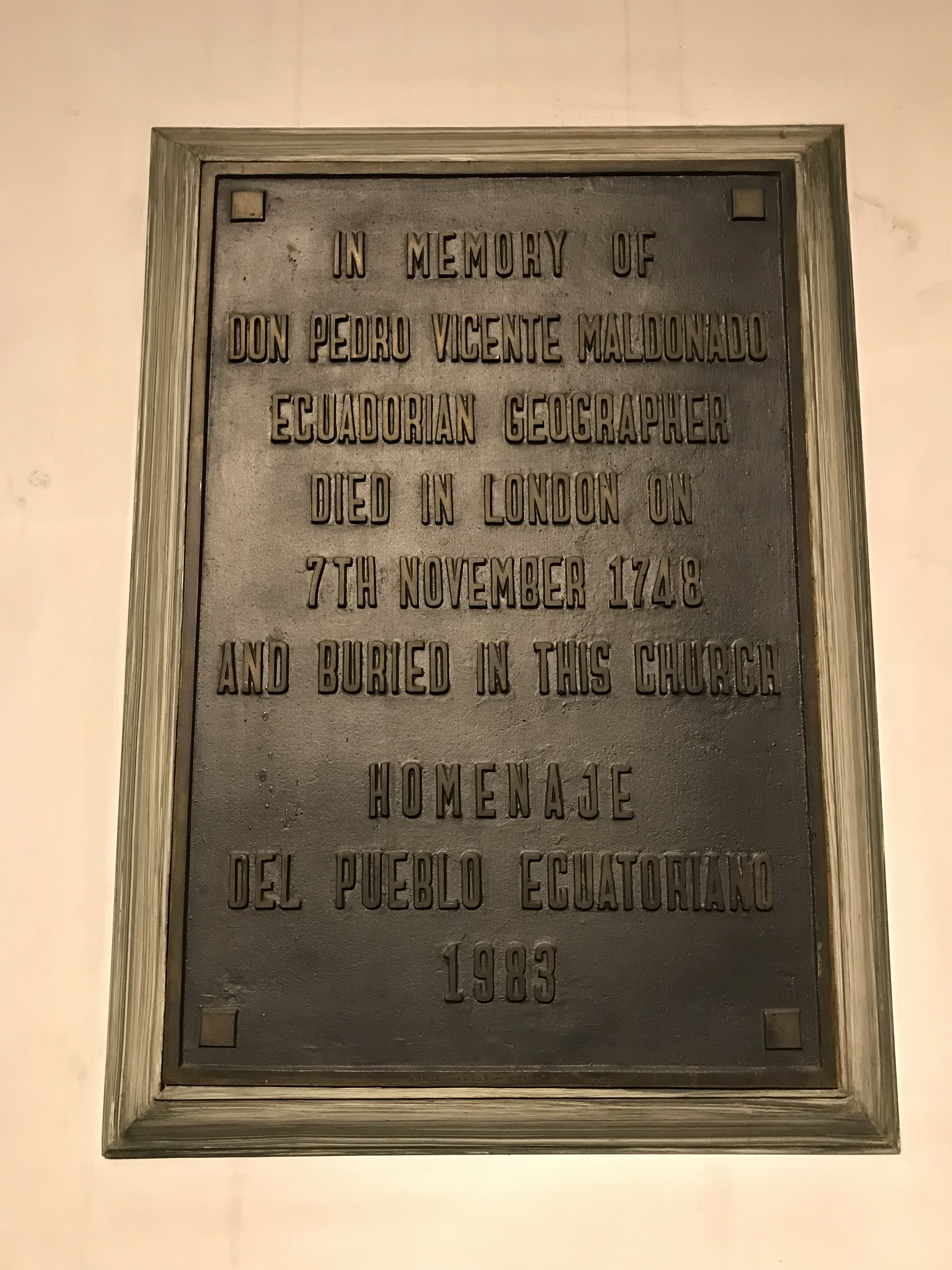
A memorial to Pedro Vicente Maldonado in St James's Church, Piccadilly.

== Titles ==
- In Spain
  - Horseman of the Golden Key
  - Gentleman of the Camera – Equivalent to Guarding the Honor of His Catholic Majesty
  - Lieutenant of Magistrate
- In France
  - First Corresponding Member of the Parisian Science Academy for Latin Americans
- In the Ecuadorian Royal Court of Quito
  - Governor of the Emerald Province
  - Mayor of the City of Riobamba

== Honors ==
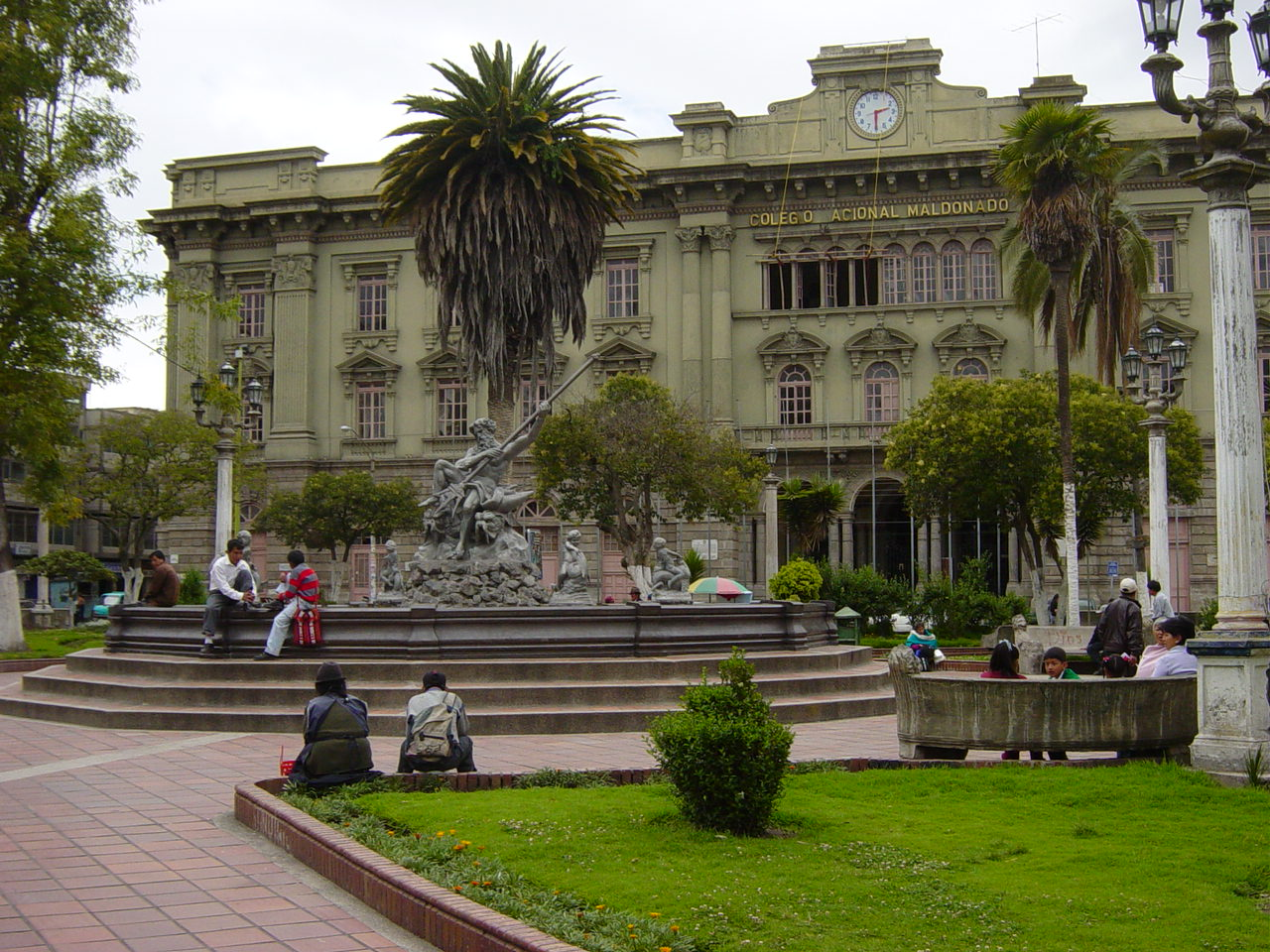
The Pedro Vicente Maldonado High School in Riobamba

- Pedro Vicente Maldonado canton in Pichincha Province, Ecuador is named for this scientist.
- The Colegio Nacional Maldonado was established in Riobamba In 1867 under president Jerónimo Carrión.
- Maldonado Walk, a lane sof Latin American shops and restaurants near Elephant and Castle in London is named after him.

== Sources ==
- Encyclopedia of Ecuador p. 755
- Sociedad Pedro Vicente Maldonado
- Maldonado Biography
- Ferreiro, Larrie: Measure of the Earth: The Enlightenment Expedition that Reshaped Our World (New York: Basic Books, 2011) ISBN 9780465017232
