= Pedro Vicente Maldonado Canton =

Coordinates: 0°10′N 79°0′W

- Canton
- Location of Pichincha Province in Ecuador

- Pedro Vicente Maldonado Canton in Pichincha Province
- Country: Ecuador
- Province: Pichincha Province

Area
  - Total: 618.4 km^{2} (238.8 sq mi)

Population (2022 census)
  - Total: 15,475
  - Density: 25.02/km^{2} (64.81/sq mi)

Pedro Vicente Maldonado is a canton in the west of the province of Pichincha in Ecuador. It is named after the 18th-century Ecuadoran scientist Pedro Vicente Maldonado. Arashá Spa, a tropical forest resort, is located in this canton.
