= Marco Ernesto =

Panamanian painter

- Born: Ernesto Marco Aníbal Gomezjurado Solórzano; 17 October 1923; Panama City, Panama
- Died: 26 November 1985 (aged 62); Panama City, Panama
- Known for: Painter
- Style: Palette knife Post-impressionist
- Movement: Post-Impressionism
- Spouse: Gertrudis Montenegro (m. 1959)

Ernesto Marco Aníbal Gomezjurado Solórzano (17 October 1923 - 26 November 1985) better known as Marco Ernesto, was an impressionist Panamanian painter, called "The Palette Knife Master".

== Biography ==
Firstborn son of Ecuadorian artist Enrique Gomezjurado and Rosario Solórzano Freire. Marco Ernesto born in Panama City on October 17, 1923, baptized as Ernesto Marco Aníbal, reversed the order of his first two names to form his stage name "Marco Ernesto" with which he is known.

He traveled and exhibited in several Latin American countries, achieving popularity, he developed with great skill the palette knife technique post-impressionist, so he became known as a painter master in that technique. He was also a skilled watercolorist.

His works are in private collections inside and outside Panama, as well as in museums and banks, he has the merit of founding the first art school in David, Chiriquí.

== Early life ==
His parents arrived in Panama in 1922, where his father was hired for several artistic works, the design of capitals in theaters and churches, the project was extended and would make them remain in Panama for almost 7 years. In that period, Ernesto (Marco Ernesto) and his brothers Gustavo and Alicia were born in Panama. From his childhood Ernesto was a student of his father, cultivating drawing and studying color. His sister Alicia Gomezjurado also as a student of her father, became an artist years later.

He was educated at the Republic of Chile school and finally in 1930, when Marco Ernesto was 6 years old, the family returned to Ecuador, settling in the capital, where his father was appointed professor of the School of Fine Arts of Quito.

Between 1936 and 1937, Marco Ernesto entered the School of Fine Arts of Quito, where his father was a teacher, once that stage ended, he made his first exhibitions and traveled to Colombia, where he made his first major exhibition of relevance, in Bogotá in 1942. In 1947, fulfilling a personal wish, he traveled to Panama, his country of birth, later moved to Venezuela and exhibited successfully in Caracas and other cities.

He continued traveling and exhibiting in different Latin American countries such as Costa Rica, Ecuador and Venezuela, studied the colors of places he visited to create paintings in different styles, while perfecting his post-impressionist knife palette technique, which he would develop throughout his life.

== Work ==
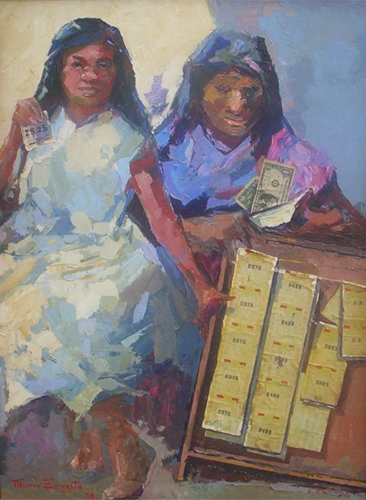
El pedacito premiado (1978) INAC collection. National Institute of Culture.

In 1949, he returned to Panama from Costa Rica, the following year, invited by important boqueteñas ladies, he arrived in Chiriquí. In 1950 he won the third prize Ricardo Miró and in 1955 the second place in the same contest. In David he founded the first Art School in June 1956, years later he moved to Boquete, and met Doña Gertrudis Montenegro, with whom he married in 1959. He established his residence in Boquete and began one of his most prolific stages of his work.

He exhibited in the Panama Canal Zone, where civil and military authorities acquired numerous works of his. In Boquete, inspired by its paradisiacal beauty, he painted landscapes, traditional scenes, still lifes, coffee plantations, farmers and landscapes with the Barú Volcano, he made several murals for different institutions in Panama.

Between 1955 and 1956, hired by Máximo Yen, he painted his two well-known murals for the "Yen Bar", currently "Boquete Bistro". Marco Ernesto thought about a marine theme, but Yen leaned towards a landscape typical of the region, taking Marco Ernesto around, the artist finally decided on the mountain range and painted Coffee Trees Harvest and Orange Harvest.

His increasingly personal style, solving the volume and perspective by applying thick fillings directly on the canvas with great mastery, would make him go into the history of art in his country as "The Palette Knife Master", he was an innovator in this technique. In Boquete they are preserved Murals in restaurants and hotels. In David, in the Grand National Hotel, there are the two large murals; Coffee Harvest and Cattle Rodeo.

In 1961 he exhibited in Brazil and continued exhibiting in different places. Marco Ernesto continued painting almost until the end of his life. The artist died while he slept on November 26, 1985 in Panama City., buried in the Boquete Cemetery.

== Gallery ==
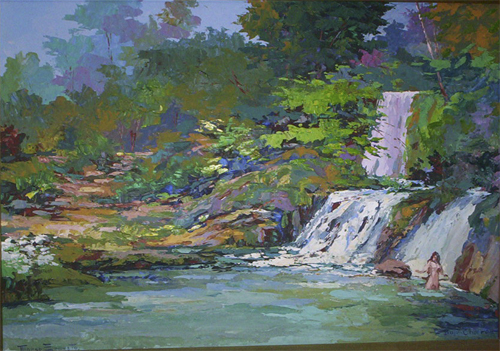
Bath in the river, former bookstore Exedra Books collection.

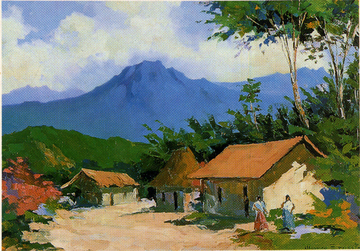
Barú landscape, from the cover of the book "Fugitive Landscape" by the writer Jorge Thomas, pseudonym of Juan David Morgan, private collection of the same writer.
