= Palacio de Carondelet =

Seat of government of Ecuador

Carondelet Palace
- Palacio de Carondelet
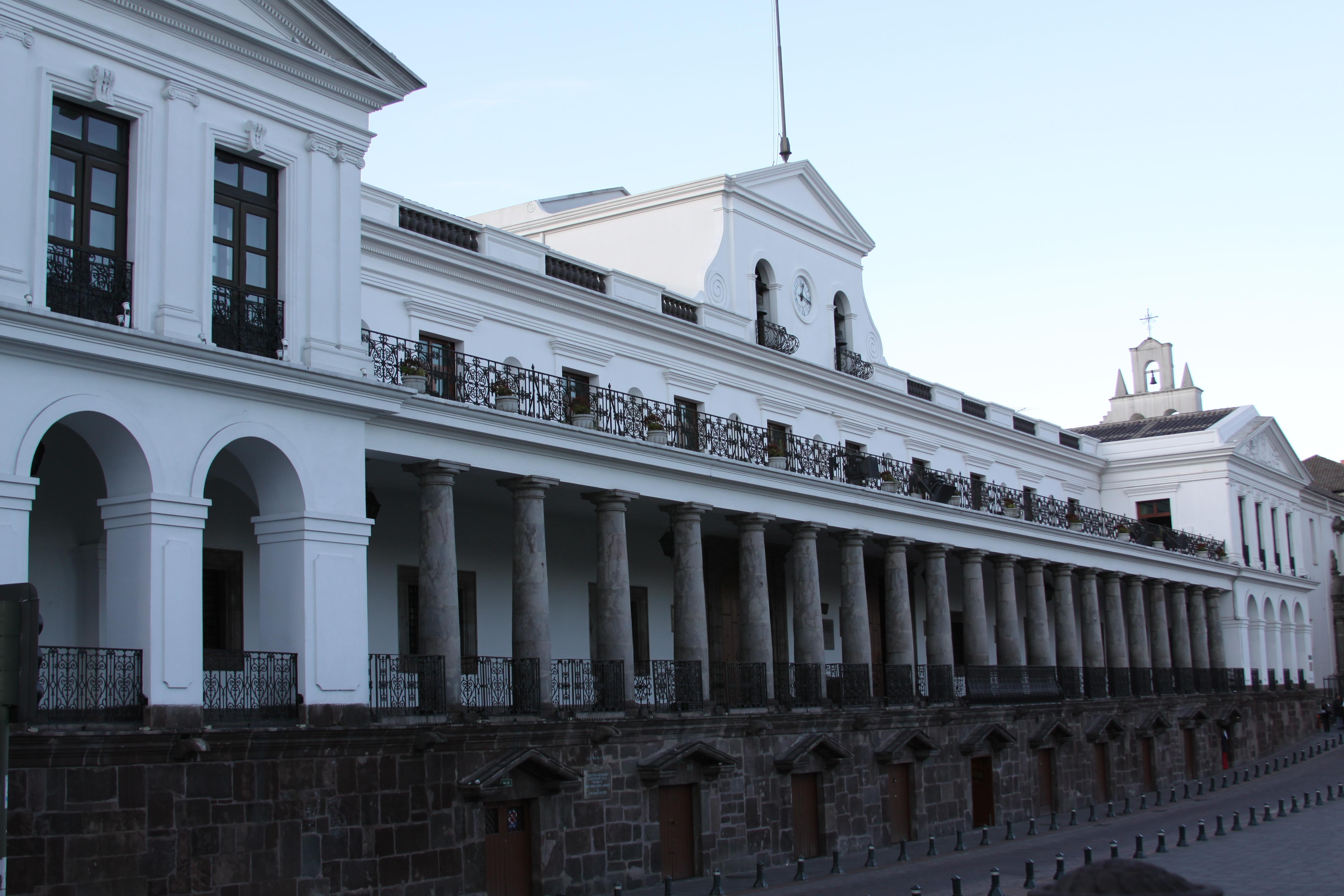
- Interactive map of the Carondelet Palace area

General information
- Type: Palace
- Architectural style: Spanish baroque
- Location: Quito, Ecuador, García Moreno St. and Chile Rd.
- Coordinates: 0°13′11″S 78°30′45″W
- Elevation: 2,820 m (9,252 ft)
- Current tenants: President of Ecuador
- Construction started: 1790
- Completed: 1801
- Client: Barón Francisco Luis Héctor de Carondelet
- Owner: Ecuadorian government

Design and construction
- Designations

UNESCO World Heritage Site
- Type: Cultural
- Criteria: ii, iv
- Designated: 1978
- Part of: City of Quito
- Reference no.: 2
- Region: Latin America and the Caribbean

Carondelet Palace (Spanish: Palacio de Carondelet) is the seat of government of the Republic of Ecuador, located in Quito. Access is by the public space known as Independence Square or Plaza Grande (colloquial name), around which are also the Archbishop's Palace, Municipal Palace, Hotel Plaza Grande, and Metropolitan Cathedral.

== History ==
The history of this emblematic building dates back to colonial times, around 1570, with the acquisition of the former royal houses located in the city of Quito.

=== First royal houses ===
The first seat of the Spanish Crown in the Royal Audience of Quito functioned near the convent of La Merced (current Cuenca and Chile streets). After Diego Suarez de Figueroa, secretary of the audience, died in 1611, the government took over his small palace, built in the central square (Plaza Grande).

Juan Fernandez de Recalde, president of the Audience, informed the king that the building was available. It was purchased by the Crown as a larger building to house the Spanish administration in Quito.

Some time later, Recalde's successor, President Antonio de Morga, informed the king that the royal houses needed to be replaced, as they were very old. He proposed buying the adjacent houses. The earthquake of 1627 caused damage and the government was forced to buy the neighboring buildings to restore them. They were rebuilt in stone and brick. Thereafter, the seat of the audience was settled in the front of the Plaza Grande.

=== New palace ===
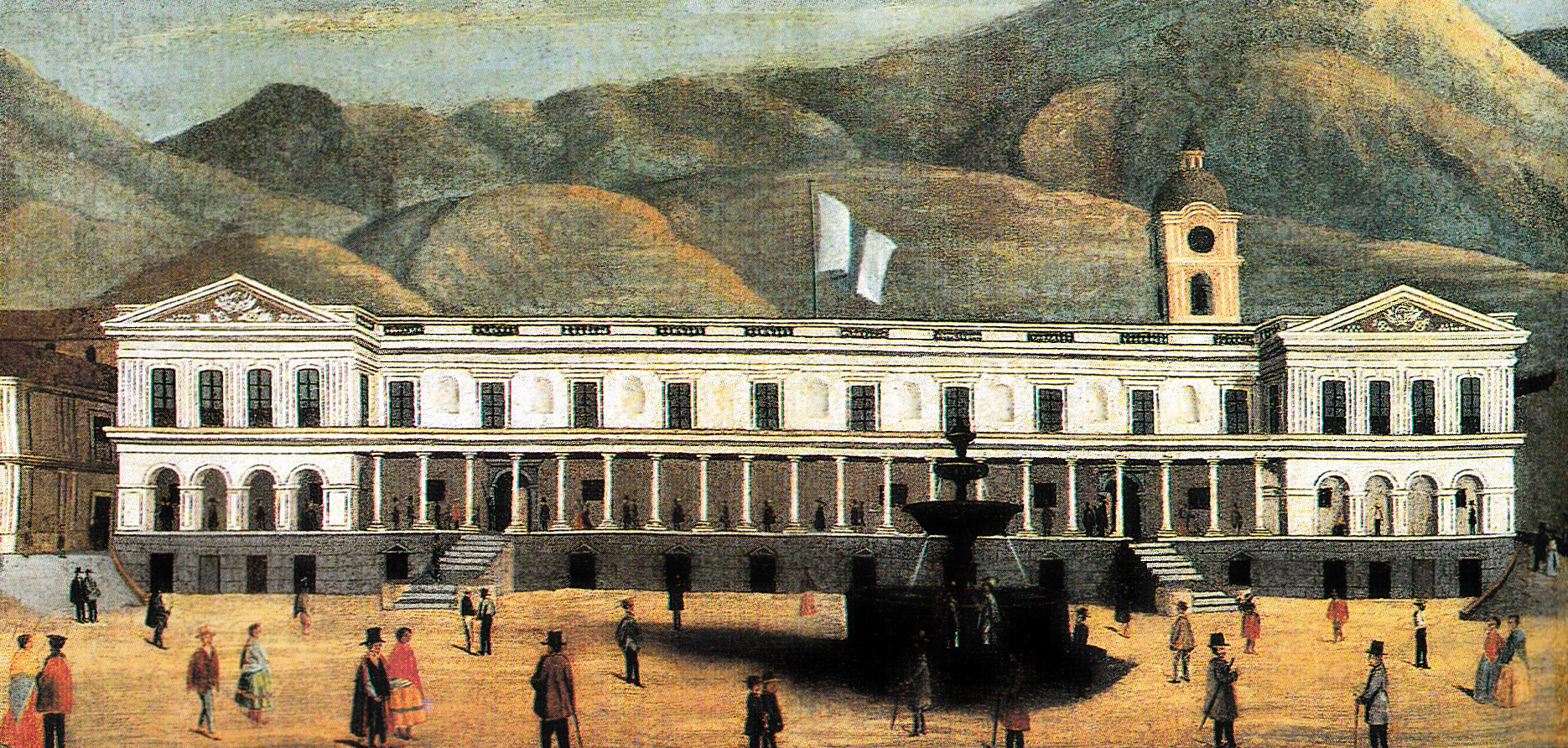
Carondelet Palace during the mid-19th century after the March Revolution. Oil painting by Rafael Salas.

In 1799, the Barón Francisco Luis Héctor de Carondelet was appointed chairman of the Audience. In 1801, the Spanish hired Antonio Garcia, to perform the work of rehabilitation and improvements, both of the Audience Palace and the cathedral. He also led the work on the arches of the sewers and the renovation of the Prison building.

After the independence of Ecuador ended with the Battle of Pichincha in 1822, the palace became the headquarters of the South Department of Gran Colombia, welcoming the liberator Simón Bolívar sometimes. He wondered at the elegance and austerity of the building and was delighted with the taste of the Baron of Carondelet (main person in charge of the work); thus, Bolivar gave the building the name of Carondelet Palace.

=== Republican era ===
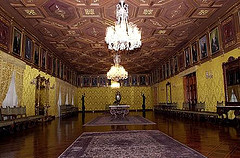
The Yellow Hall or President's Hall.

During the Republican era, almost all the presidents (constitutional, internees and dictators) have worked in this building, which is the seat of Government of the Republic of Ecuador.

There have been some changes over the years, the most important in the presidencies of Gabriel García Moreno, Camilo Ponce Enríquez and Sixto Durán Ballén.

Besides the administrative offices in the third level of the Palace, there is the presidential residence, a luxurious colonial-style apartment in which the President and his family live.

Currently, the Presidency and Vice Presidency of the Republic and the Ministry of the Interior, occupy the Complex of Carondelet, which includes the buildings of the former Post Office (presently on Benalcázar street, between Chile and Espejo) and the Government Palace, separated by the garage.

== Opening to the public ==
During the presidency of Rafael Correa, the Ecuadorian government declared the Carondelet Palace and its agencies an Ecuadorian cultural heritage, and transformed the presidential compound into a museum open to the public.

Designated areas were organized to house objects within their cultural contexts, allotting several rooms and spaces within the palace, so as to make them publicly accessible.

To carry out this work, Maria del Carmen Molestina, researcher, PhD in Archaeology, and former director of the Museum of the Central Bank of Ecuador, catalogued objects and identified places to exhibit the gifts that the president has received while in office. Furthermore, she located objects and antique furniture with cultural value from within the palace to be placed in the exhibition gallery.

Under this system, it is now possible to acknowledge the cultural, historical and/or ethnographic value to presidential gifts and to identify all objects that represent and embody customs, traditions, ideologies, and forms of thinking of different Ecuadorian ethnic groups. Under the presidency of Lenin Moreno, the museum to the public was closed.

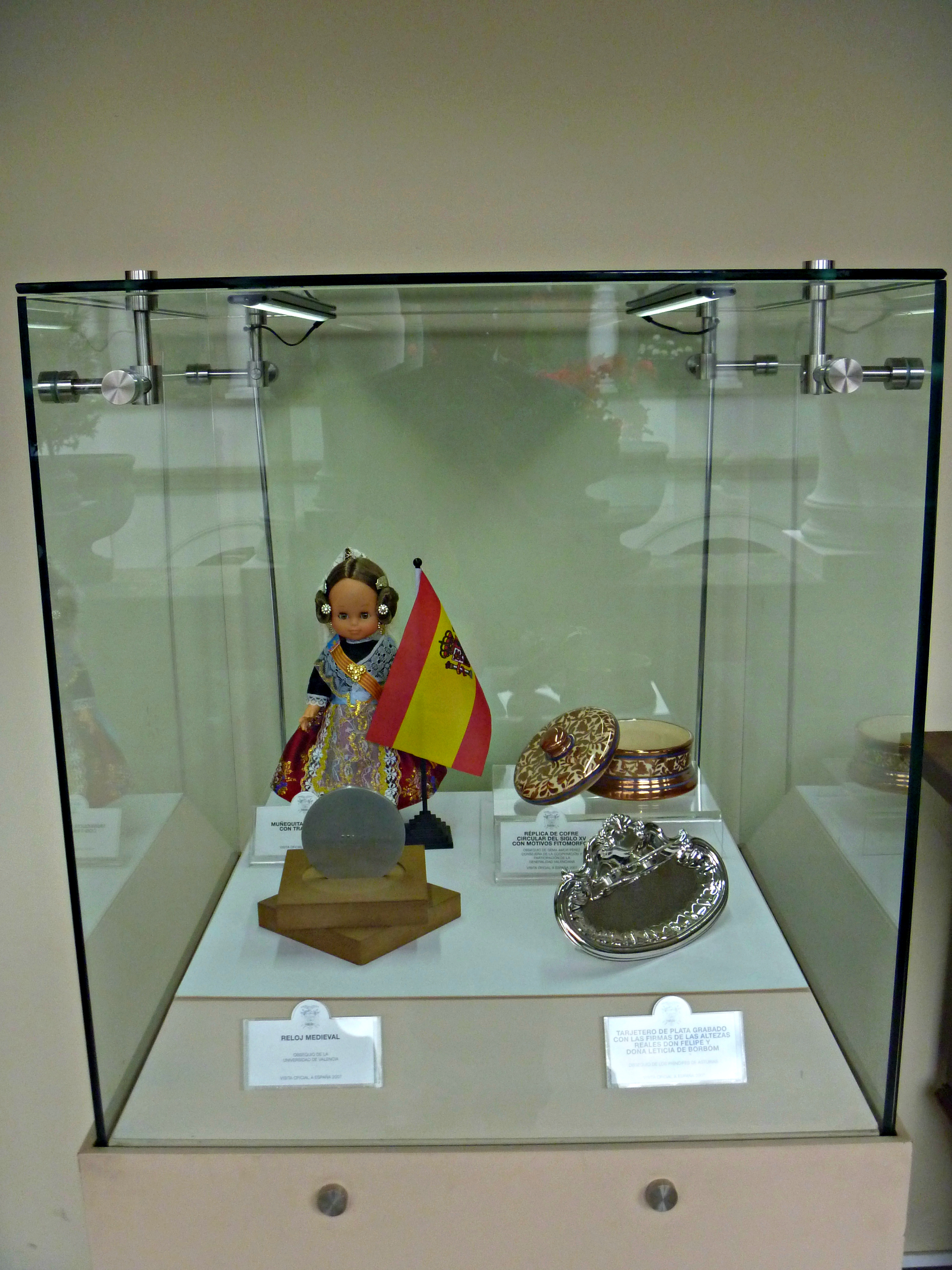
Prince of Asturias Display. Gifts presented to the president by heirs to the Spanish throne, Felipe y Letizia, during their visit to Quito in 2012.

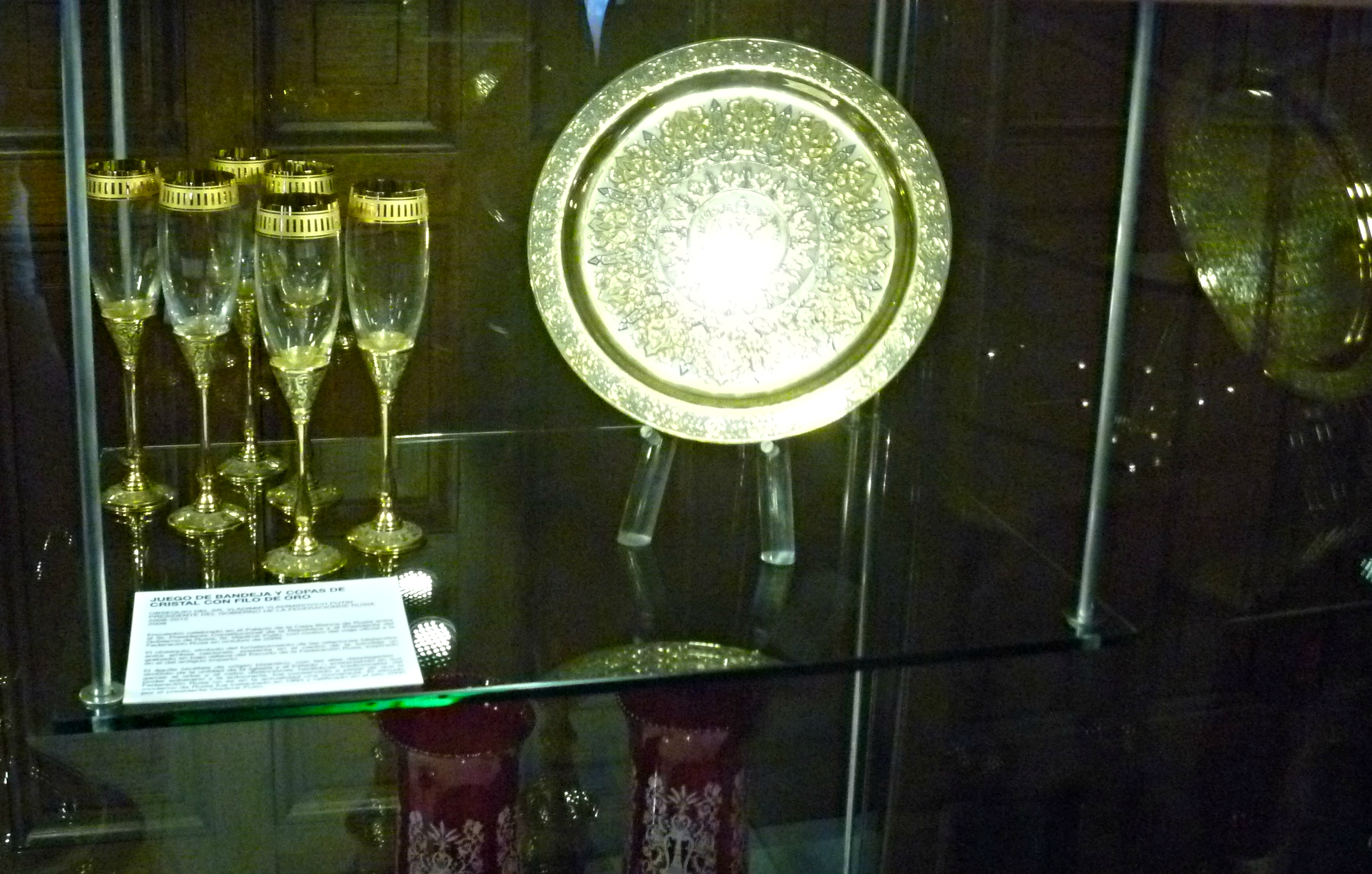
Europe Display. In the image: cups and golden dish, gifts from the Russian government in 2010.

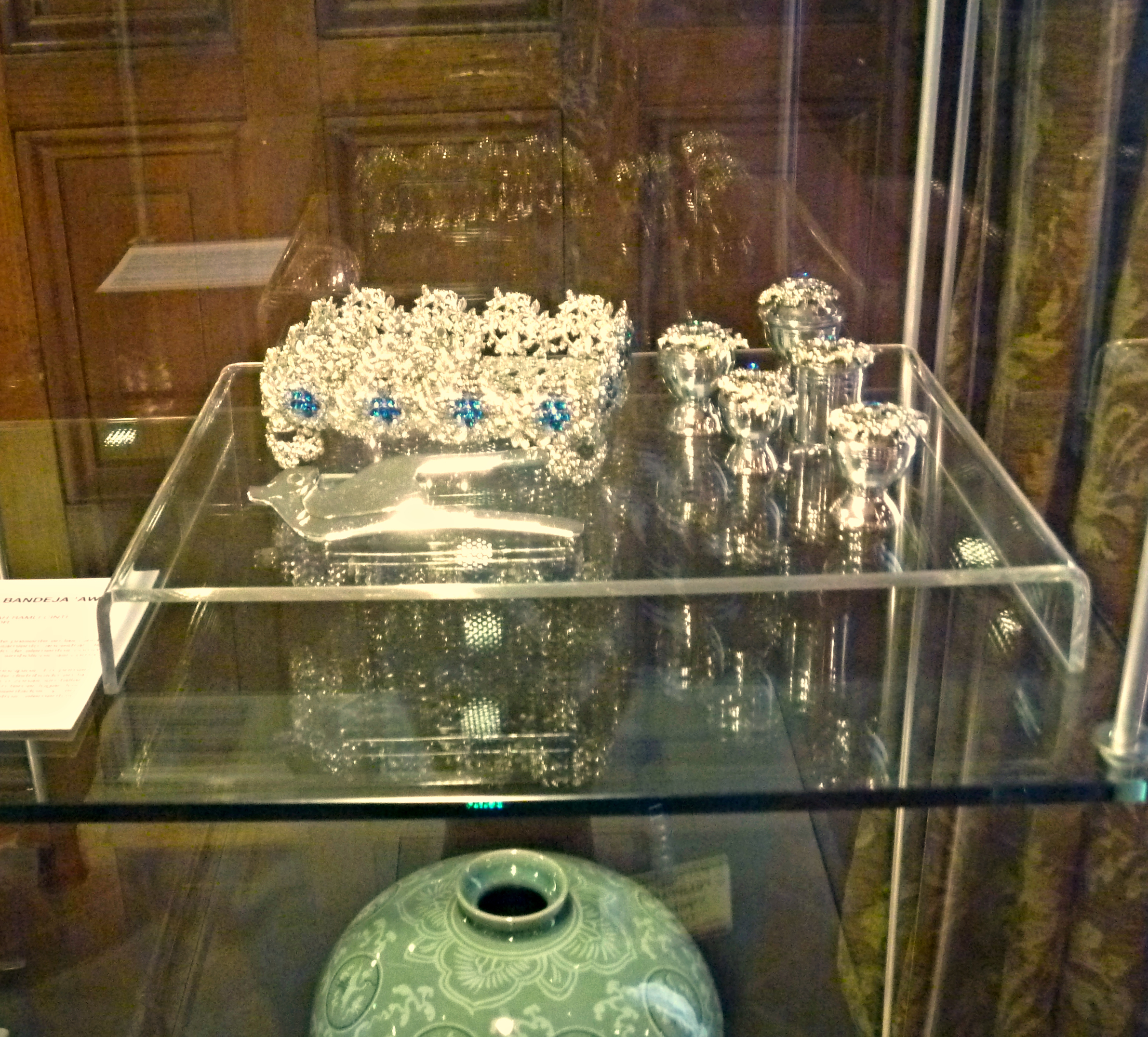
Asia Display. Tiara and silver cups, gifts from the government of Iran.

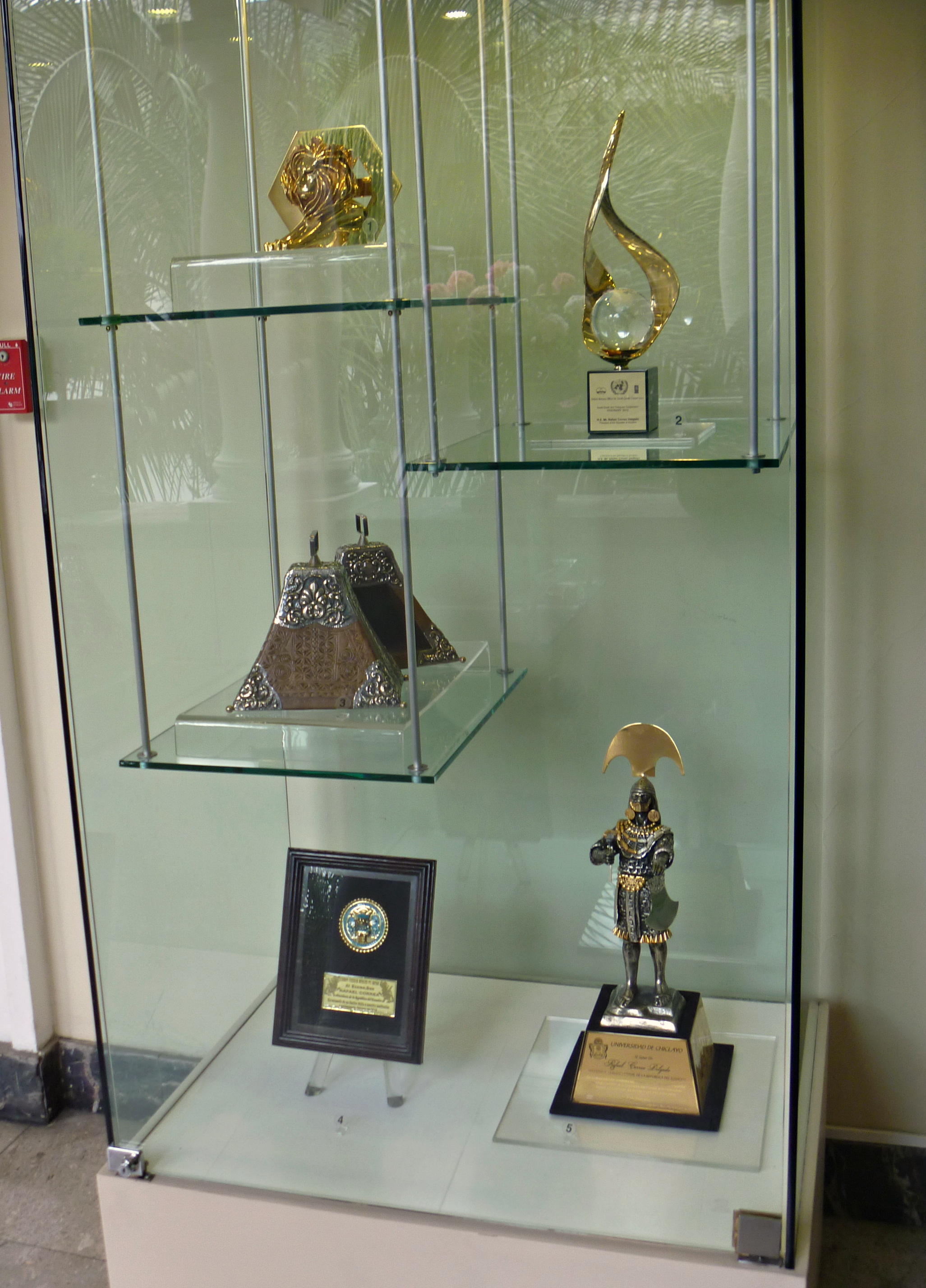
America Display. Gifts from the government of Perú and international prizes for the Yasuní ITT initiative.

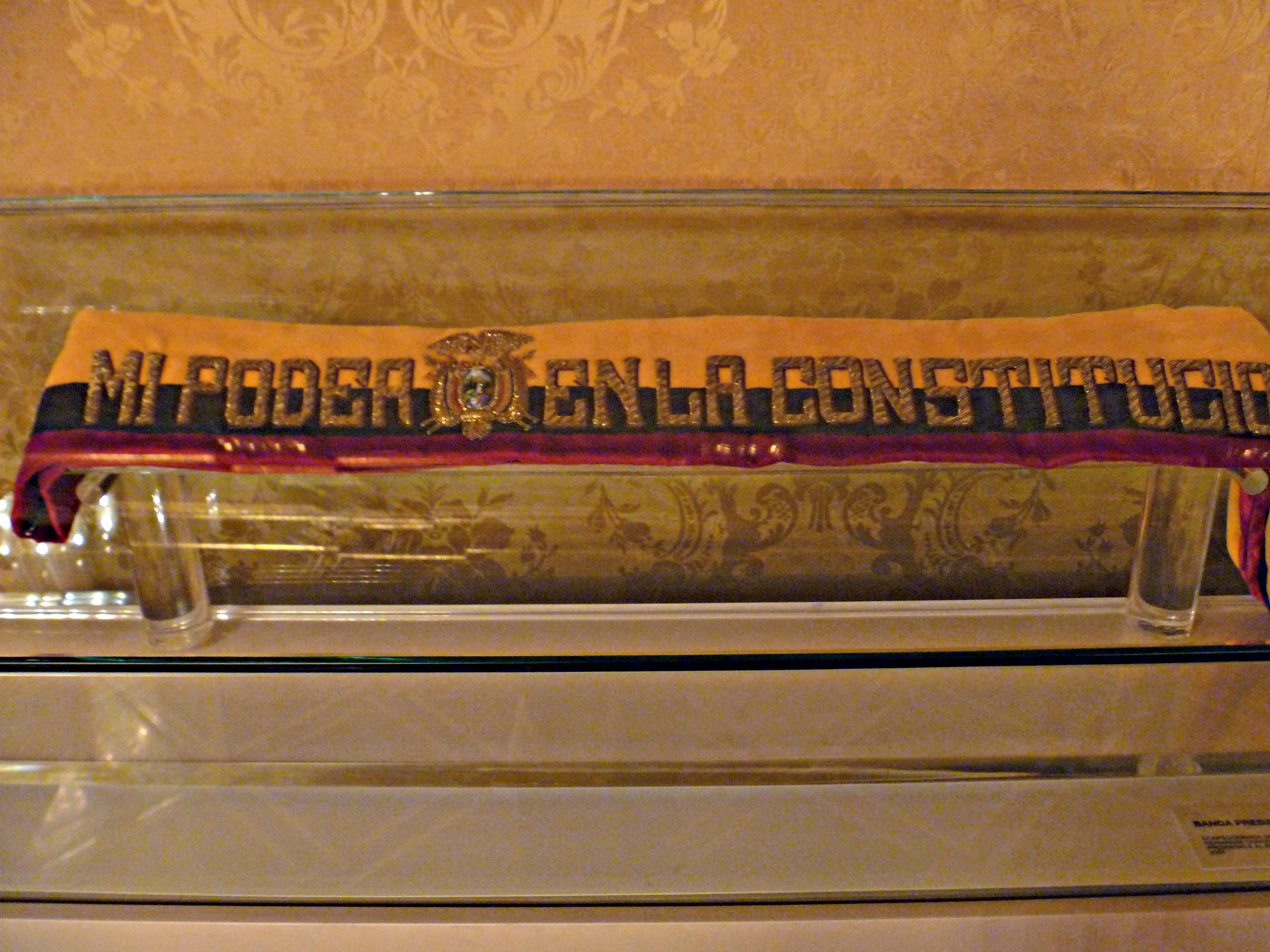
Presidential sash with which Rafael Correa invested as President of the Republic.

== Plunder of the palace ==
According to the researcher, María del Carmen Molestina, it is amazing how, over the years, the Carondelet Palace has been looted. Most of the furniture and items in the interior that can be seen today are new; even some of the bronze fittings from the furniture dating for the time of Garcia Moreno have been replaced by copies of gold-sprayed lead.

The investigation, which Molestina is currently conducting, is directed at when the so-called looting began. The Carondelet Palace was restored during the presidency of Camilo Ponce Enriquez (1956–1960) and until the presidency of León Febres Cordero (1984–1988), all was as it should have been. From that period there is no information about the fate of much of the belongings of the Presidential Palace.

Additionally, Molestina believes that everything was kept until the presidency of Rodrigo Borja (1988–1992) after which Sixto Durán Ballén (1992–1996) ordered a new presidential suite on the third floor of the palace.

== See also ==
- List of buildings in Quito
