= Palace of Pizarro, Quito =

Hotel in Quito, Ecuador

Hotel Plaza Grande

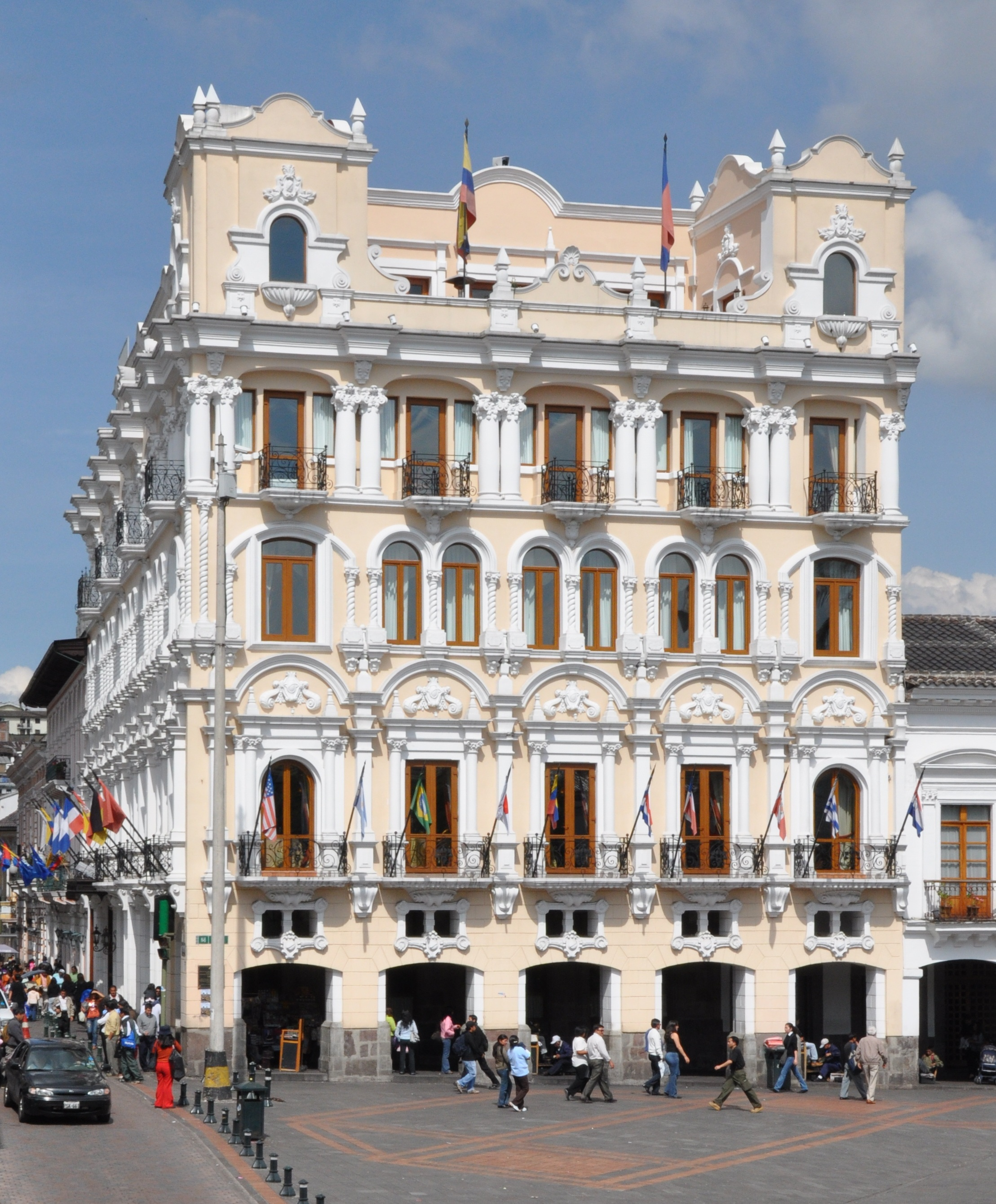

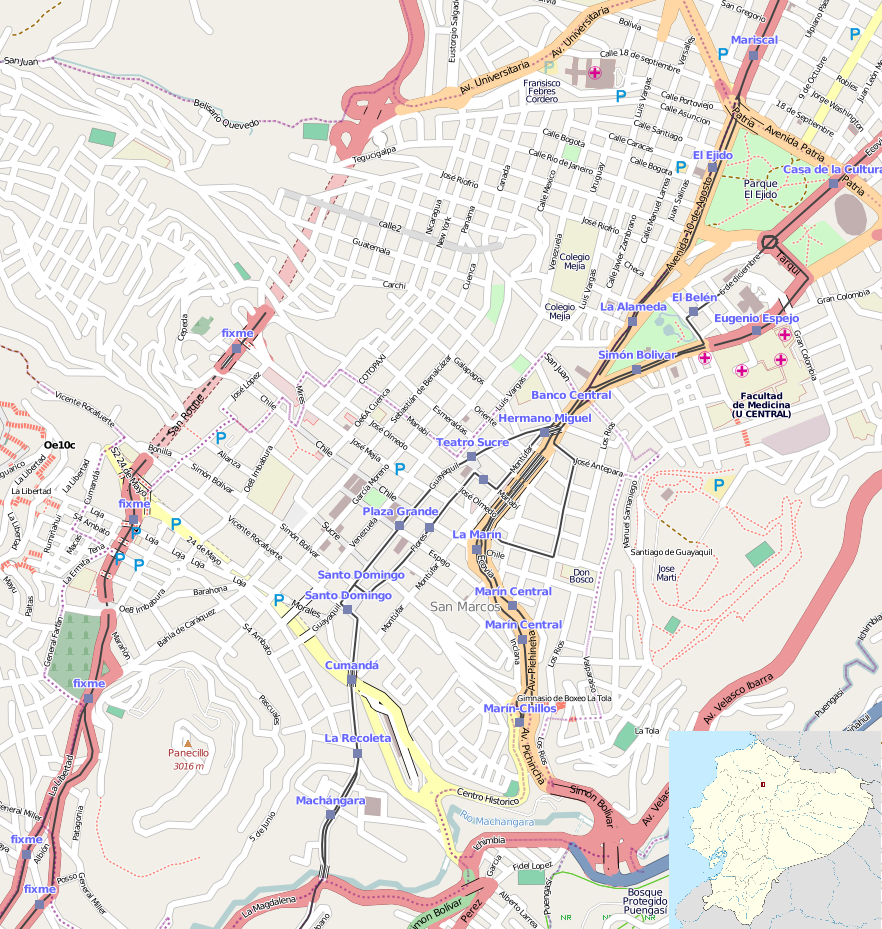
- Location in the Old Centre of Quito

General information
- Location: Quito, Ecuador
- Coordinates: 0°13′10″S 78°30′43″W
- Opening: 1943; 2005

Other information
- Number of suites: 15
- Number of restaurants: 2

Hotel Plaza Grande is a five-star luxury hotel in the historic centre of Quito, Ecuador. The hotel is located next to the Carondelet Palace and the Archbishop's Palace and faces the Old Town's eponymous central plaza, Plaza de la Independencia. It is located in a restored Spanish colonial mansion, which formerly belonged to one of the earliest colonial inhabitants of Quito, Juan Diaz de Hidalgo.

== History ==
The place where the building stands today was assigned during the first plot of land in the city in 1534, a few days after the founding of the city of San Francisco de Quito, to the conquistador Francisco Pizarro, who never got to inhabit it because he resided in the city of Lima. However, the two-story mansion that was built on the site was inhabited by his brother Gonzalo Pizarro and even his daughter Francisca Pizarro Yupanqui when she traveled with her mother, Inca Princess Quispe Sisa, to Spain to meet with the King in 1551. At the end of the 16th century, the Pizarros donated the house to the Mercedarian order, which would later divide the plot into various properties until the houses that currently occupy the original land were configured.

The building underwent several changes over the next three centuries, including its characteristic Eclectic-style exterior ornamentation made by the Italian architect Antonino Russo, that draws so much attention within the set of historical structures that frame the most important square in the city of Quito, whose common denominator is rather the austerity of the Neoclassical.

It was the first building in Quito to be more than two storeys at five, when it was built in 1930. It was one of the first formal hotels in Quito, originally becoming the Majestic Hotel in 1943. As of 1986 it was still the Majestic Hotel, but it later closed and became a bank and then as administrative offices for the municipality of Quito. In 1978, this Old Town area became one of the first UNESCO "World Heritage Site", and is the largest site in Latin America. In 2005 a group of hoteliers provided investment to restore the building to its former glory.

== Architecture and furnishings ==
The building is noted for its "eclectic facade and baroque columns". The interior has been described as "exclusive, elegant and even decadent throughout and truly boutique". The hotel is very expensive; rooms are available for $500-$2000 a night. It contains 15 suites, which are divided into Plaza View and Royal suites and its one Presidential Suite is the most expensive.

On the ground floor is the reception and the hotel cafe, popular with businessman and officials, which serves international and Ecuadorian cuisine. On the first floor is the hotel's flagship La Belle époque restaurant which serves French cuisine and international dishes. Set in a lavish room inspired by the Art Nouveau style, the restaurant stocks over 1,500 bottles of wine.

The suites are located on the second and third floors. The rooms are all of considerable size and luxurious. Frommer's describes the decor as "refined, with heavy drapes, plush furnishings, fine fabrics, and tasteful art and tapestries on the walls." In the rooms are rich furnishings, containing colonial closets, desks, mirrors and artwork which recreate the old colonial world atmosphere and also contain 42" flat screen televisions. The beds are described as "huge, embellished with Egyptian cotton sheets and fluffed up goose–down pillows." The bathrooms are also large, and feature Jacuzzi–shower tubs and luxury robes. The bathrooms are even finer in the Plaza View suites, with marble and wood washbasins. On the top floor is the champagne bar and cognac bar, which have a terrace between them.

== See also ==
- List of buildings in Quito
