= Arashá Spa =

Tropical forest health resort and spa

Arashá Spa is a tropical forest health resort and spa, located about 3 kilometres west of the town of Pedro Vicente Maldonado near La Independencia, Pichincha Province, in northern Ecuador. It is noted for its chocolate fondue treatments and workshops. Set in the heart of the forest, it is an ecological hot spot, with over 1,500 endemic plant species and one of the largest varieties of amphibians in the world.

In 2016, the resort honored as leading resort of Ecuador by World Travel Awards — the travel industry's most prestigious awards programme, rewarding leaders in the tourism, airline, hotel and hospitality sectors.
