= Madre Tierra Resort and Spa =

Coordinates: 4.24670°S 79.22577°W

Madre Tierra Resort and Spa' is an eco-resort and spa, located about 2 kilometers north of the town of Vilcabamba (meaning "Sacred Valley") in 29 km from the center of Loja, Loja Province, in Southern Ecuador. Also, it's located in 34 km from Camilo Ponce Enriquez Airport. It is noted for its meticulously decorated rooms while being located on a hillside with waterfalls and gardens.

In 2016, the resort received Tripadvisor's Certificate of Excellence.
