= Alberto Mena Caamaño Museum =

Museum in Quito, Ecuador

Coordinates: 0.2198662°S 78.5131179°W

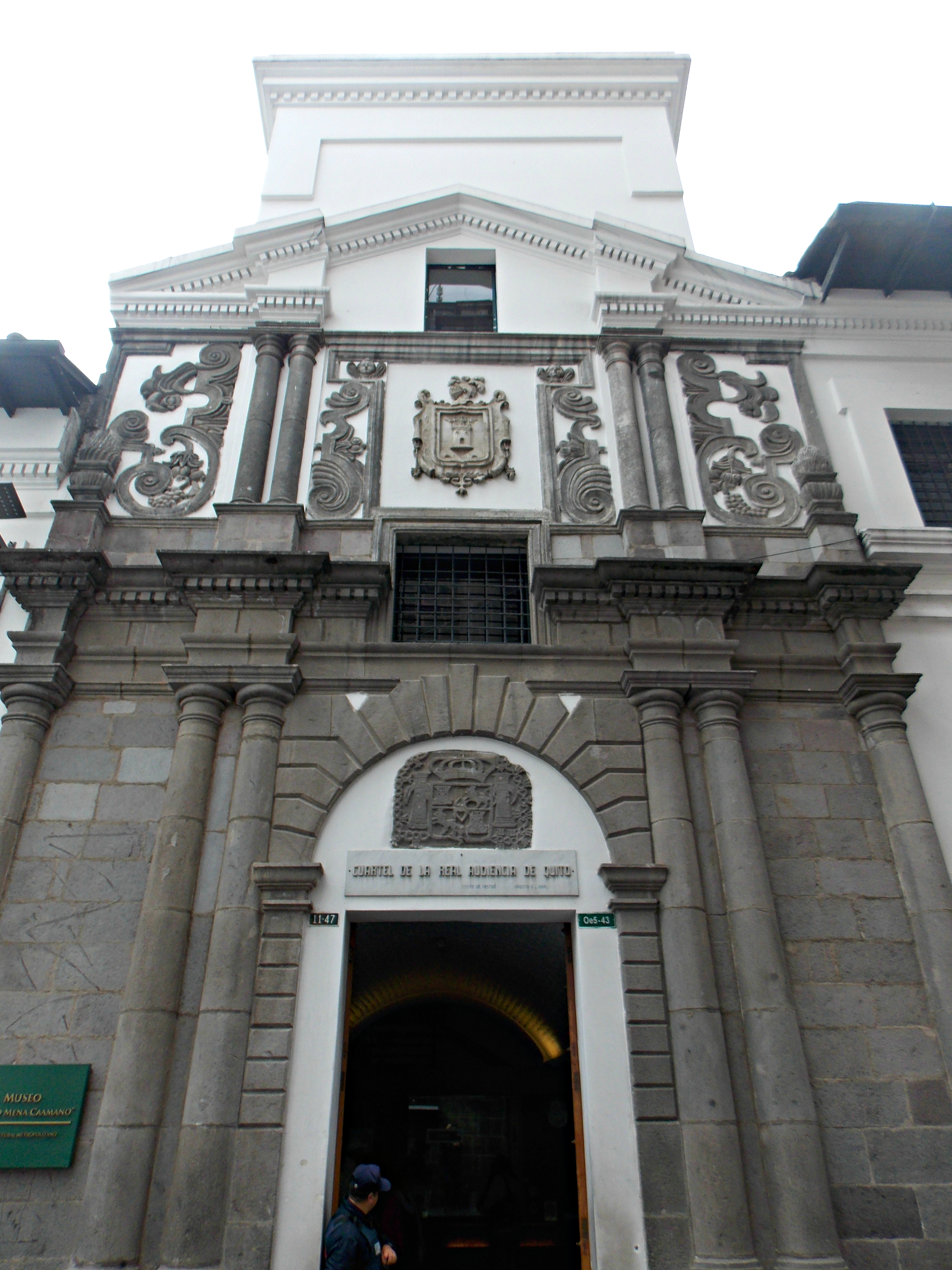
Alberto Mena Caamaño Museum

Alberto Mena Caamaño Museum (Spanish: Museo Alberto Mena Caamaño) is a museum in Quito, Ecuador. A cultural institution of Quito, the capital of Ecuador, it is located in the historic center of the city, next to the Palacio de Carondelet. The Rough Guide to Ecuador considers it to be the "old town's most rewarding museum".

It was created by ordinance on May 28, 1957, following a donation from the aristocratic philanthropist Alberto Mena Caamaño. The donation included more than 600 objects including paintings, sculptures, archaeological pieces, weapons and miscellaneous items. After a restoration of the former Royal Barracks building, the museum opened to the public on November 3, 1959. In 1970 a permanent exhibition hall was added on a theme of the slaughter which occurred on August 2, 1810, when 200 citizens were killed in the barracks and the surrounding streets of Quito by royalist troops. It is depicted by wax figures of the artist Francisco Barbieri. In 1987 the museum had to close its doors due to minor damage to the building structure, as a result of the earthquakes that rocked Quito that year. Finally, on November 27, 2002, it reopened following extensive restoration.
