= Iglesia de El Sagrario, Quito =

Catholic church in Quito, Ecuador

Coordinates: 0.2207°S 78.5128°W

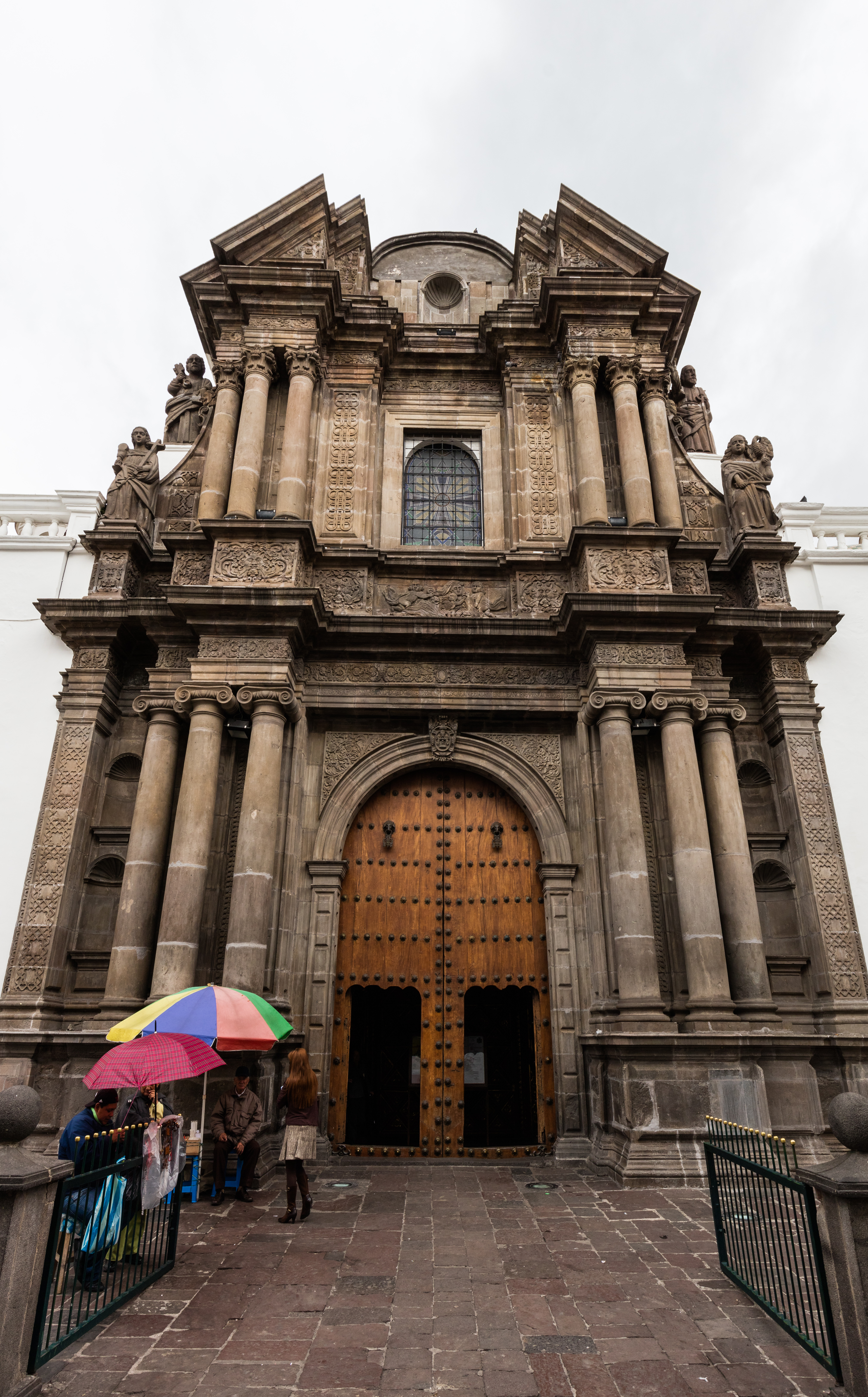
Main Portal of the Church of El Sagrario

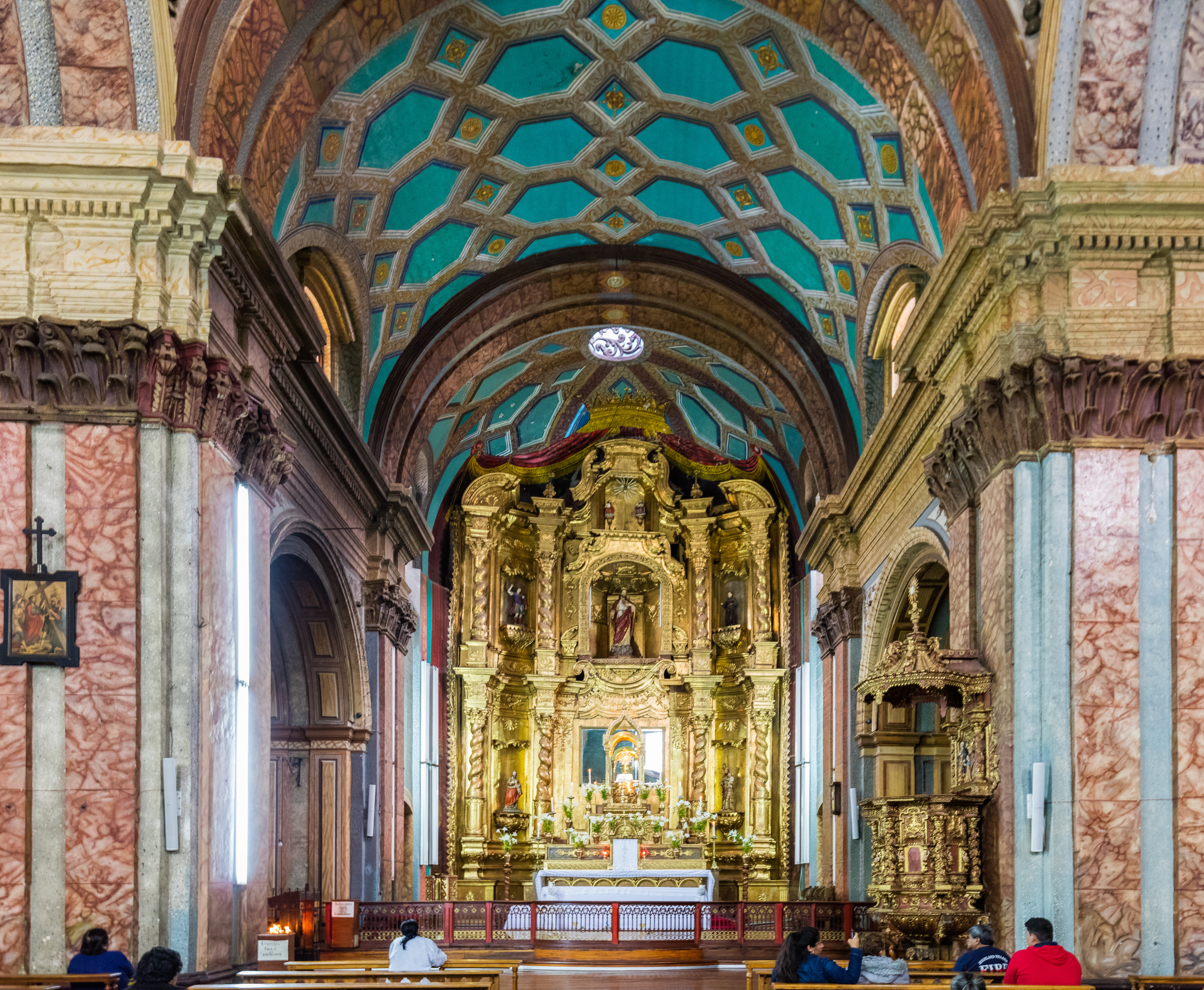
High altar of La Iglesia de El Sagrario

La Iglesia de El Sagrario (Spanish, 'Church of the Sanctuary' or 'Church of the Shrine') is a Renaissance Catholic Church in the city of Quito, capital of Ecuador. It is located in the Historic Center of the city, on calle García Moreno, formerly known as calle de las Siete Cruces, a few meters from the corner with calle Eugenio Espejo. It is part of the Metropolitan Cathedral complex, although it seems more like an independent church than an adjoining chapel, both because of its size and because of its importance in Quito's art.

== Origin ==
The origin of the religious dedication of this church is that all of its kind (that is, the churches called by the name of Sagrario) are sacramental chapels or sanctuaries of a great cathedral to which they are attached, fulfilling at the same time, and by themselves, the function of parishes of the urban district that surrounds the cathedral. This type of sacramental chapel, really conceived as a temple annexed to a larger one, sharing a façade with the cathedral itself and at the same time having functions as an independent parish, has its origin in the Cathedral of Seville, and from there the model was extended to the cathedrals that the Spanish built in the New World.

== History ==
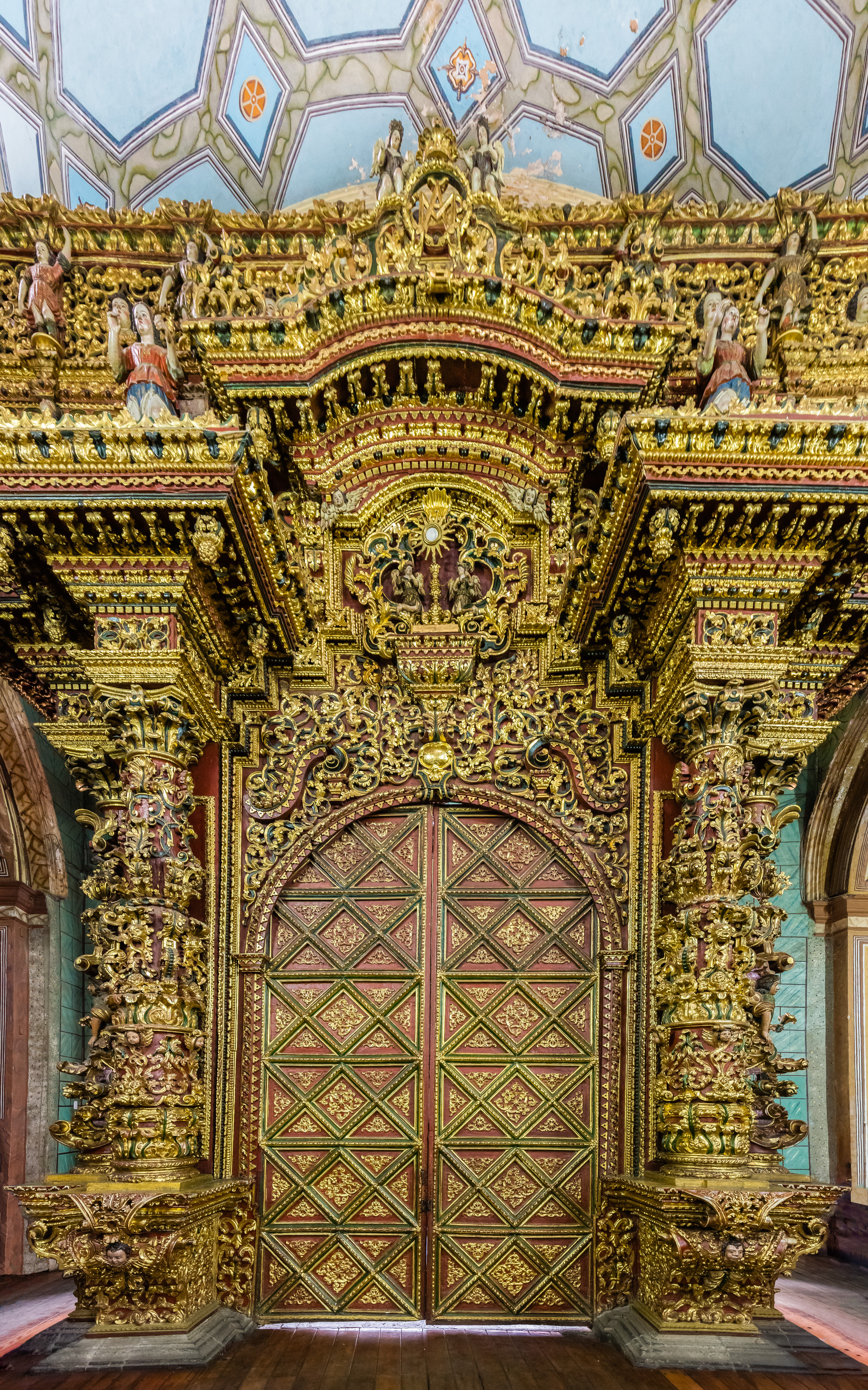
Interior main gate

The construction of this building took place in the period between the 17th and 18th centuries, thanks to the contribution of the Confraternity of the Sagrado Sacramento, which began with the foundation work in 1617. The church was built on an arcade that closed the old Zanguña ravine, adjacent to the cathedral and that extended from the monastery of El Tejar sector to the west of the colonial city, to the area currently known as La Marín; these foundation works were directed by the Jesuit priest of Neapolitan origin, Marcos Guerra, and have a depth of fourteen meters on the south side and three meters on the north side, since they follow the level of decline that the aforementioned ravine presented.

On November 4, 1694, the architect José Jaime Ortiz arrived in Quito, from Alicante (Spain), who signed the contract for the construction of the building, which was planned according to the Italian Renaissance style that was fashionable at the time. The Ecuadorian writer Julio Pazos Barrera describes the temple as follows:

The central nave ends with a barrel vault and the two lateral ones are closed with small domes. In the transept and on the pendentives there is a tholobate and on this a semicircular with its lantern. The interiors of these structures feature paintings of angels and saints by the brush of Francisco Albán. The facade of the temple, with two bodies, alternates the Ionic order in the first and the Corinthian in the second. On each side of the central street there are sets of three tall columns that give a total of twelve. Four robust stone sculptures adorn the second body

The façade was completed in 1706 by Gabriel de Escorza, while the rest of the construction was completed in 1715, and between 1731 and 1747 the altarpieces inside the temple were finished. The frontispiece was worked under the direction of Gabriel de Escorza Escalante, with the same Neoclassical arrangement that had presided over his work in the Church of San Agustín a few years ago.

== Interior decoration ==
The interior main gate, the work of Bernardo de Legarda, is considered one of the richest manifestations of Quitoan Baroque, which Pazos Barrera describes as "a fabulous wood carving from the beginning of the 18th century. In it, the columns have given way to plant forms that culminate in capricious capitals and cornices. It reproduces, on the interior side, the symbols of the main altar". The central vault, whose dome was decorated with frescoes that reproduce scenes from the Bible, was also commissioned to master Legarda in 1742, who assigned the painter Francisco Albán for that work.

The altarpieces, including the main altar, were made by Bernardo de Legarda and gilded by Cristóbal Gualoto, who was at the head of a team of five officers. Among the smaller altarpieces, the one of Nuestra Señora del Sagrado Corazón stands out, which has two superimposed bodies with wound columns and niches; while in another of the altarpieces of the Nave del Evangelio there is a set attributed to the famous Cuenca sculptor Gaspar Sangurima.

== Gallery ==
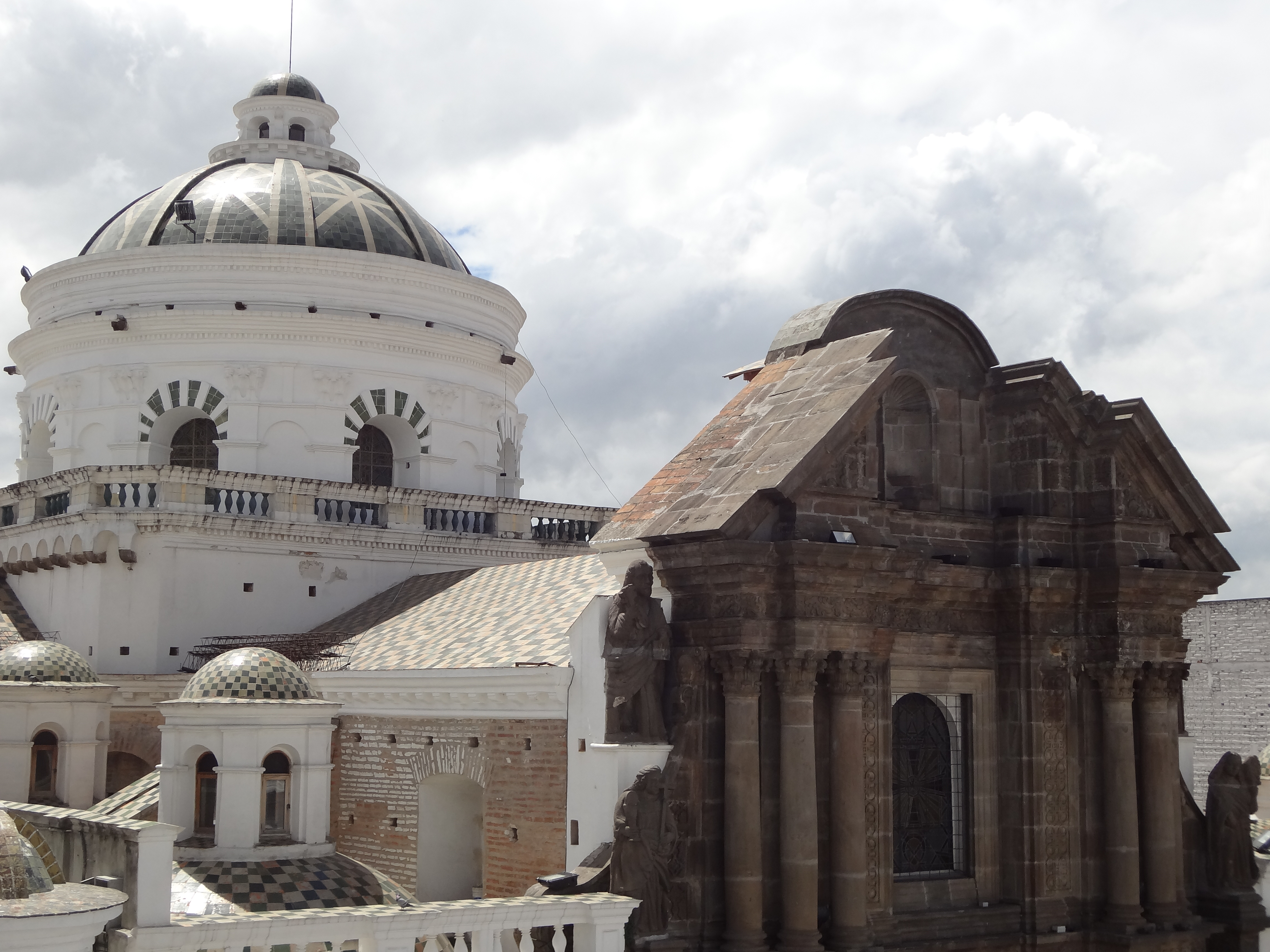
The dome and lanterns

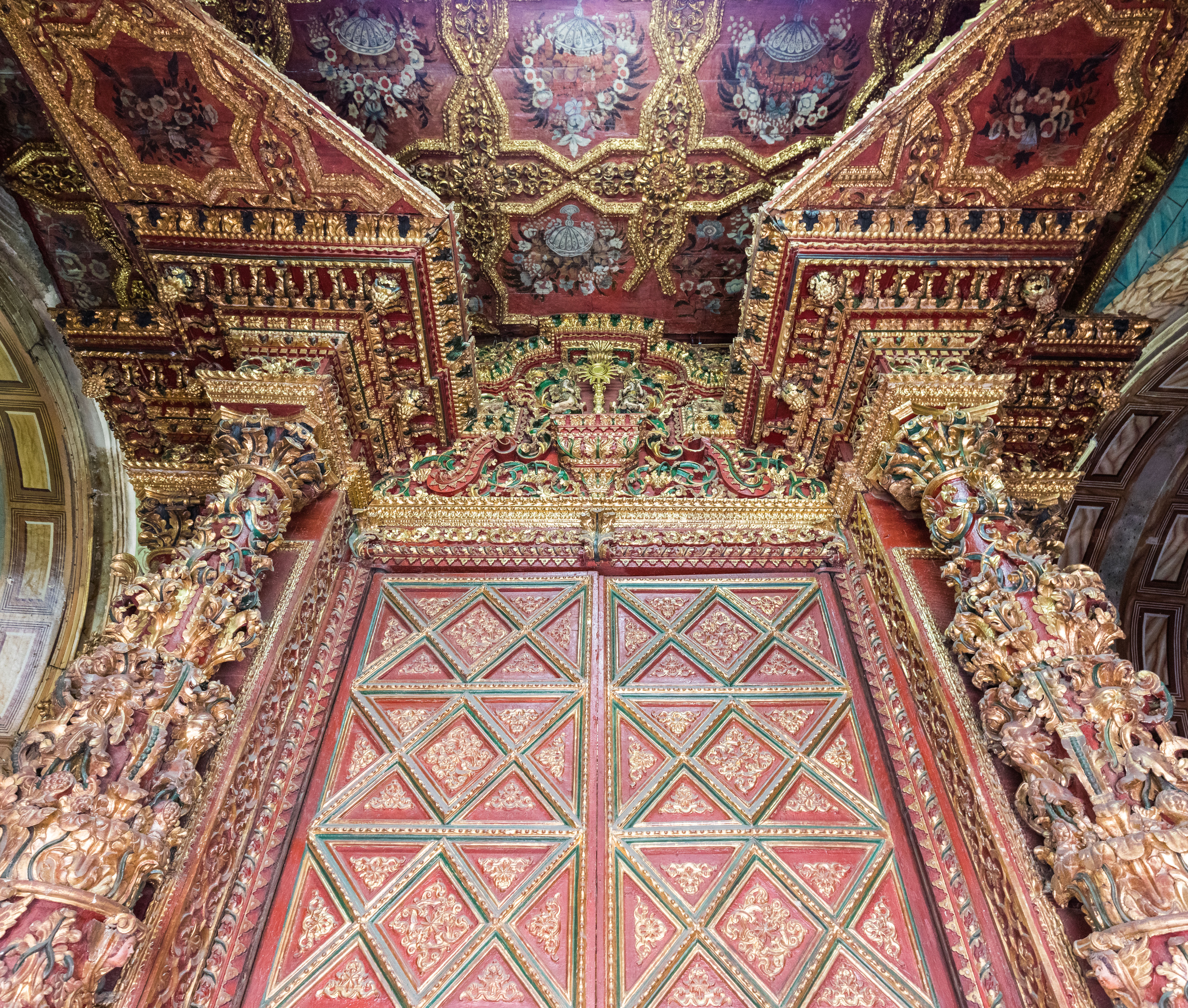
View from the base

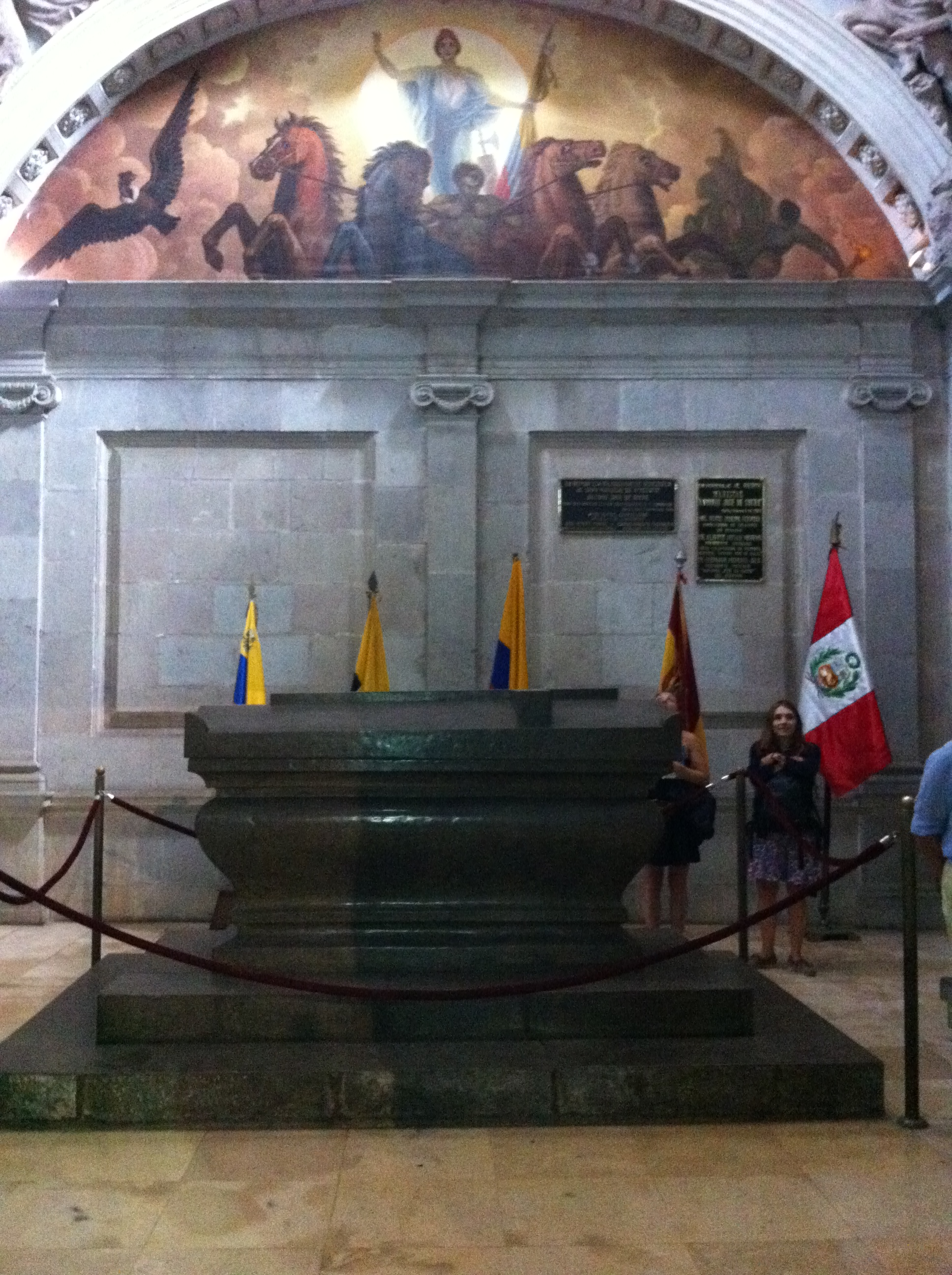
Mausoleum of the Venezuelan Liberator Antonio José de Sucre in El Sagrario

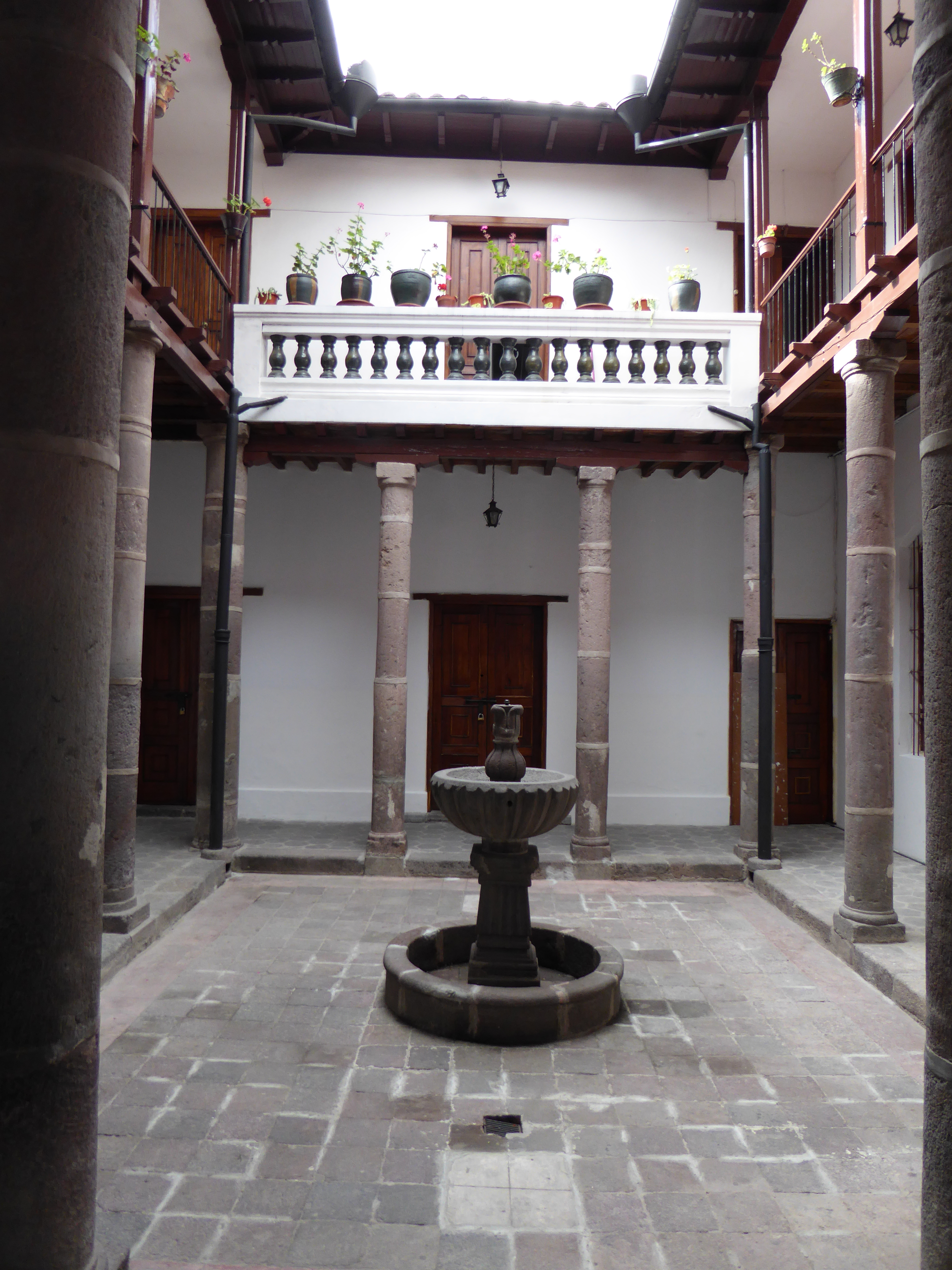
Parish house of El Sagrario

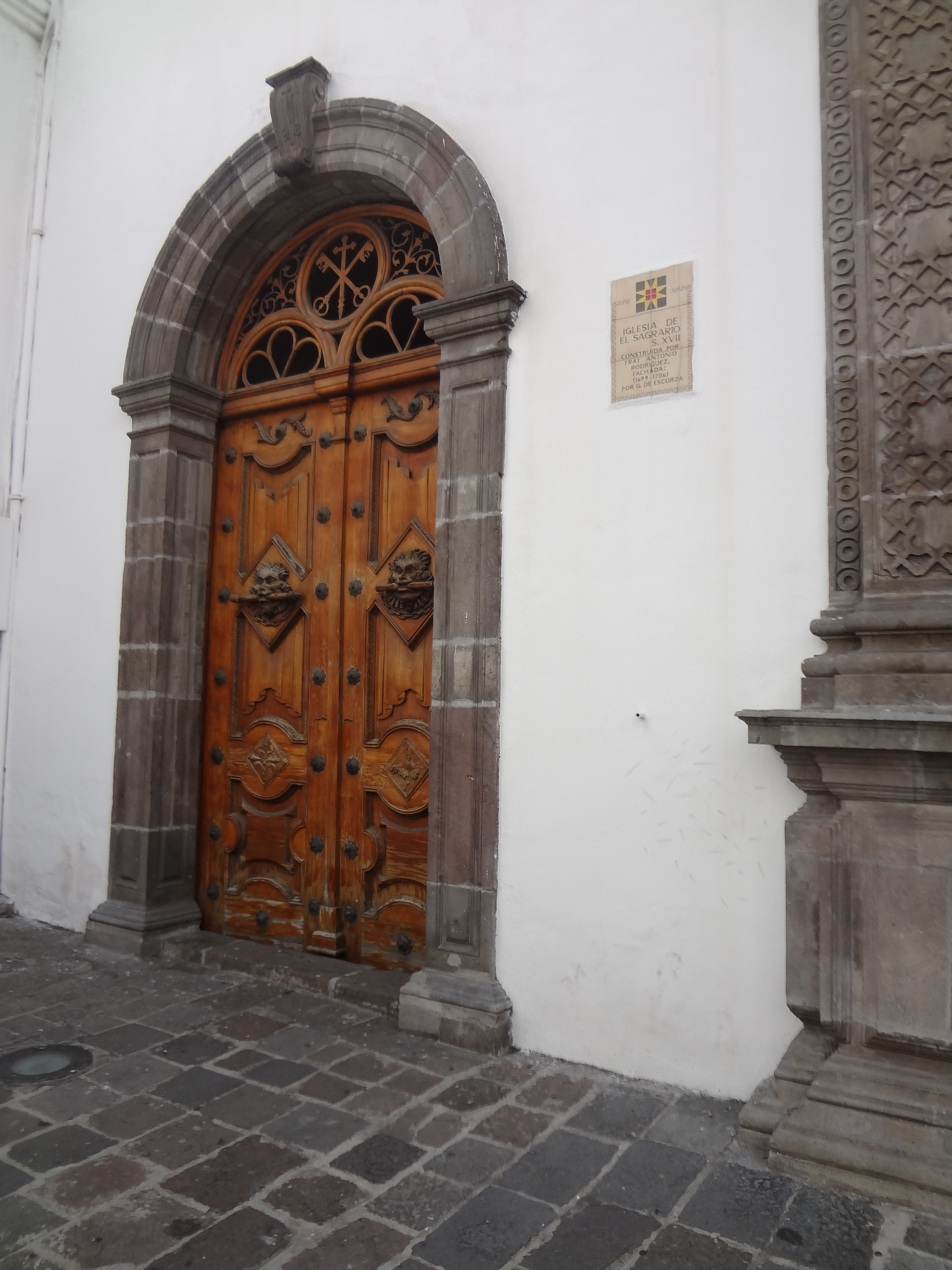
Colonial door

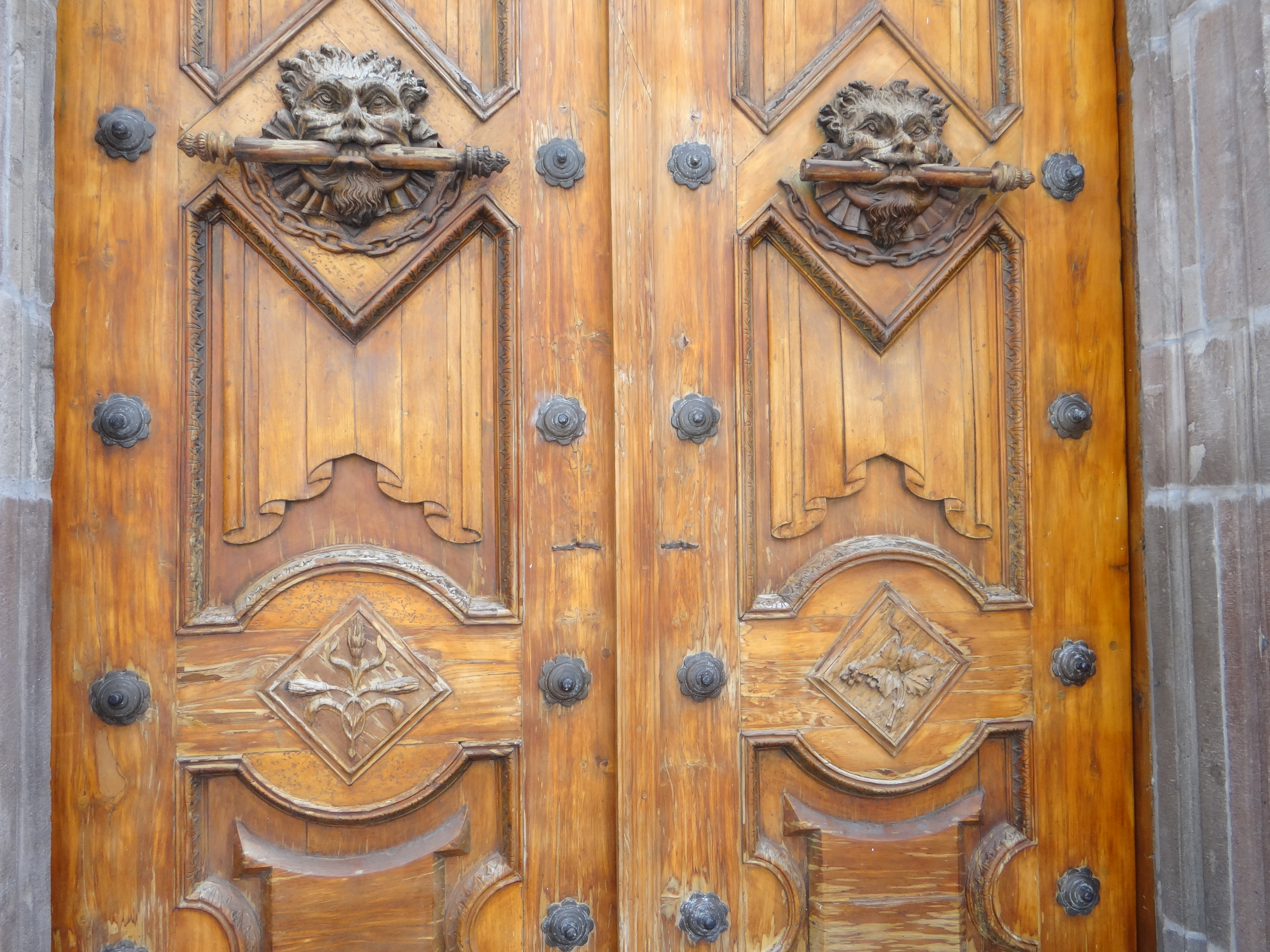
Colonial hand carved exterior door

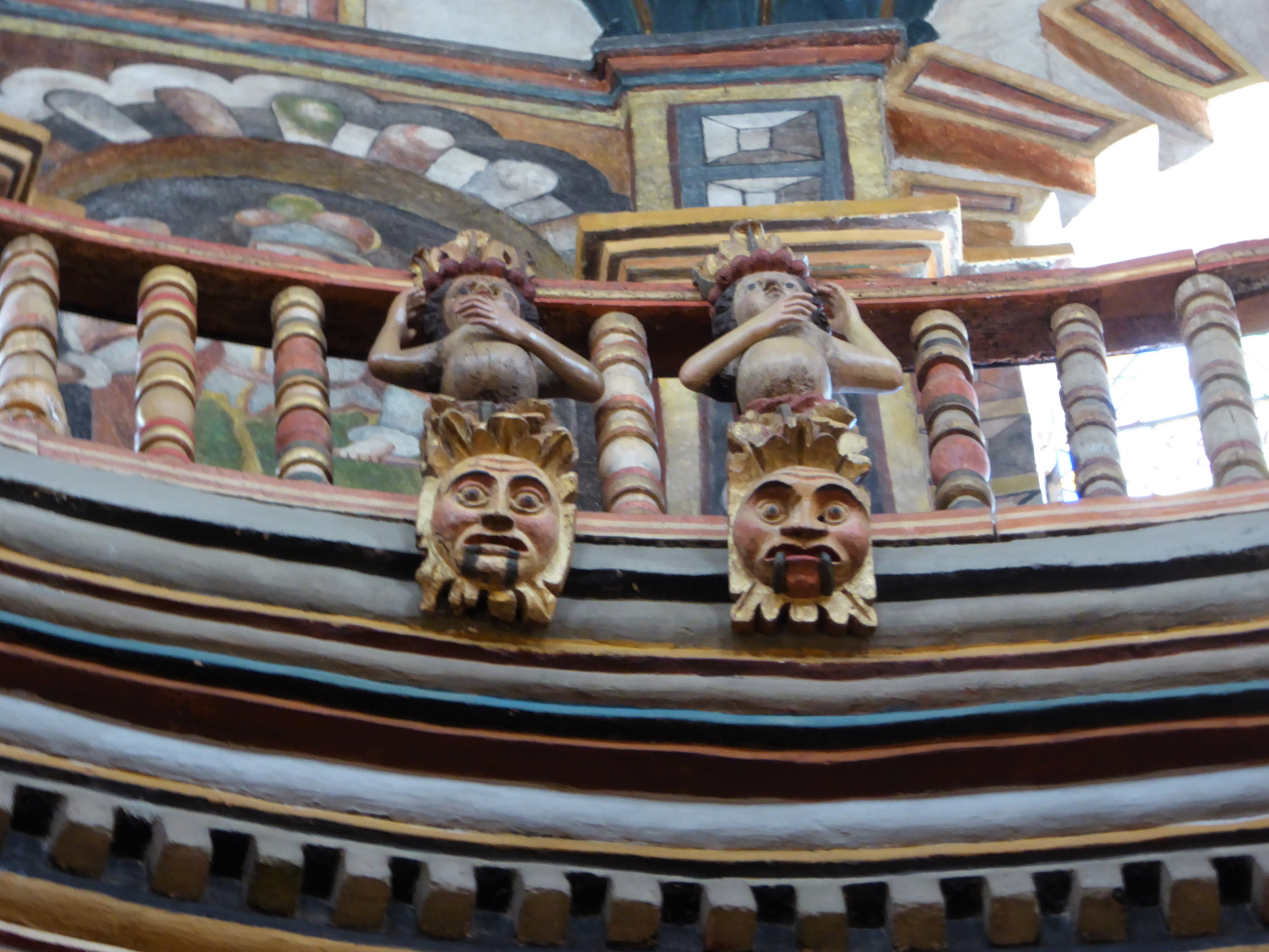
Detail

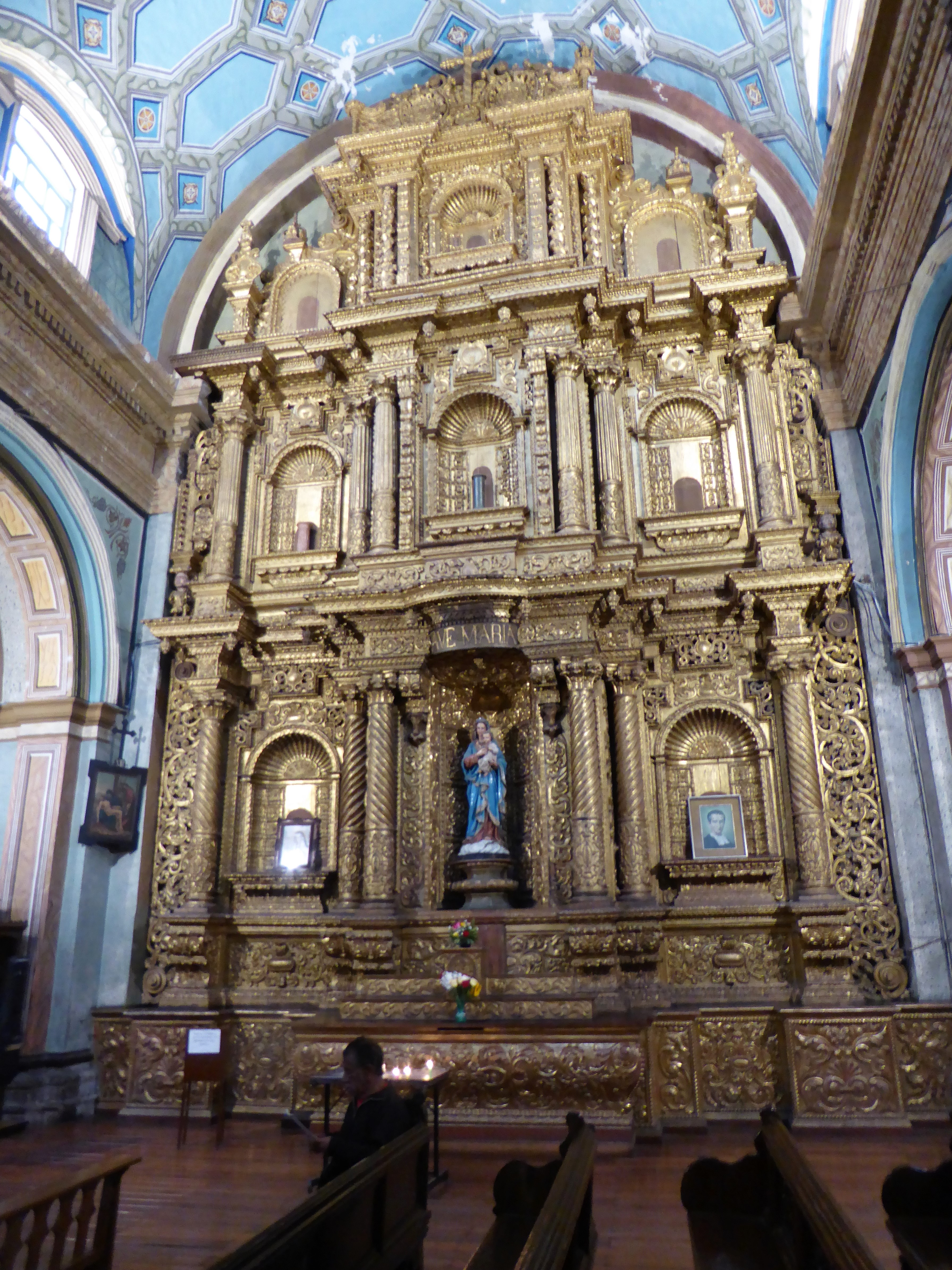
Reredos

== See also ==
- List of buildings in Quito
- 18th-century Western domes
