= Quito Metropolitan Cathedral =

Catholic cathedral in Quito, Ecuador

Quito Metropolitan Cathedral Catedral Metropolitana de Quito (in Spanish)
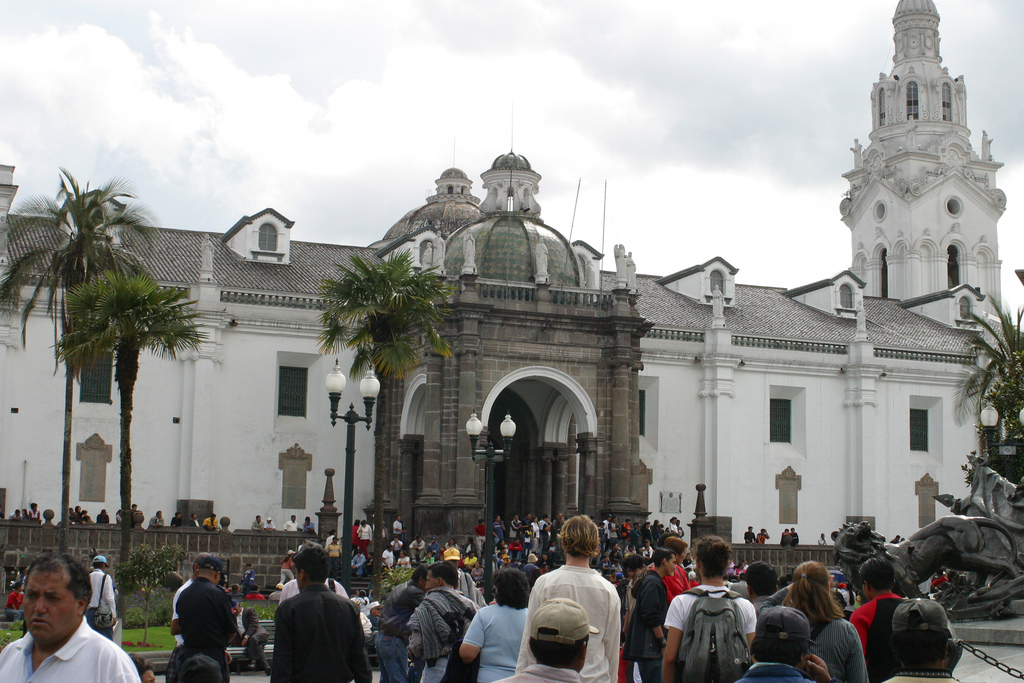

Religion
- Affiliation: Catholic Church
- Province: Province of Quito
- Rite: Roman Rite
- Ecclesiastical or organisational status: Metropolitan cathedral
- Leadership: Archbishop Fausto Trávez Trávez, O.F.M.
- Year consecrated: 1545

Location
- Location: Quito, Ecuador
- Interactive map of Quito Metropolitan Cathedral; Catedral Metropolitana de Quito (in Spanish)
- Coordinates: 0°13′13″S 78°30′51″W

Architecture
- Type: Christian basilical church
- Style: Baroque, Gothic-Mudéjar, Neoclassical
- Groundbreaking: 1535
- Completed: 1799
- Direction of façade: Northwest
- UNESCO World Heritage Site
- Type: Cultural
- Criteria: ii, iv
- Designated: 1978
- Parent listing: City of Quito
- Reference no.: 2

Website
- Website

The Quito Metropolitan Cathedral (Spanish: Catedral Metropolitana de Quito), is a Catholic cathedral in Quito, Ecuador. Located on the southwestern side of the Plaza de la Independencia (La Plaza Grande), it (and its predecessor building) served as a seat of the Diocese of Quito from 1545 until 1848 when it was elevated to Archdiocese. In 1995, it was elevated to the Cathedral of Ecuador, making it the seniormost Catholic church in the country.

== History ==
=== Background ===
Soon after the founding of the city of San Francisco de Quito (6 December 1534), the entire southern side of the future Plaza Grande was given over to the Church. The first temporary building, raised in the same year by Father Juan Rodriguez — first pastor of the fledgling town — was of adobe with wood frame and thatch roof. With the establishment of a parish of Quito (January 1545), a Bishop — García Díaz Arias — was named and reached the city on April 13 of the following year, along with Vicar General Pedro Rodríguez de Aguayo and plans to build a more eminent edifice.

=== Construction ===
Construction began in 1535 and became cathedral with the creation of the Bishopric of Quito in 1545. From 1562 to 1565, the building rose from its limestone foundations under the leadership of now Archdeacon Rodríguez de Aguayo, who served as acting bishop — Diaz Arias having died. The architect was Antonio García. Construction was of stone and the minga system (a local traditional practice of communal hauling, carving, and masonry) was utilized. Turning its flank broadside to the Plaza, the Church helped define its size and shape. The anomaly of the main entrance not fronting onto the Plaza is explained by the presence of a deep gorge (la quebrada de Sanguña or Zanguña) present at the time of construction, which precluded extending the building backwards (toward the southwest). The site, adjacent to the ravine, had been selected for defensive purposes. The ravine was itself overtopped by the Iglesia de El Sagrario in the 17th century. The cathedral was consecrated by the second bishop of Quito — Fray Pedro de la Peña — in 1572.

=== 17th century ===
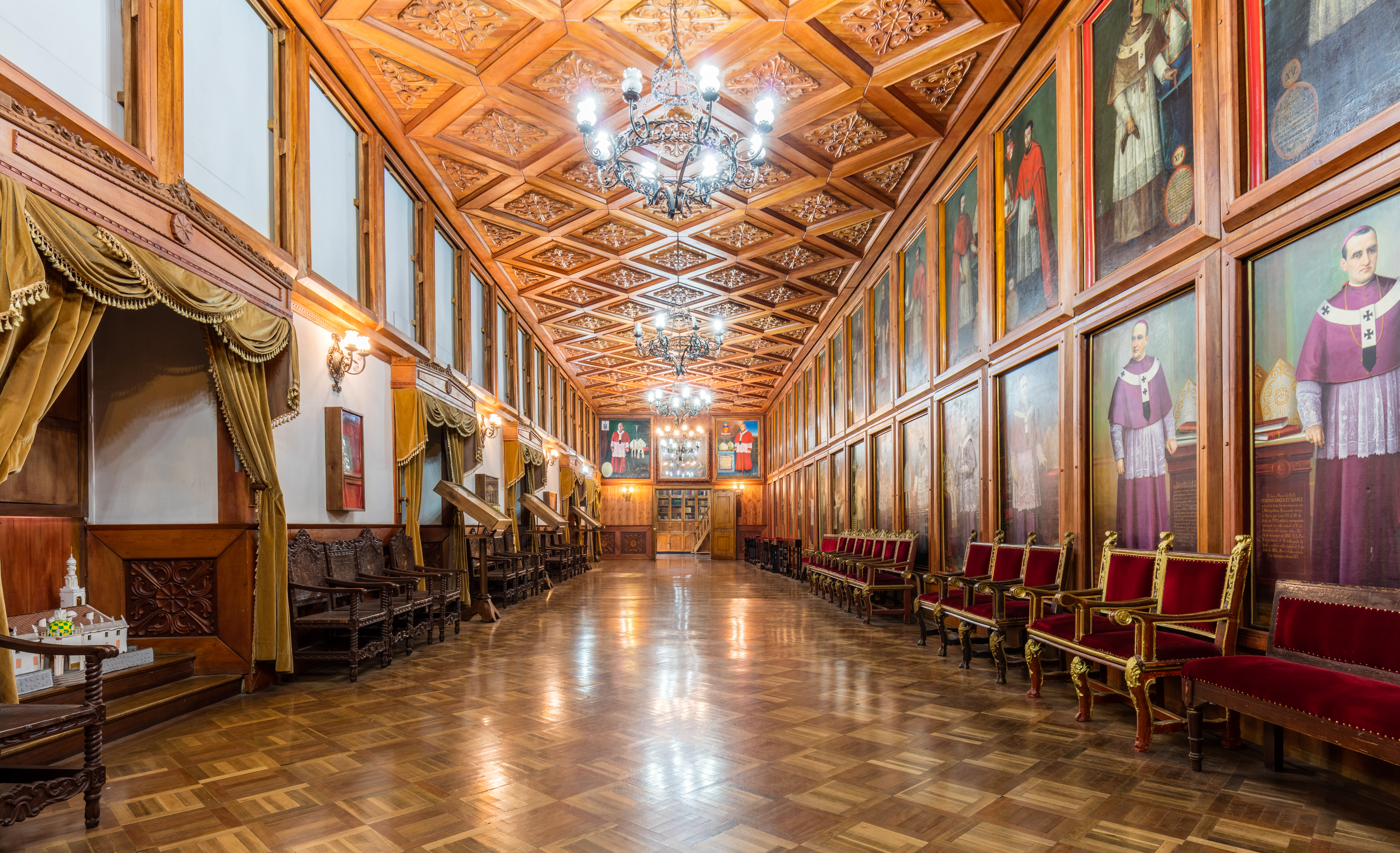
Chapter house located in today's museum

After the eruption of Mount Pichincha, a local volcano which struck Quito in 1660, the damaged Cathedral was rebuilt by order of Bishop Alfonso de la Peña y Montenegro. Much of its internal decor was reworked and it is from this period that Miguel de Santiago's painting of the Virgin Mary (Dormition of the Virgin), formerly in the main choir reredos, is dated. At this time the building was also lengthened toward the west, the aisles were connected behind the choir, and an opening made for a side doorway to the square. The sacristy was also extended and the separate chapter house (known as La Iglesia de El Sagrario) was built.

=== 18th century ===
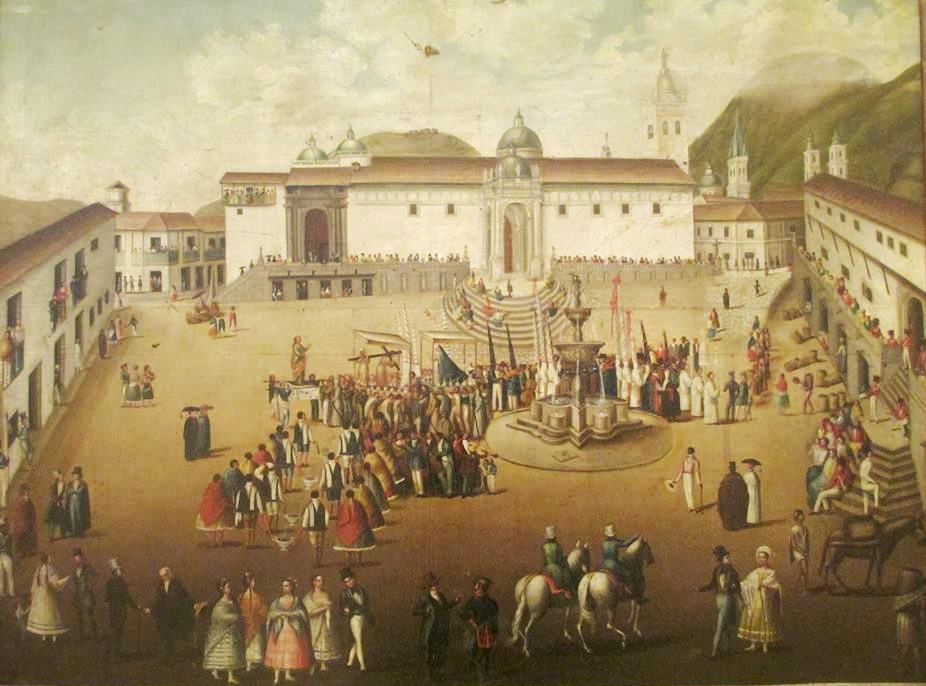
The Quito Metropolitan Cathedral in 1800, anonymous. Museum of the Bank of the Republic of Colombia

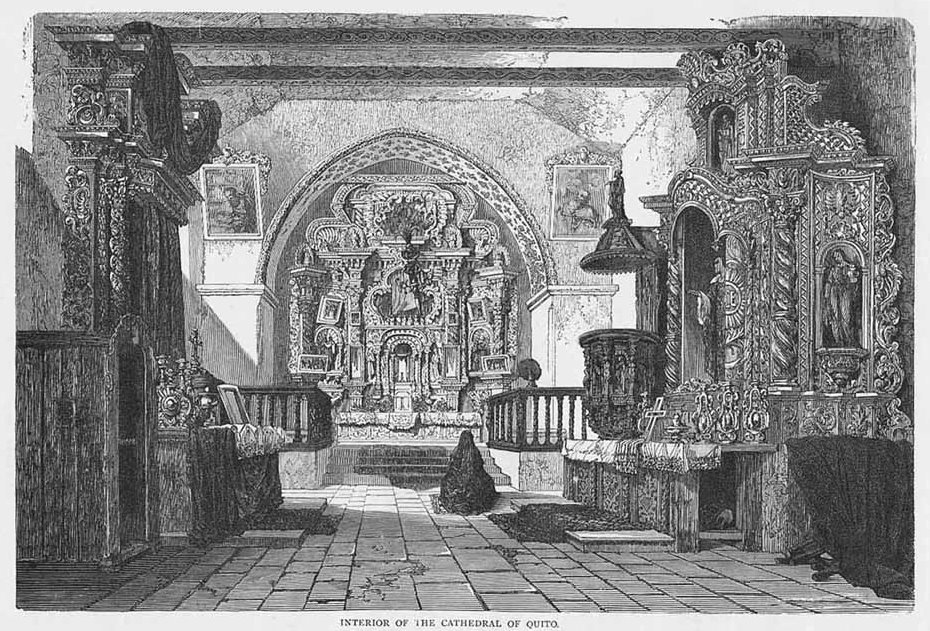
Interior of the Quito Cathedral in 1860 by Henry Walter Bates

A second reconstruction came in 1755 owing to an earthquake that struck the city in that year, although the work was relatively minor as the damage had not been significant. A more significant earthquake struck in 1797 at which time major changes were made to the interior decoration including a new choir. According to tradition, the artist known as Caspicara (Manuel Chili) participated in this and incorporated paintings of his teachers Manuel de Samaniego and Bernardo Rodríguez, removing from the choir de Santiago's great 17th century canvas Dormition and replacing it with Samaniego's El Tránsito de la Virgen. The present gilt wooden pulpit was re-surfaced at this time.

=== 19th century ===
The cathedral was enhanced in 1797–1799, during the administration of the 20th President of the Real Audiencia Baron Héctor de Carondelet, by the addition of the Carondelet Arch, a work of Spanish military engineer Antonio García. The early 19th century also saw the replacement of the original 16th-century Mudéjar-style coffered ceiling with a copy. (This was itself replaced by another copy in the mid-20th century.) Earthquakes again damaged the building in 1858 and '59, this time deteriorating the belltower. It was restored in 1930.

The catacombs of the Cathedral have served as a resting place for many important figures in Ecuador's history, such as independence leader Antonio José de Sucre (1795–1830), who is laid to rest in his own Mausoleum Chapel. On 13 January 1848 the Diocese of Quito was elevated to an archdiocese.

The small altar of Nuestra Señora de los Dolores (English: "Our Lady of Sorrows") has a plaque showing where President Gabriel García Moreno was shot in 1875. The murder of the Bishop of Quito, José Ignacio Checa y Barba, took place here during the mass of Good Friday, 30 March 1877, when he was poisoned with strychnine dissolved in the consecrated wine. The cathedral is also the burial place of several other presidents of the Republic, as well as of bishops and priests who died in the diocese.

=== 20th century ===
Along with the early 19th century coffered ceilings, the transverse arches of the side naves were replaced in the mid-20th century. (The latter largely destroyed a curious mural painting which perhaps dated from the 17th century.) The tall campanario (belfry) was restored in 1930. In the wake of a 1987 earthquake, the municipality of Quito has structurally restored the deep foundations of the cathedral with micropile technology. In 1995 the Cathedral of Quito was elevated to the Cathedral of Ecuador, making it the seniormost Catholic church in the country. Restorations of the artium and the parapet were undertaken in 1997 and 1999 respectively.

== Description ==
The cathedral is a white-painted monumental church with a single high belltower offset to the right of the main entrance. Built on a plan comprising three longitudinal naves surmounted by semi-ogival arches on square pillars, the basic spatial structure of the cathedral is typical of the 16th century. Based upon interior features — especially the details of the pillars, arches, and the carved and coffered ceiling — some experts assert that the cathedral should be characterized as Gothic-Mudéjar in style. It has Gothic features in the pointed arches of its naves, as well as in the ambulatory that surrounds the presbytery.

=== Exterior ===
In a deviation from Spanish convention, the Cathedral actually has two main entrances: one at mid-nave that faces the Plaza and the other, with the belltower, at the northwest facade facing Calle Garcia Moreno. The axis has a southeast–northwest orientation due to the local topography: 16th century ravines prevented the main facade from facing the plaza, as is customary. The elaborate arched side-entrance and its semi-circular staircase facing the Plaza were an early 19th-century addition. Known as the Carondelet Arch, this portal is the main interface between Cathedral and square. The relationship is also underlined by a longitudinal stone parapet running the length of the building on that side (and decorated with spheres, pyramids, etc.) which preserves the difference in level between the Cathedral floor and that of the Plaza. Three attractive domes dressed in glazed green ceramic rise atop the transept, the high altar, and the Carondelet Arch. The transept dome is itself surmounted by an iron rooster weather vane, subject of several local legends. (These Neo-Classical domes, along with the neo-classical balustrade sculptures, various arches, Ionic pilasters, and the semi-circular Plaza staircase are modernizing 19th century additions.)

Plaques on the exterior walls of the Cathedral commemorate the fourth centenary (1934) of the founding of the city: first, the site is celebrated as the launching point of the Amazon expedition of Francisco de Orellana (1511–1546). ("It is the glory of Quito to have discovered the great River of the Amazons.") The next five name the five founders of the city. Then: "Quito, Patrimony of Humankind". Finally, "Cathedral, Main church construction, 16th century (1545–1572); Restoration, 17th–18th & 20th centuries".

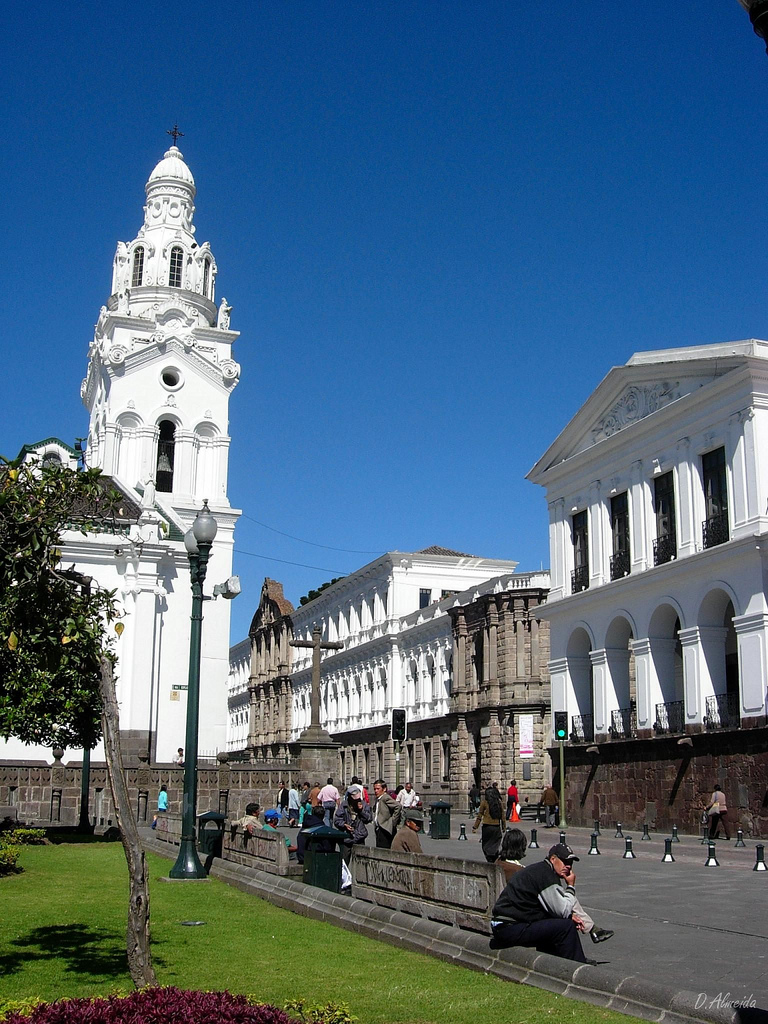
Bell tower

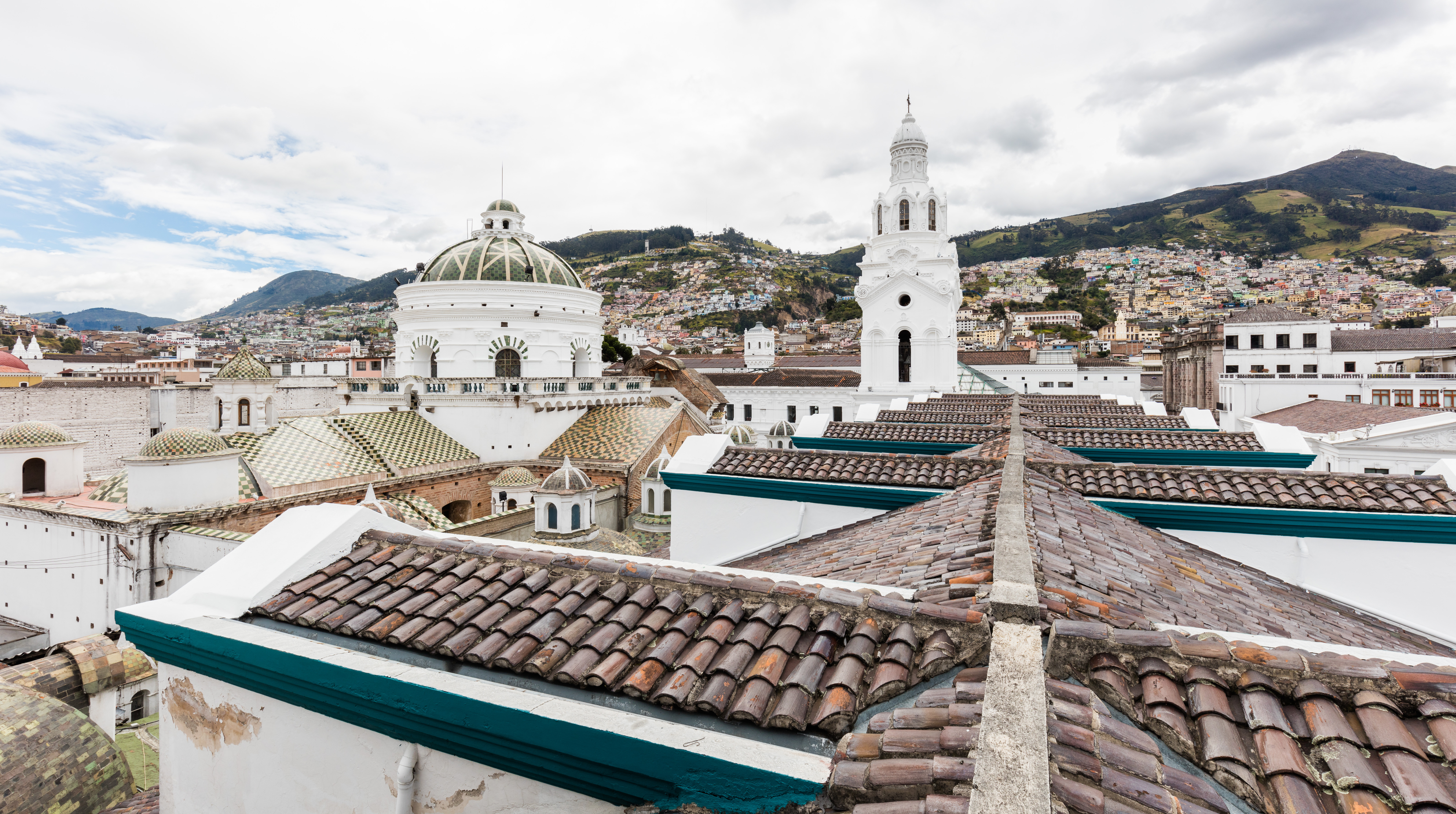
Roof, domes, lantern roofs and bell tower

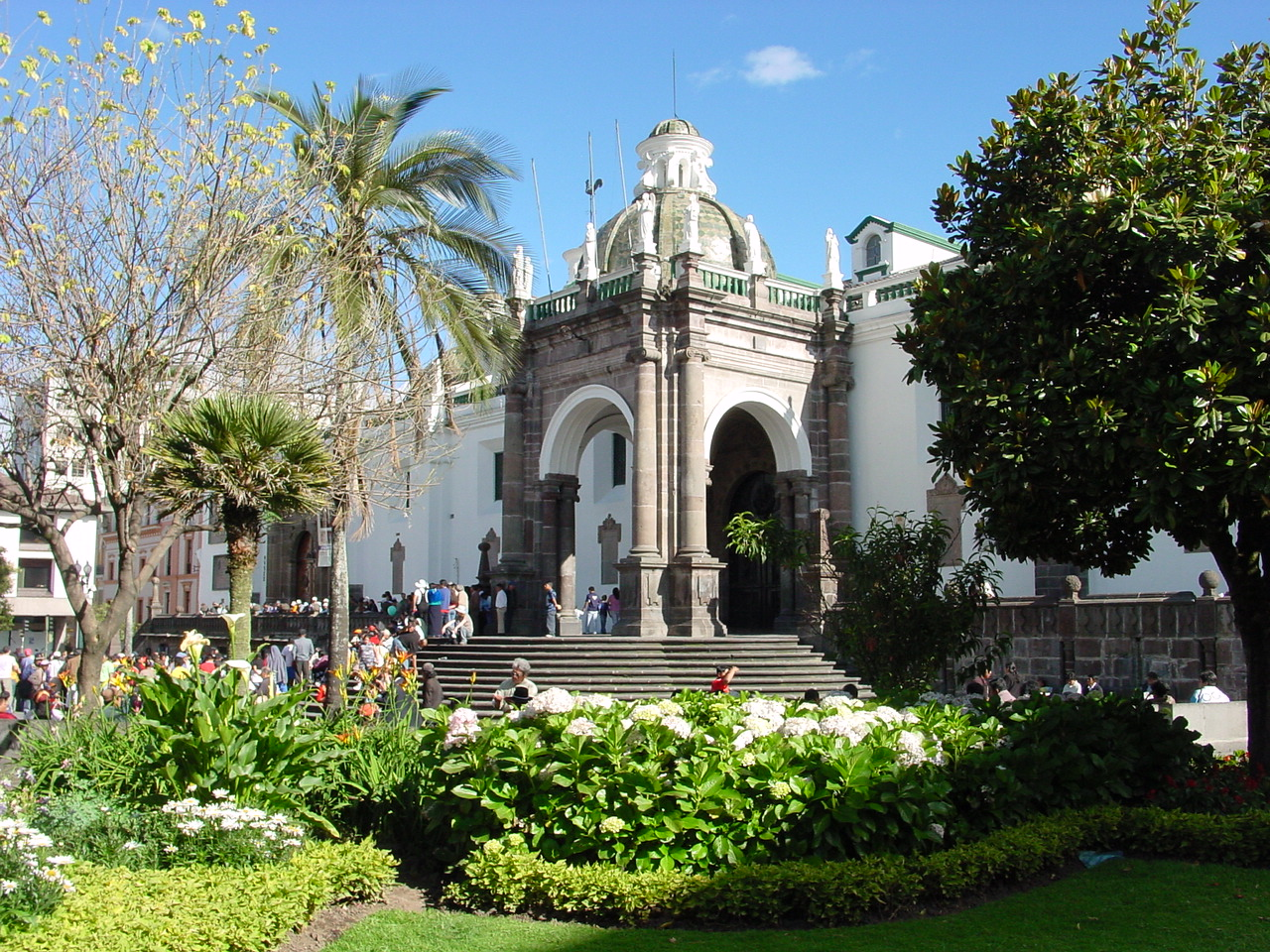
The northeast elevation of the cathedral, on the Plaza, is dominated by the "Arch of Carondelet" entrance (built in 1797) and its staircase.

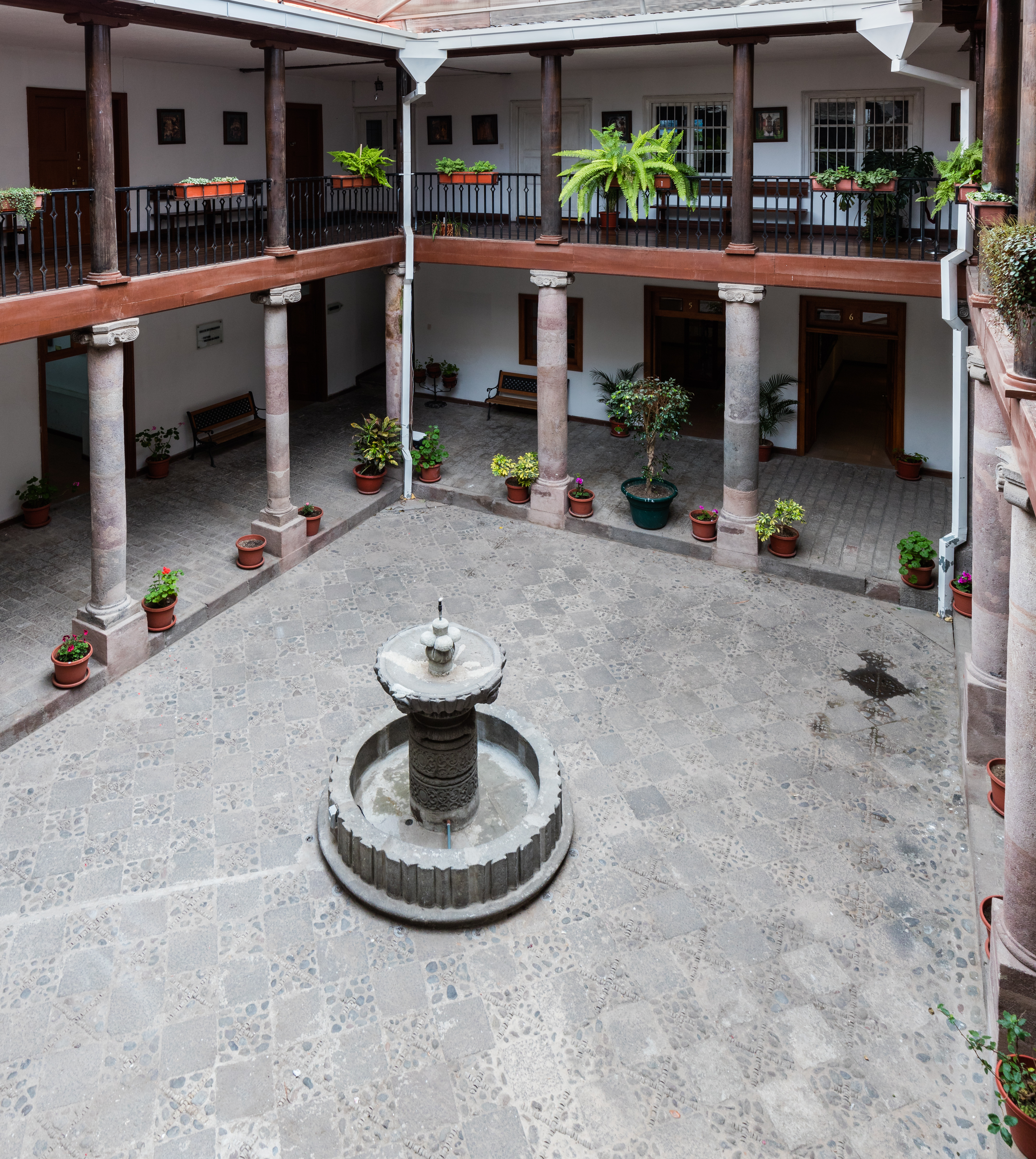
Cathedral's museum

=== Interior ===
Inside, the three naves are supported by pointed arches, which in turn are supported by pillars with square bases. The central nave has cedar panelling reflecting Moorish influences. An extraordinary wooden coffered ceiling is supported by a golden frieze and beautiful paintings hang among the arches. The right nave opens into several chapels along the wall, each surmounted by domes with skylights. The chapels, in order, are: All Souls; Calvary; The Denial of Peter; Saint Peter, First Pope of the Church; The Sacred Family. Here also is a large wooden carved door, in a semi-circular arch, leading to La Iglesia de El Sagrario [Church of the Sanctuary], a 17th-century chapel attached to the main building which is usually locked. (El Sagrario is accessed from outside the cathedral.)

Works by artists of the Quito School of Art, based in the nearby Church and Convent of St. Francis, adorn the interior of the cathedral. The side reredos, covered with goldleaf, were carved by the early masters of that school and in their niches are placed images of saints and martyrs. The large painting of the Assumption of the Virgin, from 1793, located in the upper choir, is the work of Manuel de Samaniego, all in sky and blue. The altarpiece of the Chapel of All Souls has the notable sculptural group known as The Denial of St. Peter, attributed to Father Carlos. Other notable Cathedral artworks include the Altarpiece (Retablo) of Santa Ana (comprising images of Saint Joaquín, Saint Joseph, and Saint Ann and dating to the 18th century); Bernardo Rodríguez’s Cure of the Lame by Saint Peter; the 1734 sculpture Inmaculada of Bernardo de Legarda (the replica of which watches over Quito from the top of El Panecillo); also, the Adoration of the Three Magi and the Cure of the Crippled (a mural).

The high altar, said to be entirely of gold, shows both Baroque and Mudéjar patterns.

There area works of art by the colonials Miguel de Santiago, Manuel Chili "Capiscara" and Bernardo Rodríguez, who painted the fresco with biblical images in the central nave of the cathedral Further down, following the curve of the apse, the row of cedar chairs of the Cabildo, dated 1794, painted and covered in gold by magnificent artisans.

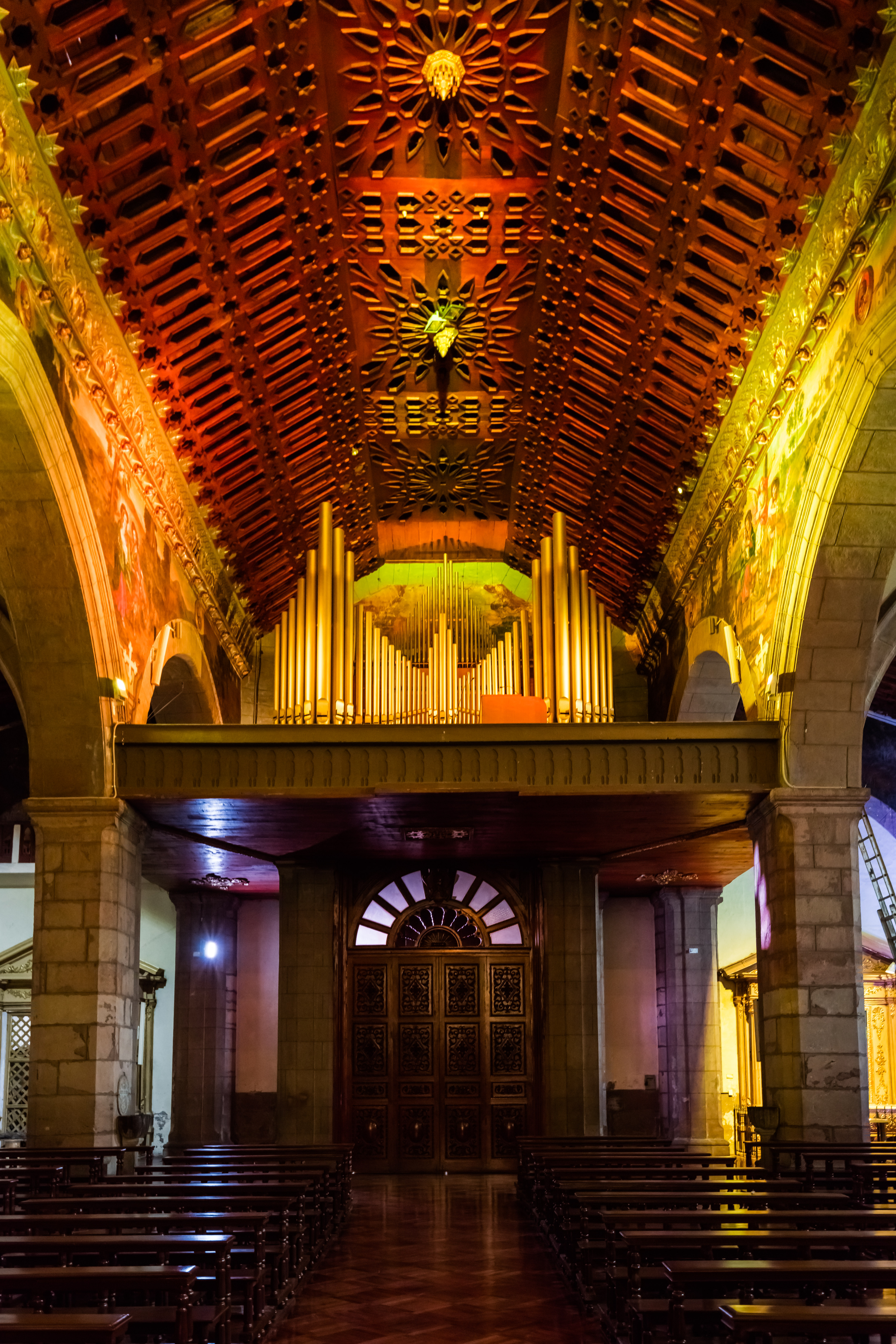
View of the main nave from the altar (pipe organ from the 18th century)

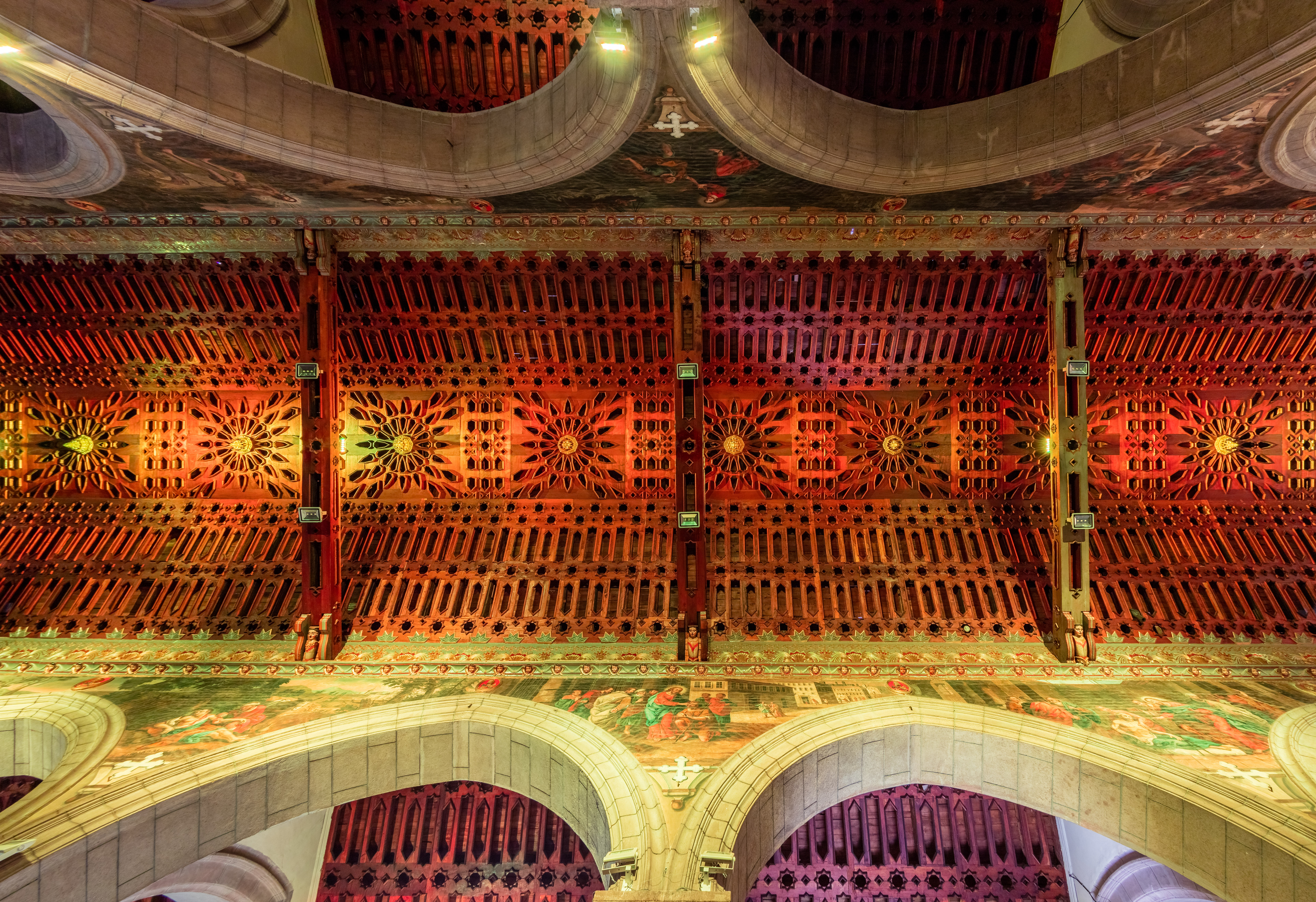
17th-century Mudéjar artesonado of the main nave

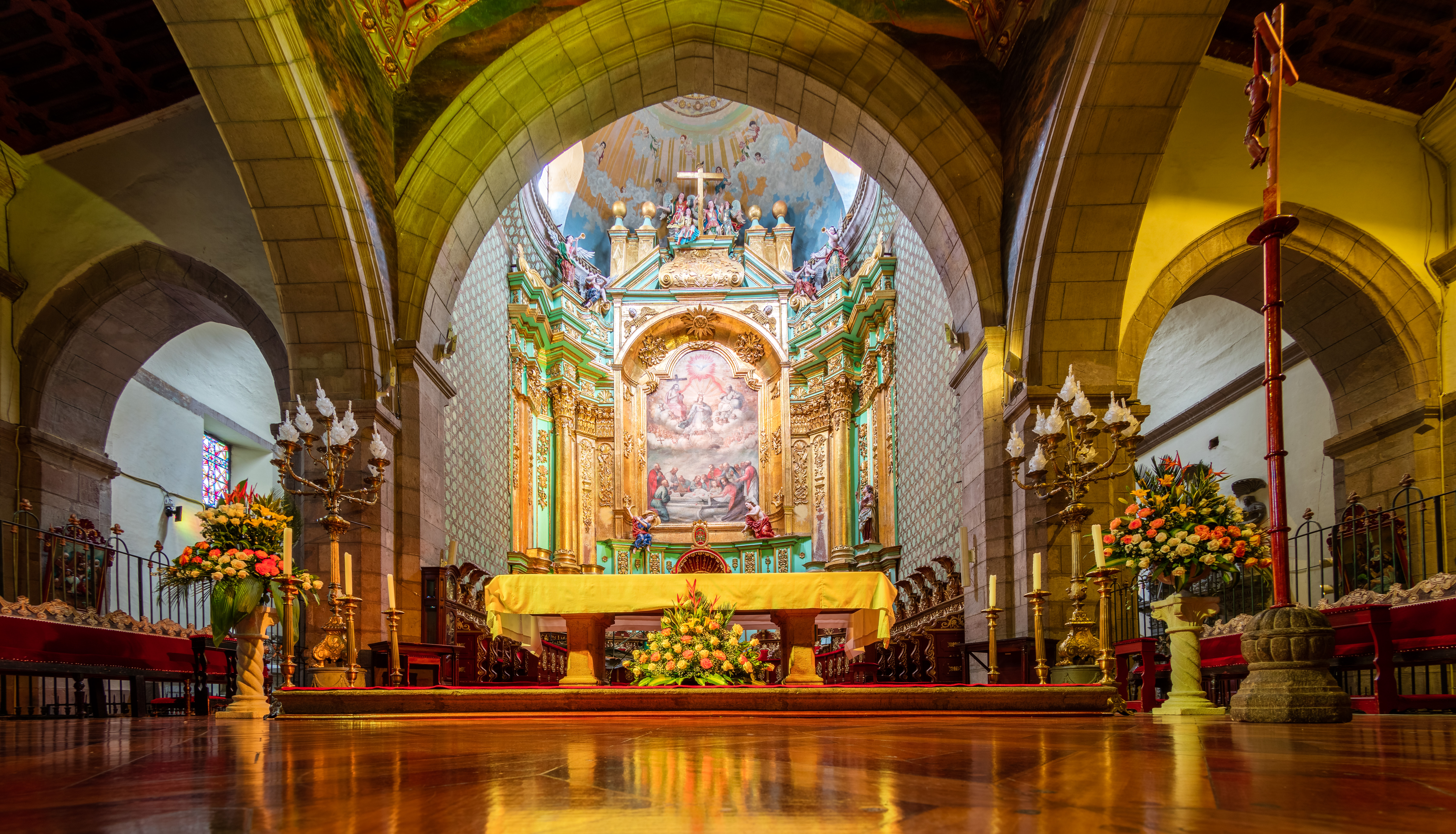
The 18th-century Altarpiece of Santa Ana

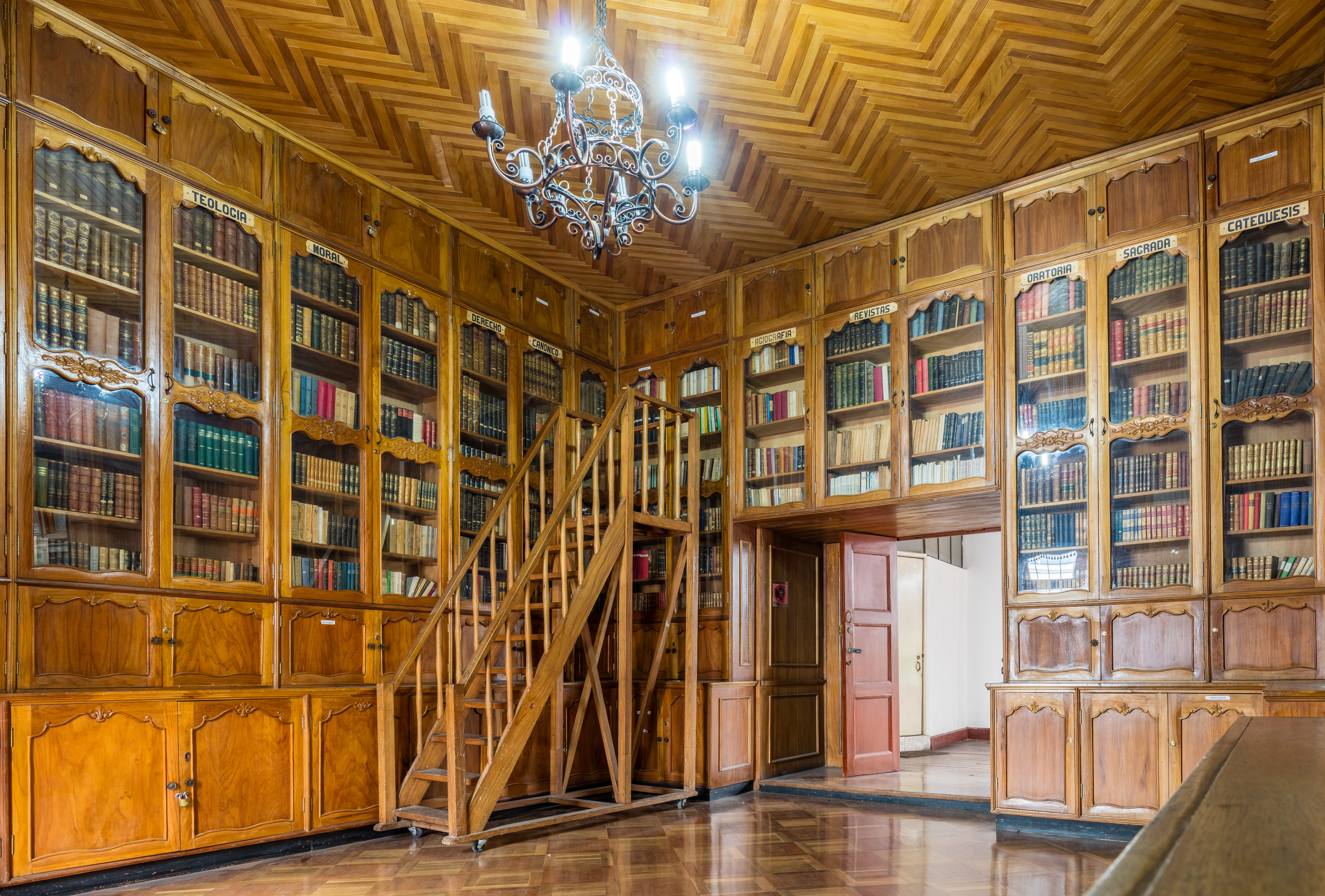
Archiepiscopal library

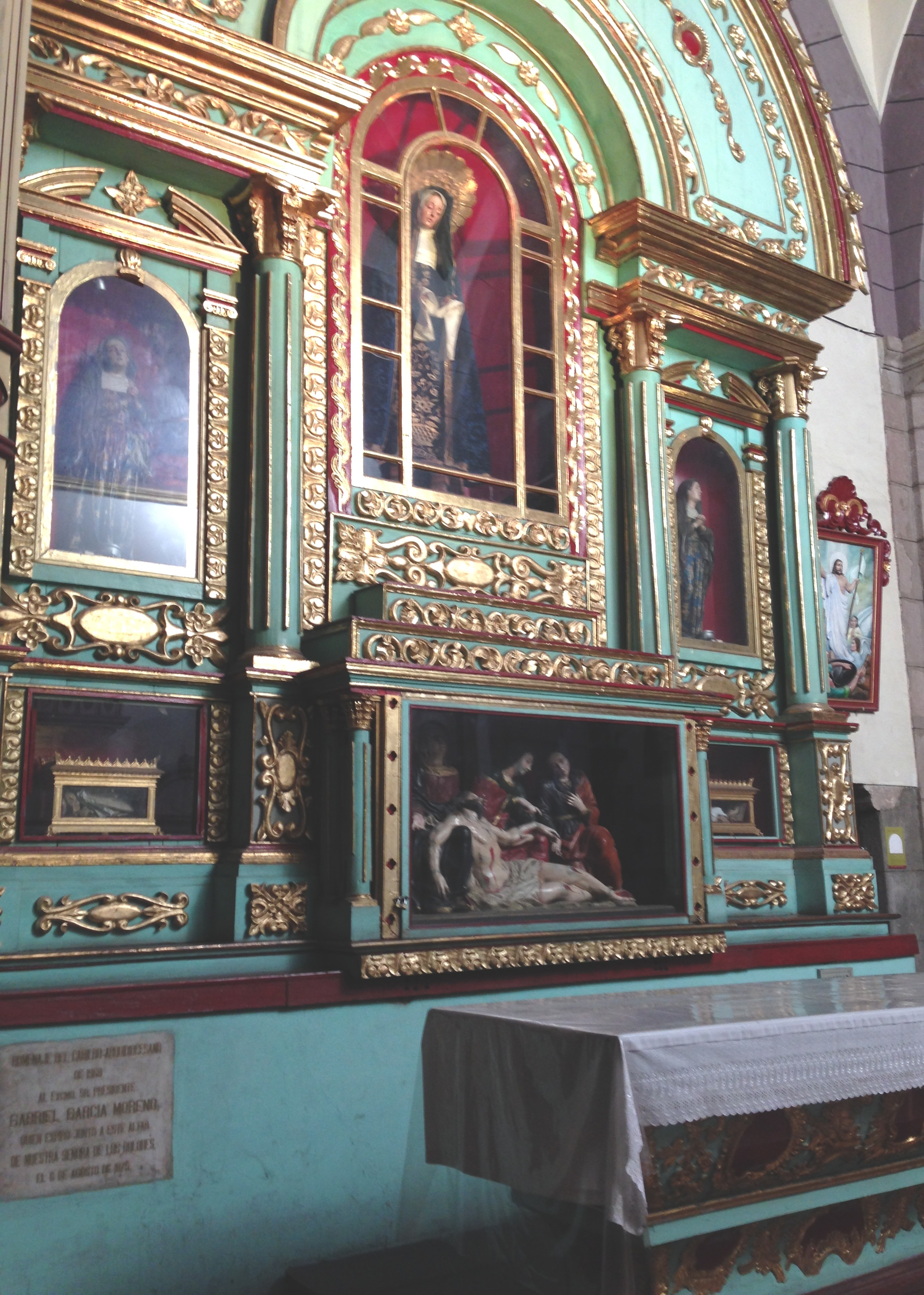
Altar of the Our Lady of Sorrows

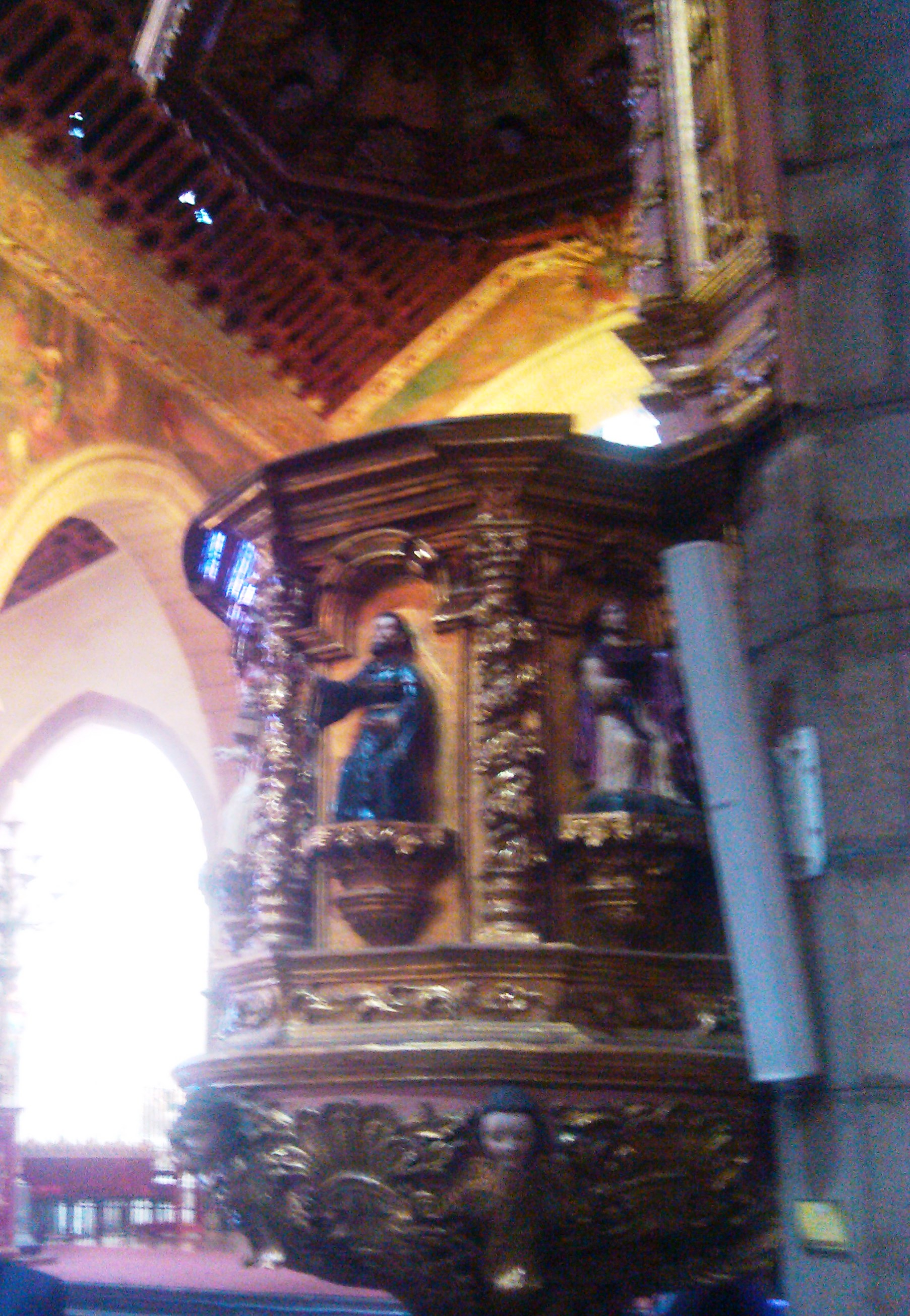
Pulpit

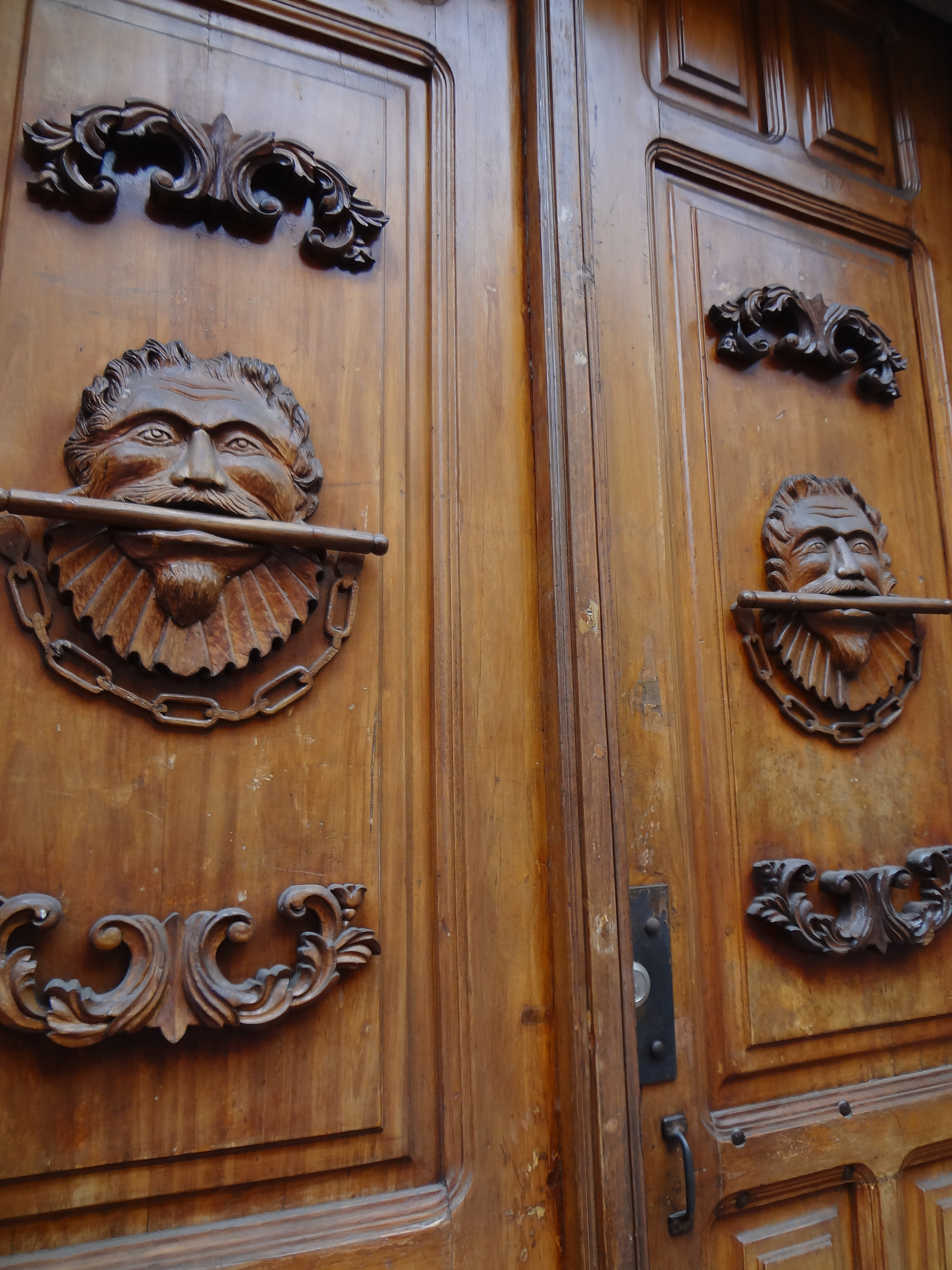
A colonial carved door

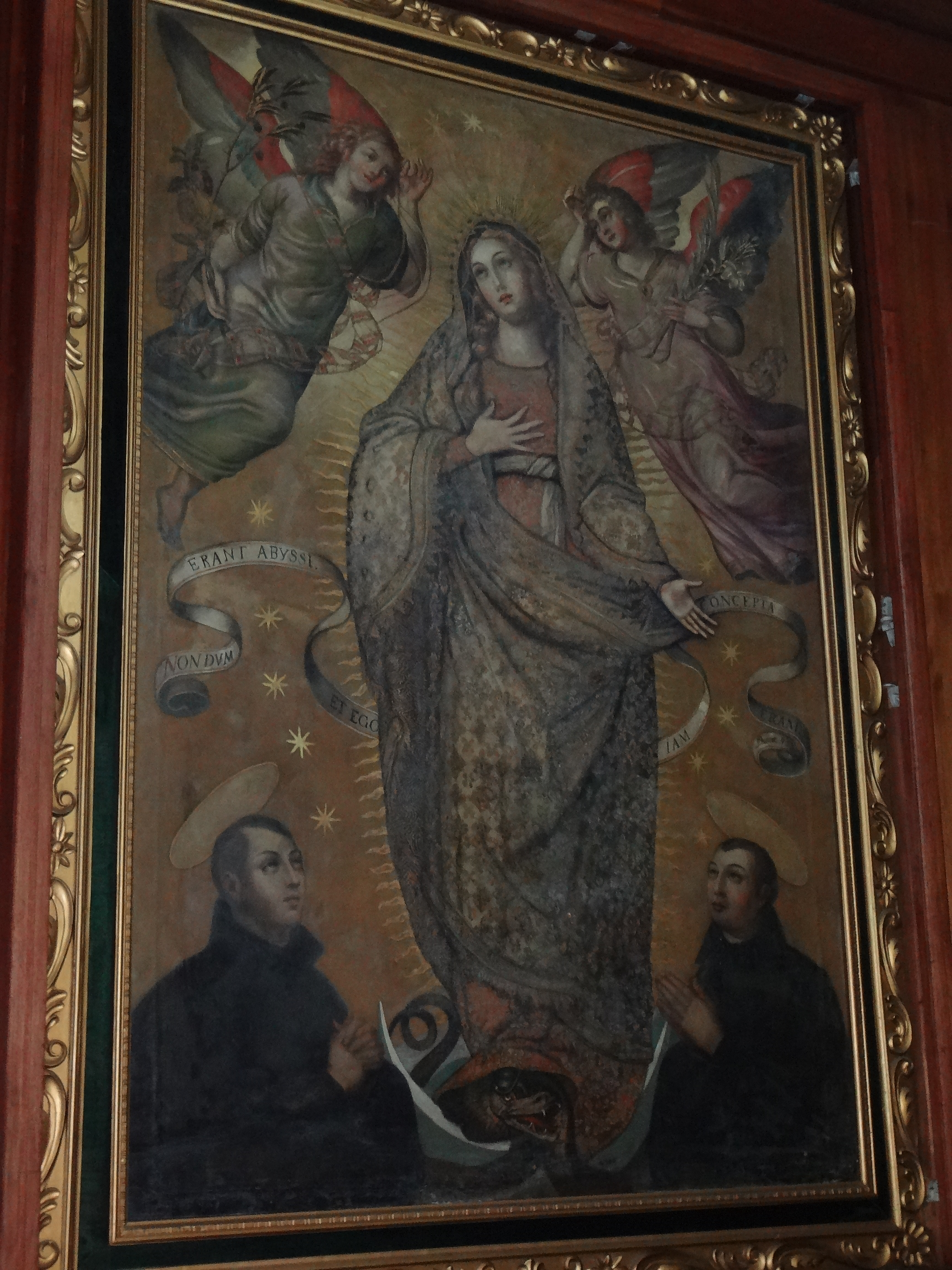
Colonial Quito School painting in the cathedral museum

== El Arrastre de Caudas ==
On the Wednesday of Holy Week, a liturgy is held called "el Arrastre de Caudas", roughly "the dragging of the trains", said to be unique to this cathedral. It derives from ancient Roman practice, in which a banner was passed over the body of a deceased general and then flown over his troops in a symbolic transfer of his qualities to them. The ceremony originated in Seville and passed to its suffragan dioceses of Quito and Lima, surviving only in Quito since the sixteenth century. The "cauda" is a black cloth several meters in length that sweeps the floor behind each of the cathedral canons as they process through the aisles of the cathedral as part of a larger procession of clerics including the archbishop carrying a relic of the True Cross. A second large cloth banner, black with a red cross, covers the altar and then is waved by the archbishop over the cathedral canons who have prostrated themselves after processing with their trains and then over the congregation.

== See also ==
- List of buildings in Quito
