= San Juan de Dios Hospital =

San Juan de Dios Hospital may refer to:

- San Juan de Dios Hospital (Granada), Spain
- San Juan de Dios Educational Foundation, Pasay, Philippines
- San Juan de Dios Hospital (Santiago), Chile
- San Juan de Dios Hospital (Quito), Ecuador
