= Dominique Domec =

French surgeon, founder of the school of surgery in Quito (Ecuador)

- Born: September 1, 1845; Ossun-ez-Angles (France)
- Died: October 11, 1884; Quito (Ecuador)
- Citizenship: French
- Occupations: Surgeon and professor of anatomy

Academic background
- Education: Faculty of Medicine in Montpellier (France)
- Thesis: Clinical Study of Typhoid Fever

Academic work
- Discipline: Anatomy
- Sub-discipline: Surgery
- Institutions: Faculty of Medicine in Quito (Ecuador) and Free Faculty of Medicine and Pharmacy in Lille (France)
- Notable works: Founding of the Quito School of Surgery

Dominique Domec was a French surgeon and professor of anatomy. He was born in Ossun-ez-Angles (Hautes-Pyrénées) on 1 September 1845 and died in Quito (Ecuador) on 11 October 1884. He helped to establish the Ecuadorian medical school of surgery in the second half of the 19th century.

== Biography ==
Dominique Domec was born on 1 September 1845 in Ossun-ez-Angles (Hautes-Pyrénées), a small village of the French Pyrenees near Lourdes. He was the son of François Domec (1800–1881), a farmer and mayor of Ossun-ez-Angles, and Anne Dabadie (1803–1867), who came from a family of surgeons. He was the youngest of ten children. He studied at the seminary in Saint-Pé de Bigorre and then in Toulouse. He subsequently studied at the Faculty of Medicine in Montpellier from 1865 to 1868, and was awarded the faculty’s top honours in 1867 and 1868.

He was appointed hospital resident in 1869. During the Franco-prussian War of 1870-1871, he served as chief surgeon in the Aude Mobile Forces’ Ambulance Corps and took part in the Eastern Campaign with Bourbaki’s army. After the war, he returned to Montpellier and defended his doctoral thesis in medicine in 1871 on the Clinical Study of Typhoid Fever. He became a senior registrar, but failed the examination to become professor (agrégation) in 1872.

Professor Étienne Gayraud, surgeon at the faculty of medicine in Montpellier, set out in 1873 on a mission to Quito (Ecuador) at the request of President Gabriel García Moreno. Moreno, who had studied in Paris, was highly committed to modernising his country and promoting education, and he wanted to establish a modern medical school in Quito. Étienne Gayraud accepted this mission and agreed to become dean of the faculty, on condition that he could be assisted by Dominique Domec, whom he described as "one of the most distinguished junior doctors at the Saint-Éloi Hospital in Montpellier ". Dominique Domec joined Étienne Gayraud in Quito in May 1874, having been "accredited by the Government of Ecuador as a professor of anatomy and authorised by it to procure in France all the instruments and devices necessary for the study of anatomy and physiology".

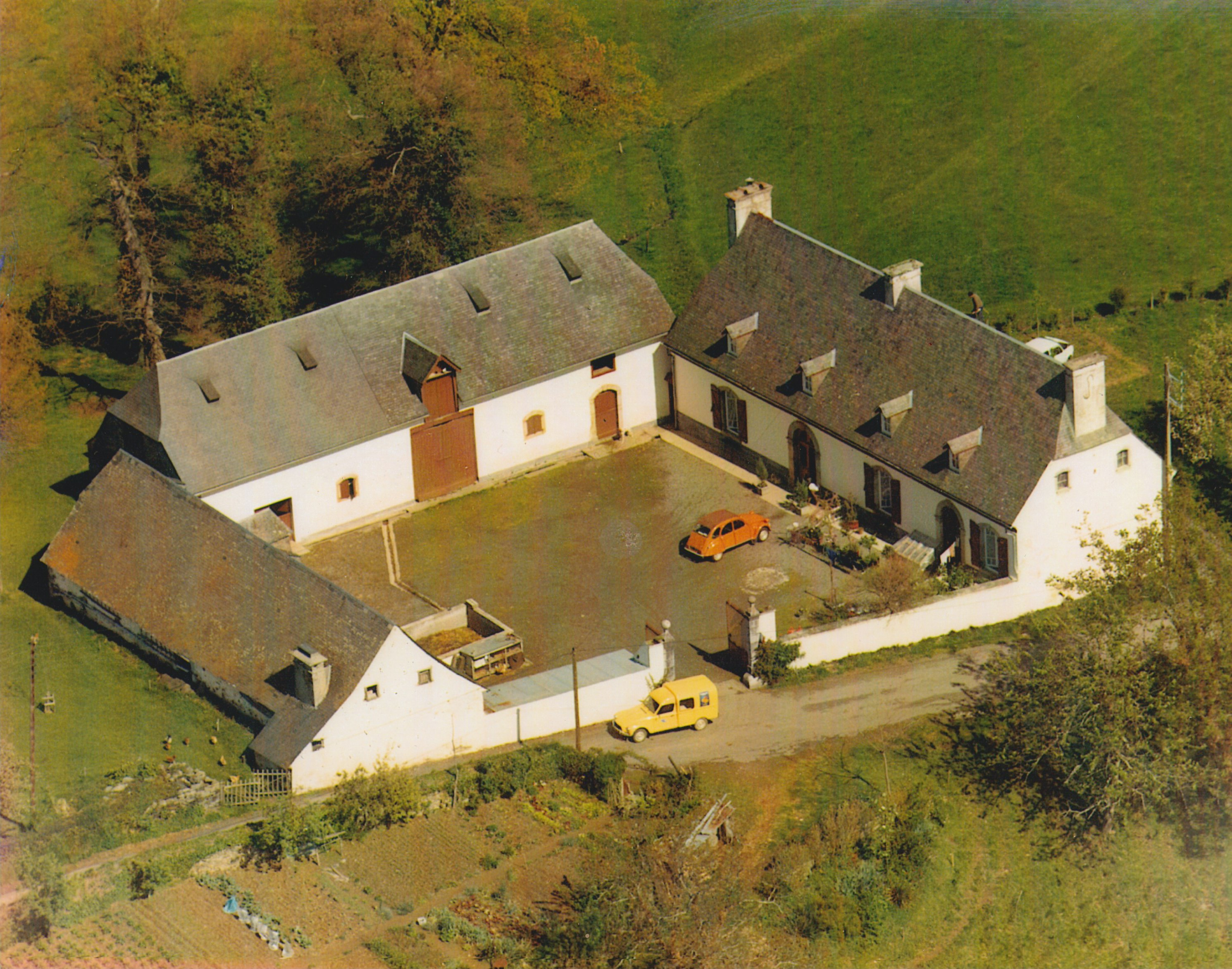
Birthplace of Dominique Domec in the French Pyrenees (Ossun-ez-Angles)

Following the assassination of President Gabriel Garcia Moreno in 1875, Professor Étienne Gayraud decided to terminate his mission and return to France. Dominique Domec initially replaced him as dean. On 28 August 1876, in Quito, he married Elina Muñoz (1856–1884), who had been widowed in 1874 following the death of José María Meneses, and was the mother of two children born in 1873 and 1874.

As the development of education was no longer a priority for the new government, Domec decided in turn to return to France, turning down offers made by Moreno’s successors: "We were saddened to see such well-equipped and well-maintained laboratories fall into abandon. Those instruments, devices, machines: dismantled, damaged and covered in a thick layer of dust".

On his return to France, Dominique Domec was appointed professor of anatomy and then of surgery at the Free Faculty of Medicine and Pharmacy in Lille in 1877, and was entrusted with the teaching on syphilitic diseases. He was a surgeon at the Saint-Raphaël dispensary in Lille, and was one of the founders of the Société des Sciences Médicales and the Journal des Sciences Médicales de Lille.

In 1882, Dominique Domec gave up teaching owing to his worsening health. According to Étienne Gayraud, his illness was linked to his "overworking himself to keep abreast of his many responsibilities". Dominique Domec and his wife decided to return to Quito, in the hope that the mild climate there would be beneficial to his health. A few weeks after his wife’s death in a car accident, Dominique Domec died in Quito on 11 October 1884 from "mental exhaustion, which seems to be the sad lot of the intellectual elite", "far from his homeland, his family and his friends who loved him so dearly".

== Scientific work and publications ==
San Juan de Dios Hospital (now museum of medicine)

As part of the mission entrusted to him by President Gabriel García Moreno, Professor Étienne Gayraud had an anatomy amphitheatre built and created the Chair of Anatomy and Dissection at the San Juan de Dios Hospital (Quito). His objective was to enable medical students to acquire practical clinical training rather than exclusively theoretical training, as had previously been the case. Étienne Gayraud and Dominique Domec passed on their technical expertise to their Ecuadorian colleagues through teaching during surgical procedures and in lectures given in the anatomy amphitheatre of the Quito Faculty of Medicine. Dominique Domec contributed to the introduction of chloroform anaesthesia and to techniques for preserving cadavers with formalin for pedagogical purposes.

Étienne Gayraud and Dominique Domec compiled their medical and surgical observations made in Quito in a book entitled La Capitale de l’Équateur au point de vue médico-chirurgical (The Capital of Ecuador from a Medical and Surgical Perspective), published in 1886 (after Dominique Domec’s death) and reissued in 2013. In addition to his contribution to the development of surgery, Dominique Domec studied the epidemiology of tuberculosis and raised awareness about the beneficial impact of Quito’s climate and altitude on the incidence and prognosis of tuberculosis.

Books and article by Dominique Domec

Medical thesis on thyphoid fever

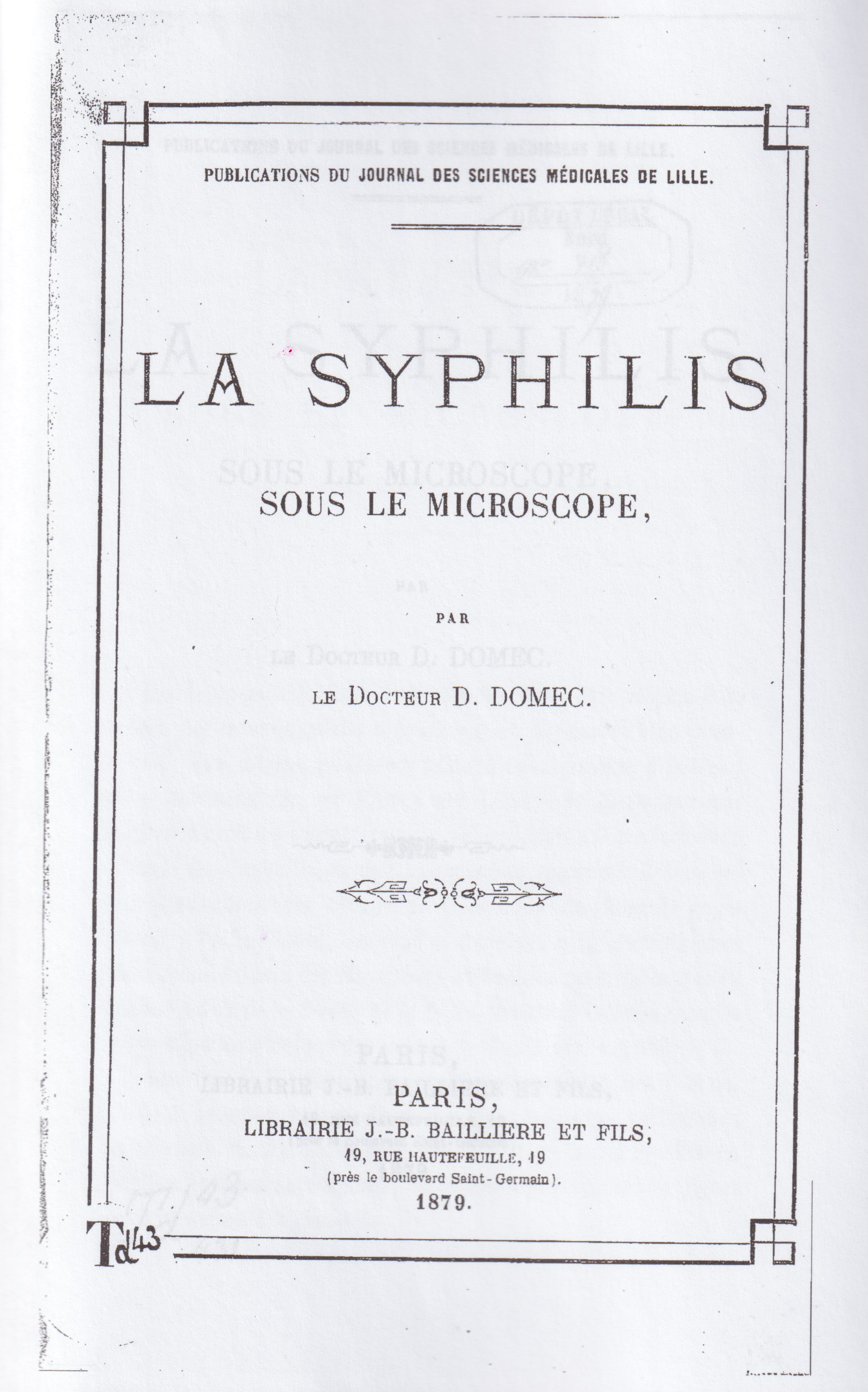
Syphilis under the microscope

The Capital of Ecuador from a Medical and Surgical Perspective

Dominique Domec authored several scientific articles: L'Empoisonnement par la strychnine, observation et réflexions (1877) (Strychnine Poisoning: Observations and Reflections); Sur la désarticulation de la hanche (1878) (On hip dislocation); La Syphilis sous le microscope (1879; re-issued in 2018) (Syphilis under the microscope); La Chirurgie dite conservatrice au lit du malade (1879) (So-called conservative surgery at the patient’s bedside); Quelques considérations sur les causes de revers dans les opérations (1880) (Some thoughts on the causes of setbacks in operations).
