= Hospital Carlos Andrade Marín =

Hospital de Especialidades Carlos Andrade Marín
- Instituto Ecuatoriano de Seguridad Social
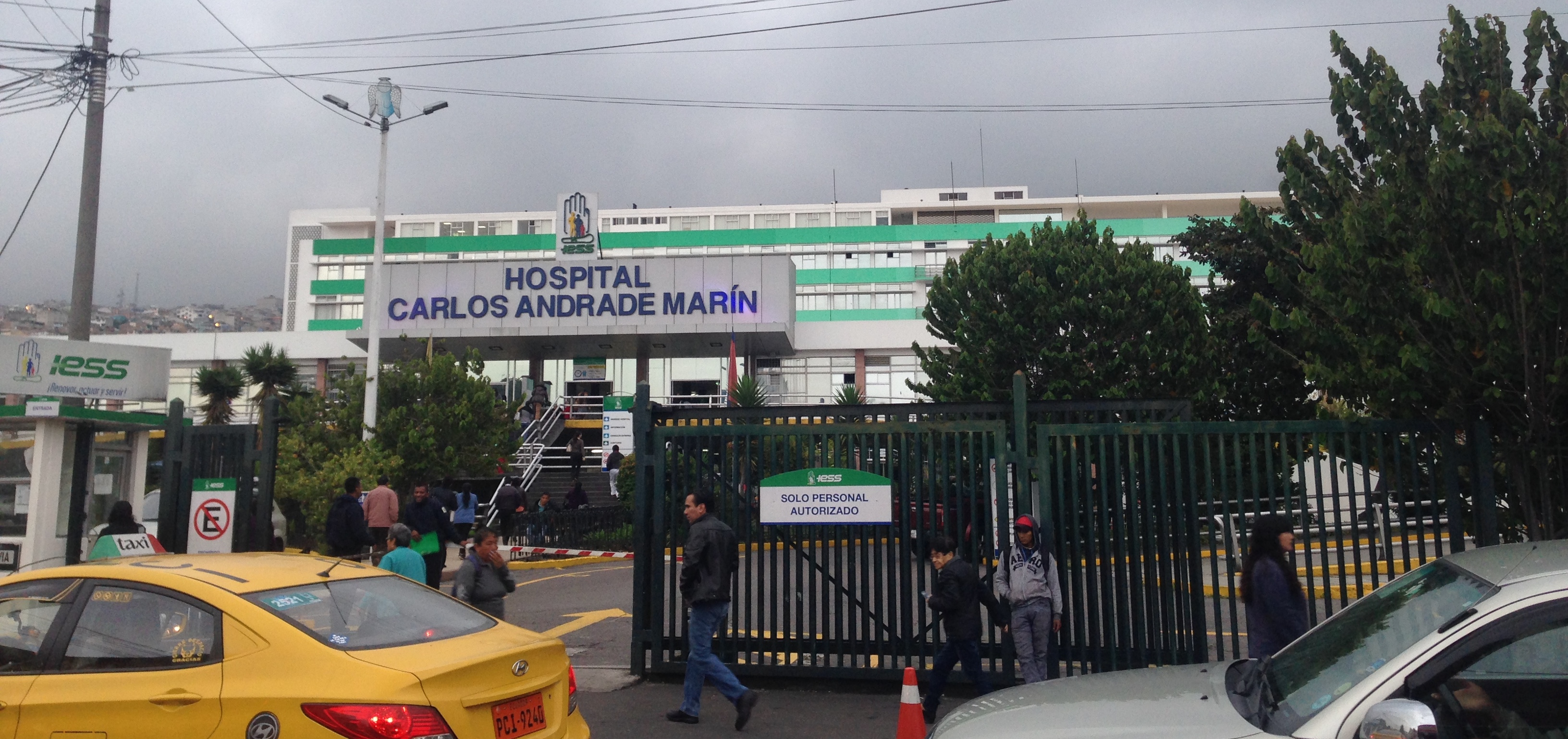
- Main entrance of the Hospital de Especialidades Carlos Andrade Marín

Geography
- Location: Quito, Highlands, Pichincha, Ecuador
- Coordinates: 0.20513°S 78.50446°W

Links
- Website: hcam.iess.gob.ec
- Lists: Hospitals in Ecuador

Carlos Andrade Marín, c. 1954

Hospital de Especialidades Carlos Andrade Marín also known as HCAM or HECAM, is a teaching hospital in Quito, Ecuador, managed by the Instituto Ecuatoriano de Seguridad Social (IESS). The hospital is located in the center of Quito. It offers full services to those covered by social security.
