= City Museum (Quito, Ecuador) =

History museum in Quito, Ecuador

Coordinates: 0°13′23″S 78°30′54″W

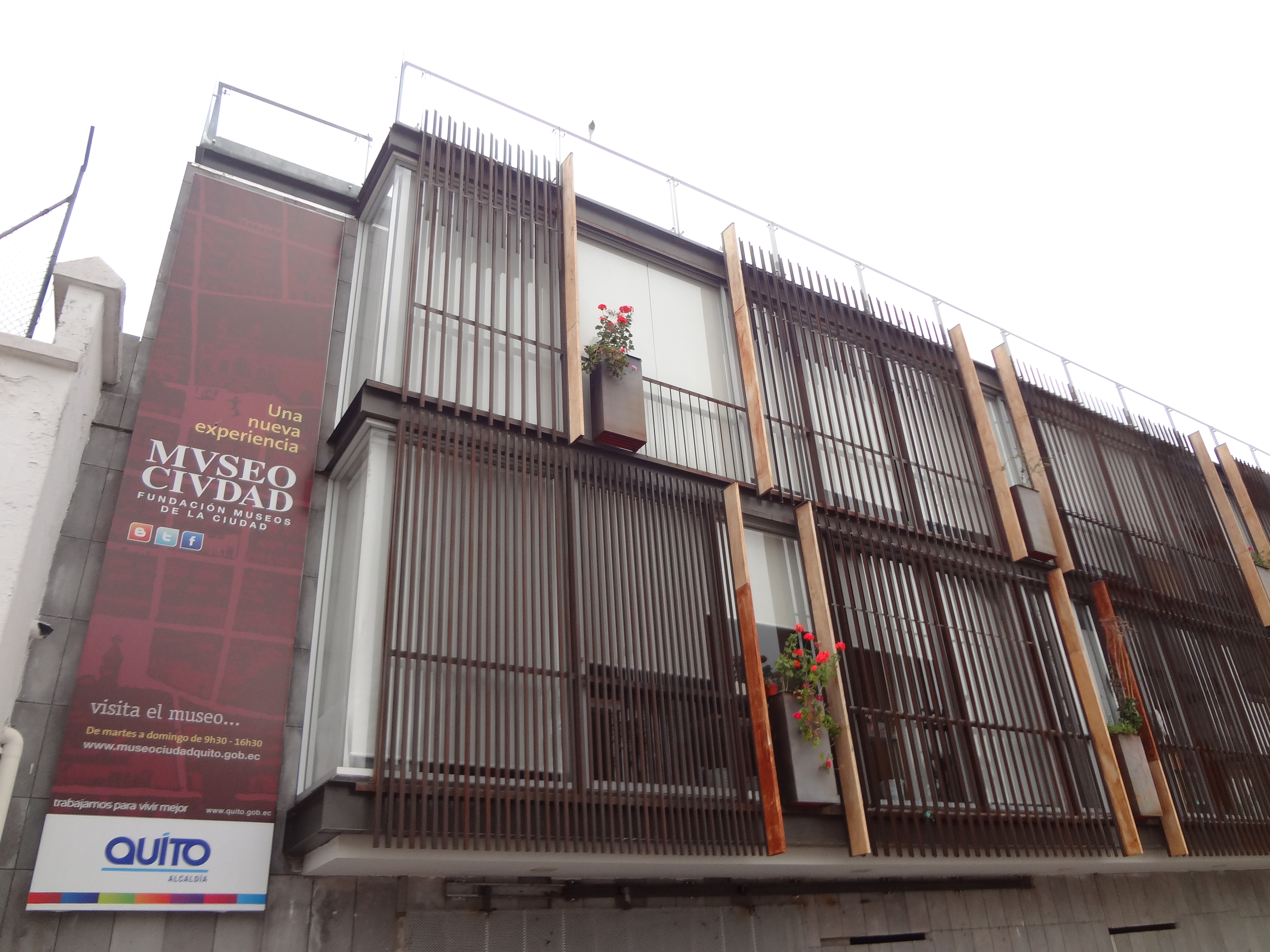
Museum exterior

The City Museum (Museo de la Ciudad) is a museum in the colonial center of Quito, Ecuador. It is located on Garcia Moreno Street, between Morales and Rocafuerte.

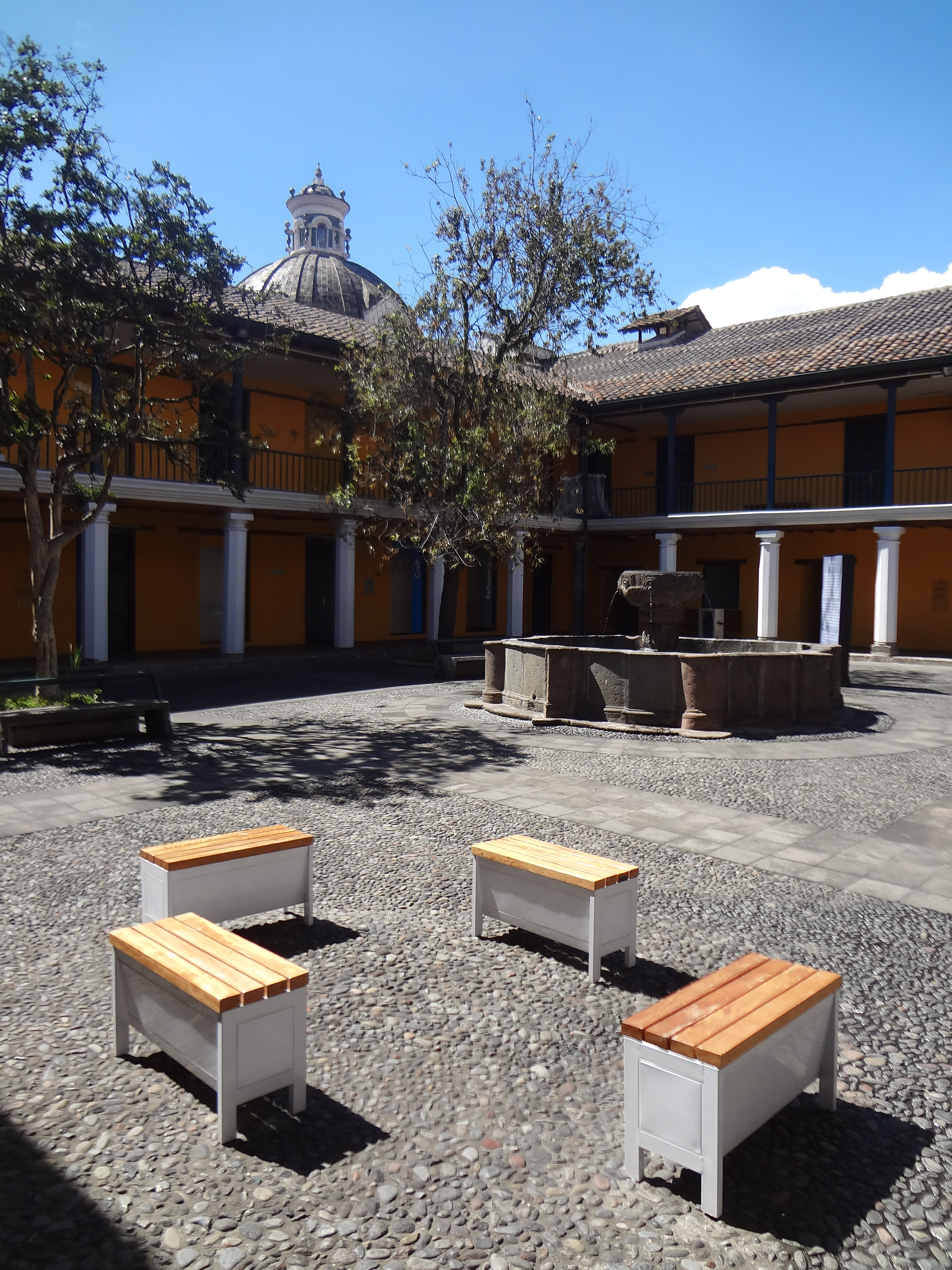
The City Museum was formerly San Juan de Dios Hospital

The museum was founded in 1998 and occupies the buildings of what once was the San Juan de Dios Hospital. The buildings were designated as a UNESCO Cultural World Heritage Site. and were restored in 1995 using the same materials as the original buildings to repair damaged areas. Ancient stone Doric columns, stone doorways and stone coverings in the patios are a highlight of the architecture.

The museum chronicles the history of Quito, along with 400 years of the history of the hospital. The former hospital buildings include an area of 10,200 square meters which house the four museum collections, 10 exhibition halls, workshop areas and museum offices, arranged around four courtyards. In addition to its permanent collections, the museum also offers the temporary exhibitions, focusing on particular aspects of life in Quito.

In July 2020, a collection of 69 artifacts were privately restituted to Ecuador to be displayed and appreciated at the museum. The objects were first taken from Ecuador by a London diplomat in the 1960s who was an art and archaeology enthusiast. The objects in his collection include Catholic icons from the era of the Spanish conquest and objects thought to date to the Pre-Columbian era.

One of the permanent exhibitions offers a journey through the customs, people and traditions of Quito, through its displayed history from the sixteenth century to the nineteenth century. Another is the display of the history of the hospital and a collection of items from a former doctor at the hospital. There is another permanent exhibit which is called "A new social order breaks through: Quito nineteenth century".

The museum is open Tuesday to Sunday, from 09:30 until 17:30. Admission is free for people with disabilities, certain institutions and municipal employees. Admission for the general public requires minimal fees.

== Photo gallery ==
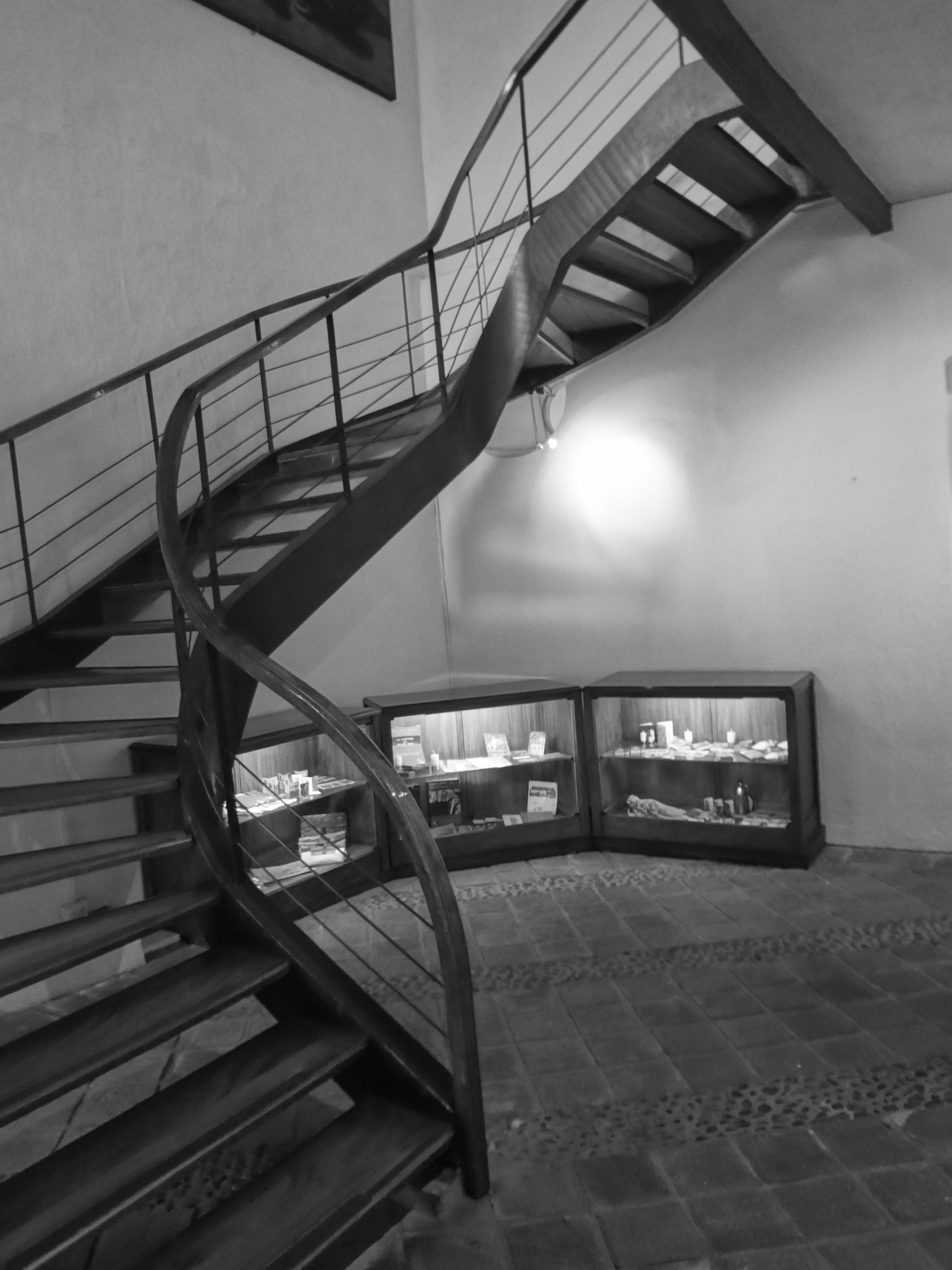
City Museum formerly San Juan de Dios Hospital

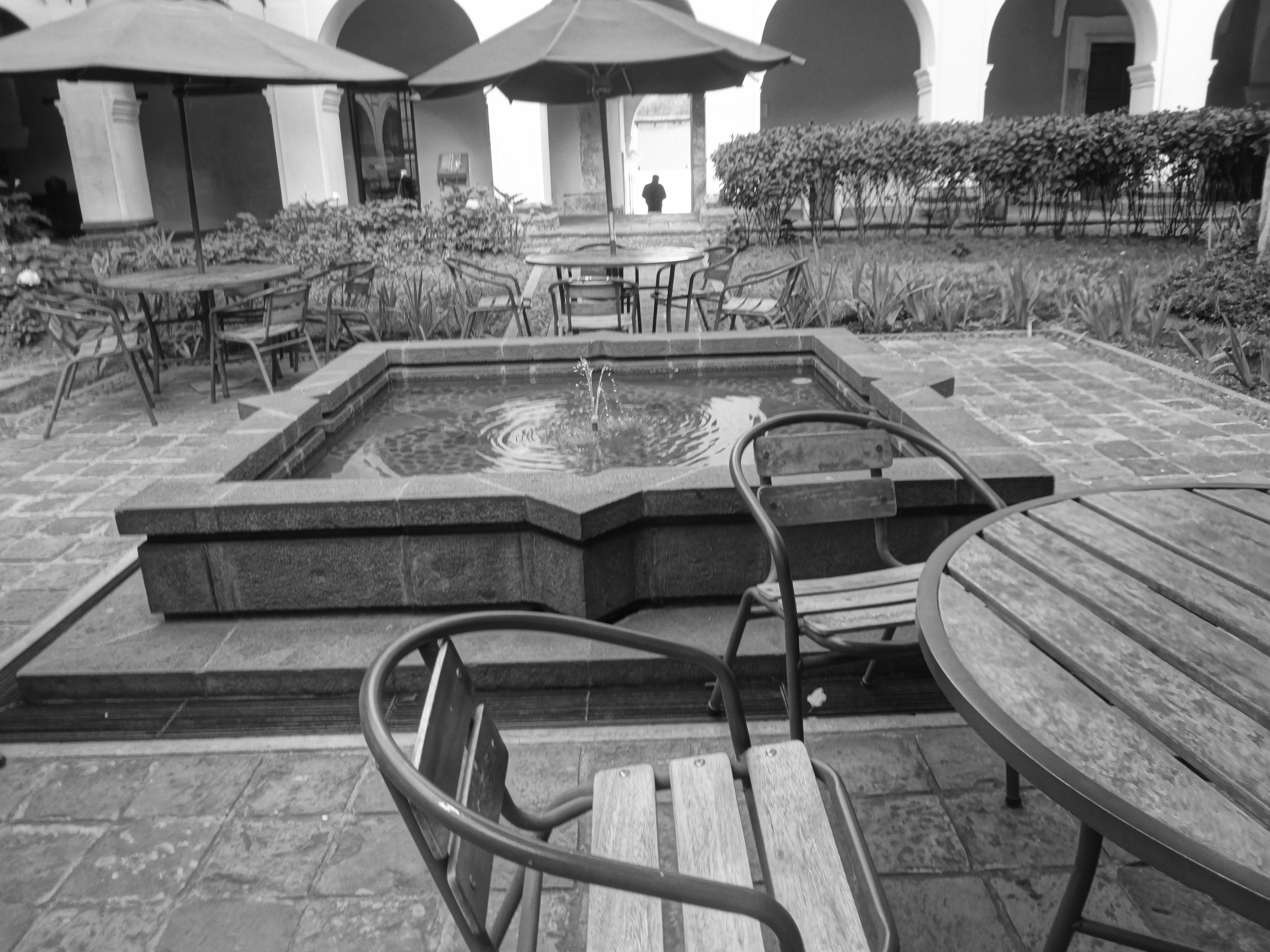
City Museum formerly San Juan de Dios Hospital

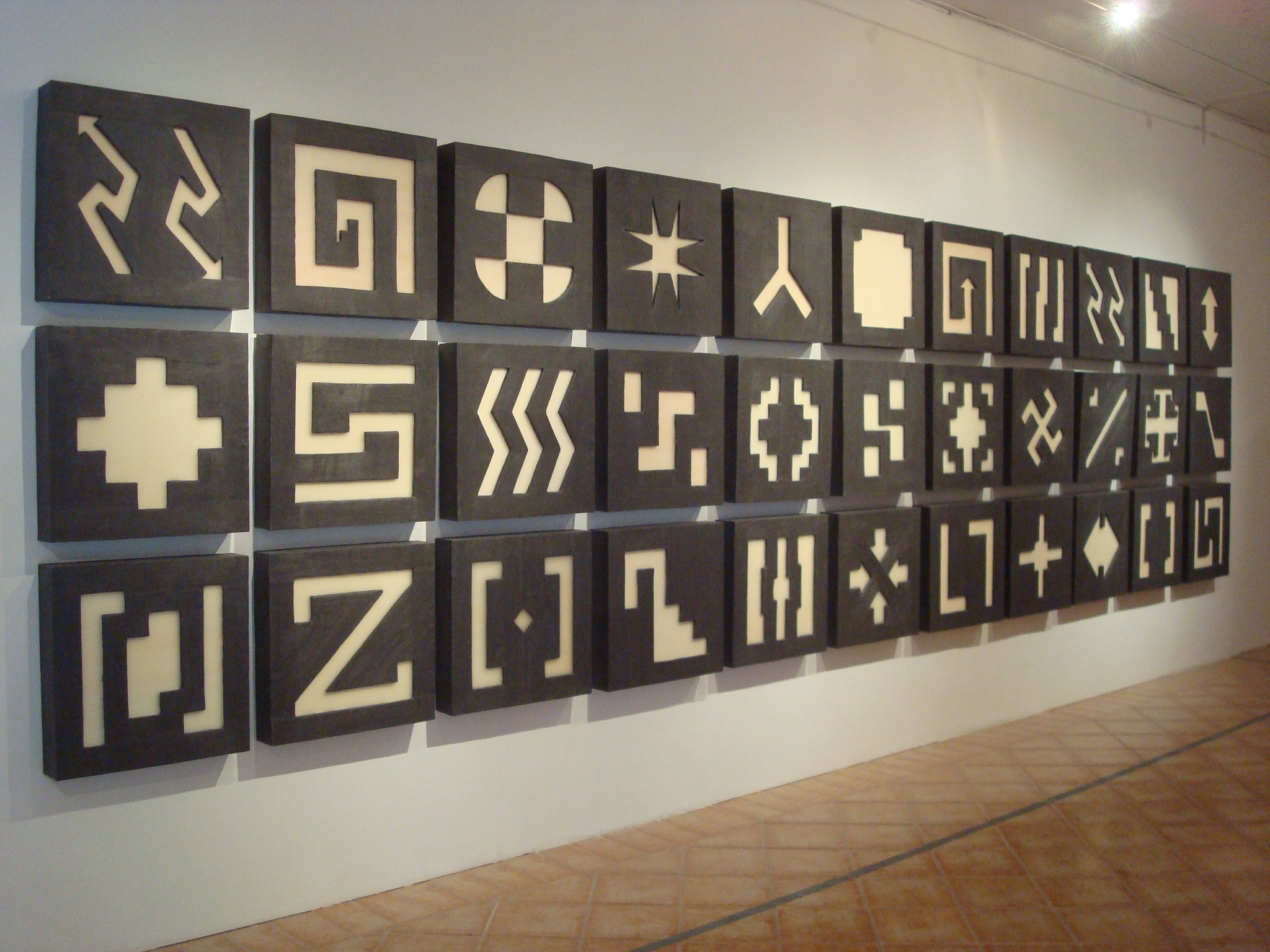
"Semiótica andina" Amaru Cholango. Installation at the City Museum, Quito, 2011

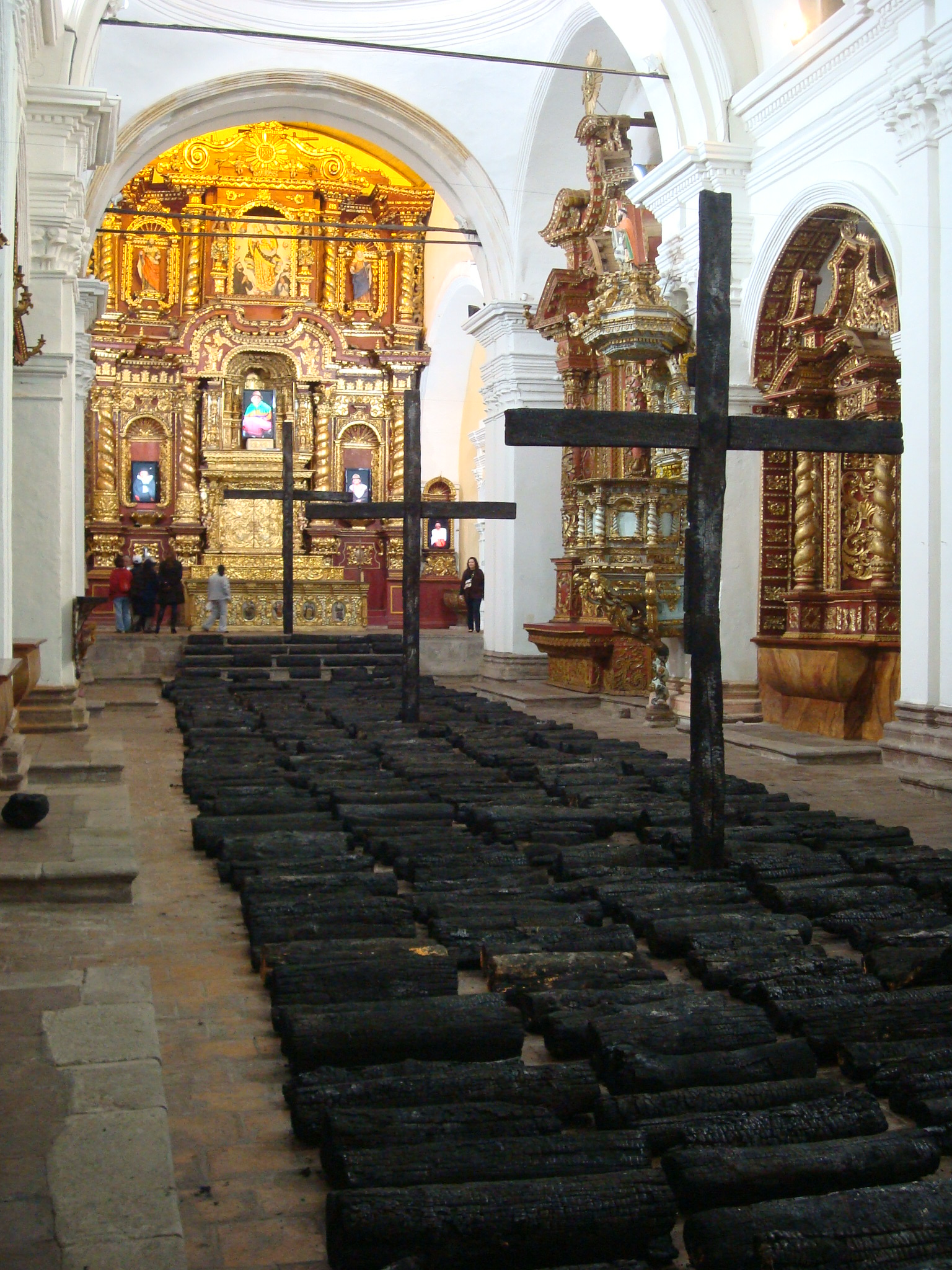
"Yo soy un árbol y tú también" Amaru Cholango. Installation at the City Museum, Quito, 2011
