= List of hospitals in Ecuador =

The List of hospitals in Ecuador are shown below:

- Hospital Carlos Andrade Marín
- San Juan de Dios Hospital (Quito), 1565–1974
