= San Juan de Dios Hospital (Quito) =

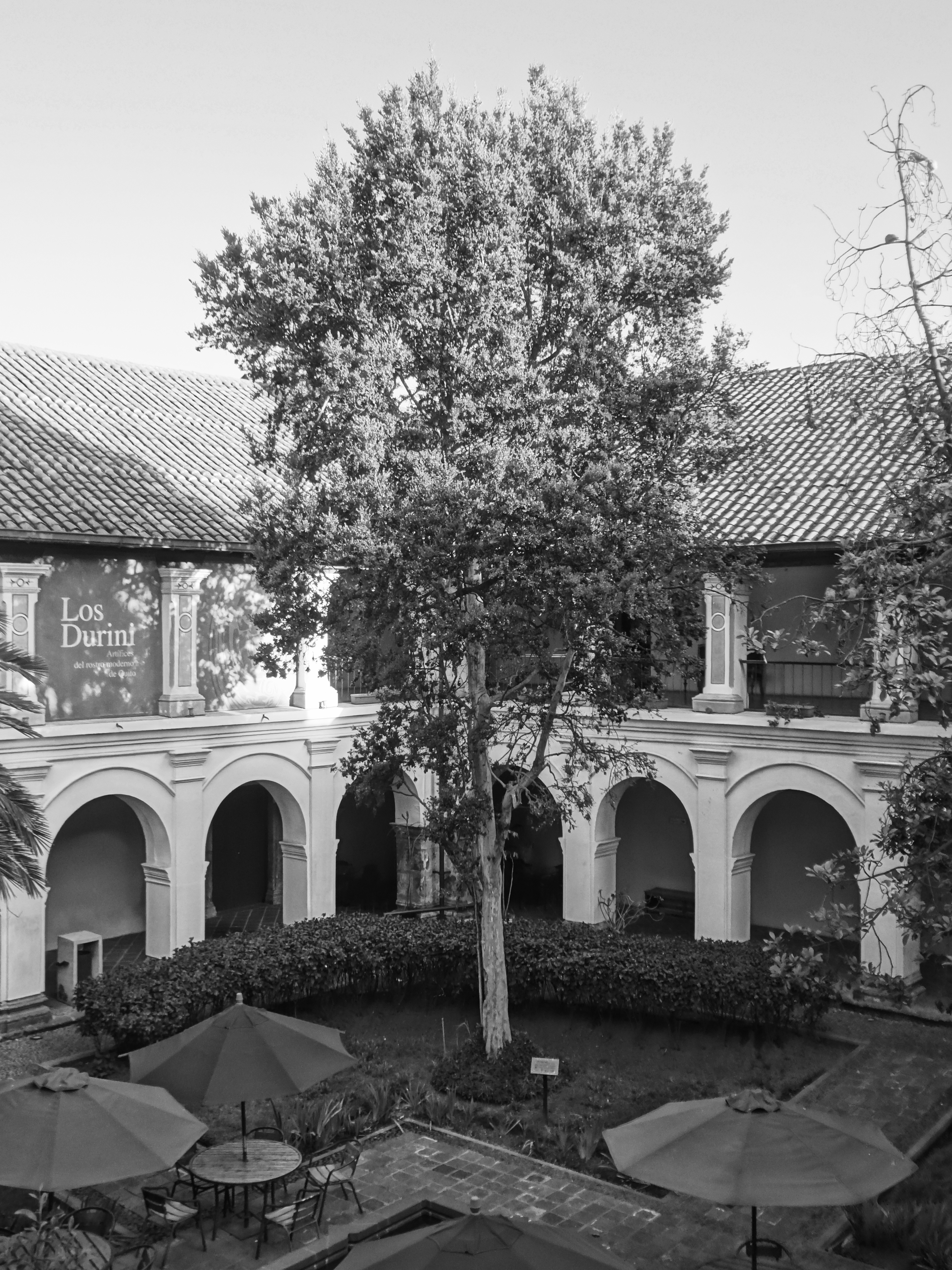

Geography
- Location: Ecuador

History
- Founded: 1565
- Closed: 1974

Links
- Lists: Hospitals in Ecuador

San Juan de Dios Hospital was a hospital located in Quito, Ecuador. It was the first hospital founded in the city and was open from 1565 to 1974. It has been designated a UNESCO Cultural World Heritage Site. Since 1998, the building which housed the hospital has served as the City Museum of Quito and maintains a small permanent collection relating to the history of the hospital.

== History ==
In 1565, Philip II of Spain ordered the construction of the hospital, 31 years after the founding of Quito. The king specifically ordered that people who lived around the hospital, whether born in Ecuador or in Spain were to be treated, but specifically the army which protected his colony was to receive service from the hospital.

The original name, The Holy Mercy Hospital of Our Lord Jesus Christ was run by the Dominican Order of the Brotherhood of Charity and Mercy from its founding until 1705. In 1693, the Dominicans created the medical chair of San Juan de Dios to study how to combine scientific methods developed in Europe with traditional medical practices of indigenous Ecuadorians.

In 1706 the administration of the hospital passed to the Bethlehem Brothers, who continued the research of the Dominicans. Two of the pioneering researchers at the hospital were Luis Chusig and Pedro Leiva. Chusig, an indigenous Ecuadorian who had to change his name to Eugenio Espejo to study medicine, discovered that many diseases were caused by microorganisms long before Pasteur's discoveries. Doctor Pedro Leiva revealed that the cure for malaria was contained in the bark of the cinchona tree.

The Bethlehem Brothers ran the hospital until 1830, whereafter the administration was assumed by the state. The Ecuadorian government with support of the Sisters of Charity managed the hospital until its closure.

The hospital also operated as a hospice, maternity clinic, and pediatric center, also nursing people with sexually transmitted infections and skin diseases. Patients were attended by "herbalists, shamans, healers, doctors, barbers, blood letters, Sisters of Charity, nurses, technologists, social workers and friars". The hospital ran a nursing home which was located in the oldest civil building in Quito.

Étienne Gayraud and Dominique Domec, French surgeons at the faculty of medicine in Montpellier, set out in 1873 on a mission to establish a modern medical school in Quito at the request of President Gabriel García Moreno. They had an anatomy amphitheatre built and created the Chair of Anatomy and Dissection at the San Juan de Dios Hospital. Étienne Gayraud and Dominique Domec compiled their medical and surgical observations made in Quito in a book entitled La Capitale de l’Équateur au point de vue médico-chirurgical (The Capital of Ecuador from a Medical and Surgical Perspective), published in 1886 (after Dominique Domec’s death) and reissued in 2013.

San Juan de Dios Hospital closed its doors in 1974 after 409 years of continuous service. The buildings, which had been designated as a UNESCO Cultural World Heritage Site became the City Museum in 1998. The Museum houses as part of its permanent collections the historical records of the hospital.

== Photo gallery ==
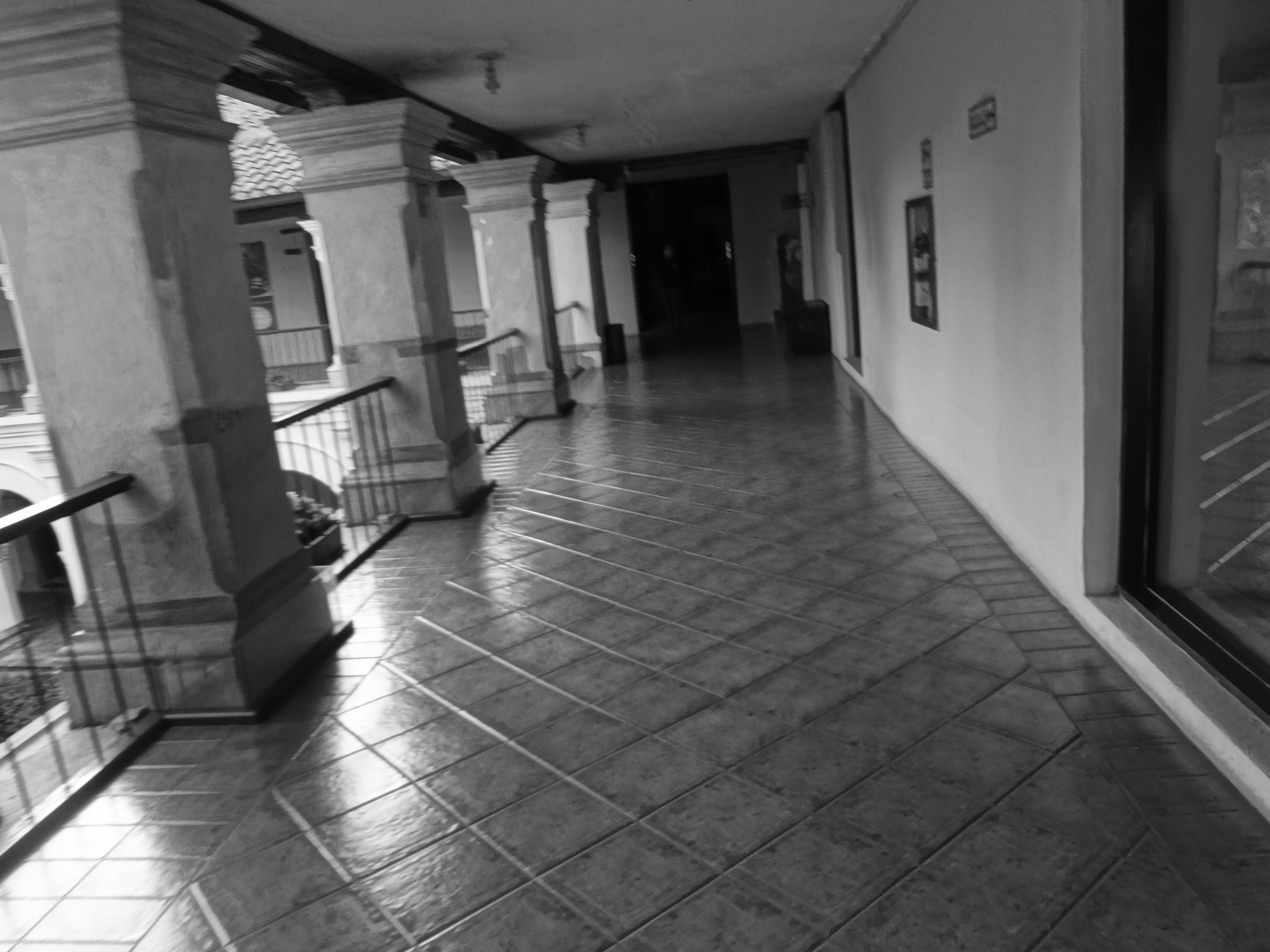
City Museum formerly San Juan de Dios Hospital

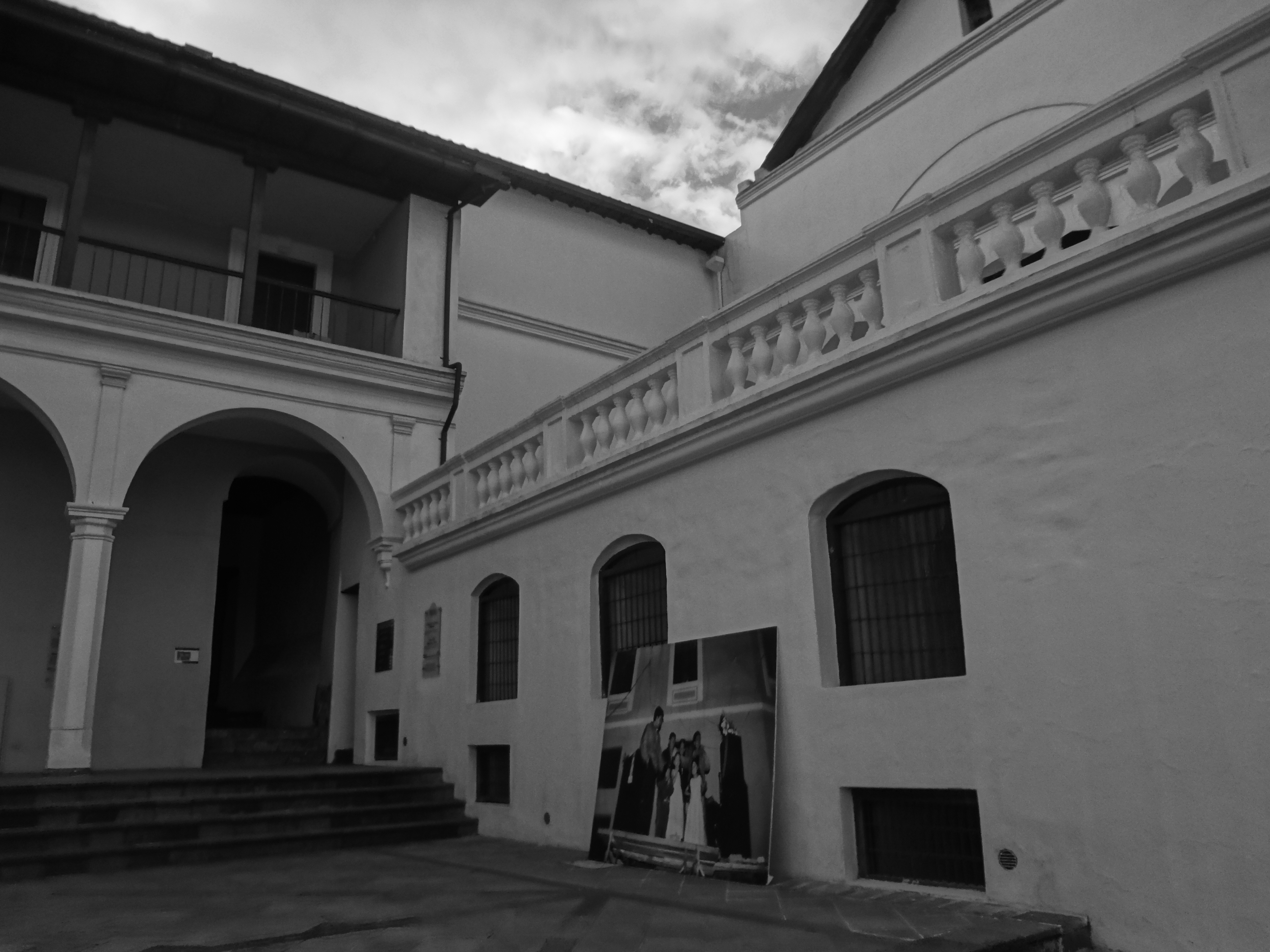
City Museum formerly San Juan de Dios Hospital

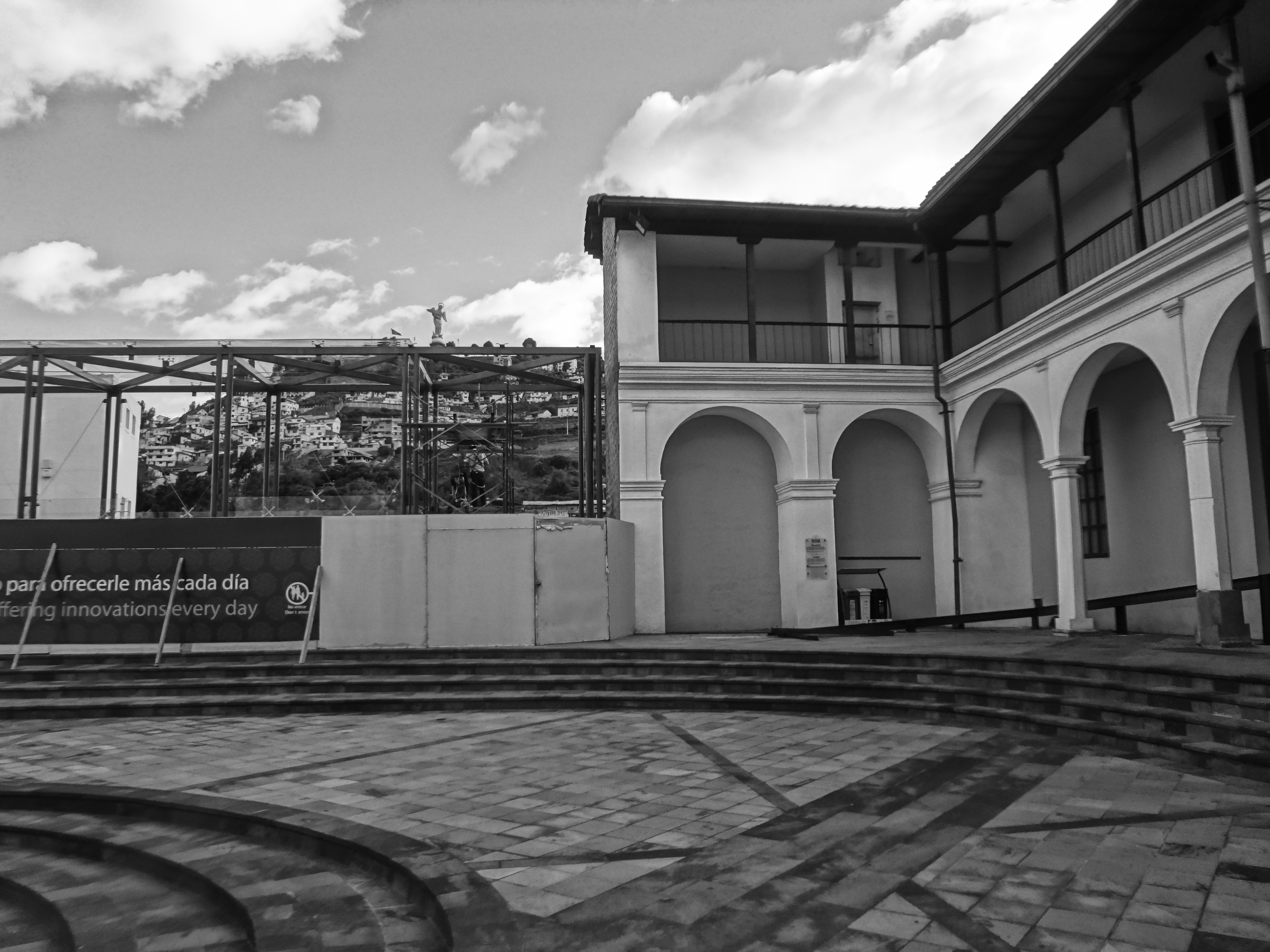
City Museum formerly San Juan de Dios Hospital
