= HaMerotz LaMillion 6 =

Season of television series

- Season 6
- Presented by: Ron Shahar
- No. of teams: 12
- Winners: Evelin & Tohar Haimovich
- No. of legs: 13
- Distance traveled: 55,000 km (34,000 mi)
- No. of episodes: 38 (42 including recaps)

Release
- Original network: Channel 2 (Episodes 1–3); Reshet 13 (Episodes 4–42)
- Original release: 21 October 2017 – 21 March 2018

Additional information
- Filming dates: 10 May – 7 June 2017; 22–23 September 2017

Series chronology
- ← Previous; Season 5 Next → Season 7

HaMerotz LaMillion 6 is the sixth season of HaMerotz LaMillion (Hebrew: המירוץ למיליון, lit. The Race to the Million), an Israeli reality competition show based on the American series The Amazing Race. It featured 12 teams of two with a pre-existing relationship in a race around the world to win ₪1,000,000. Starting in Tzukei Yam, racers traveled through Israel, the United States, Mexico, Colombia, Jamaica, Russia, Kyrgyzstan, and Thailand before returning to Israel and finishing in Jerusalem.

This season premiered on 21 October 2017 on Channel 2 until 1 November 2017 when the show moved to Reshet 13, one of two new stations launched following a split of Channel 2, with the finale on 17 March 2018 and was hosted by Ron Shahar.

Married parents Evelin and Tohar Haimovich were the winners of this season, while models Daniel Peretz and Eliyahu Shabtai finished second, and married parents Regev and Helen Hod finished third.

== Production ==
=== Development and filming ===
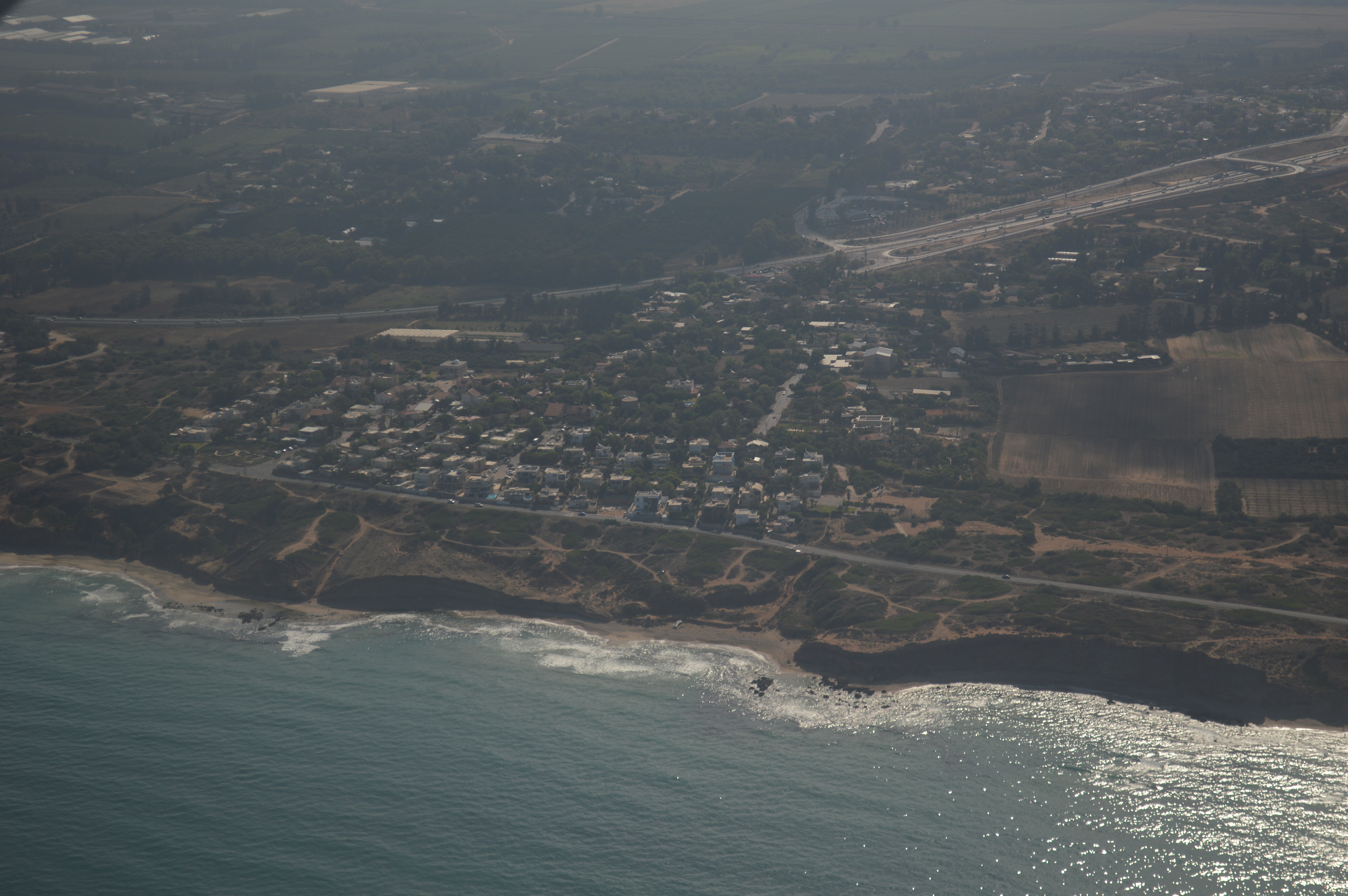
The sea cliffs of Tzukei Yam overlooking the Mediterranean Sea were the Starting Line for the sixth season of HaMerotz LaMillion.

Unlike the previous two seasons, which featured 14 teams split into two groups of seven teams and eliminated one team per group at the end of the first leg, this season's first leg returned to a single leg format.

This season visited four continents and eight countries including the first visit by an Amazing Race franchise to Kyrgyzstan, a country which has not been visited by the original American edition. The show also featured a special episode in the ninth country of Greece, where eliminated teams competed in challenges while sequestered.

Former New York Jets Flight Crew and The Amazing Race 27 contestant Krista DeBono was the Pit Stop greeter on Leg 2 in New York City.

For the first time in the show's history, the eliminated teams would receive a chance to return to the competition. After the conclusion of Leg 9, all the eliminated teams, with the exception of the team eliminated in Leg 1 and a team medically not cleared to compete, would compete in a leg with the winner being able to return to the competition.

Starting with this season, episodes began with a shortened intro that only featured the show's logo.

=== Marketing ===
Harel Group, Spring, Mobileye, and Partner Communications Company served as sponsors for this season.

== Cast ==
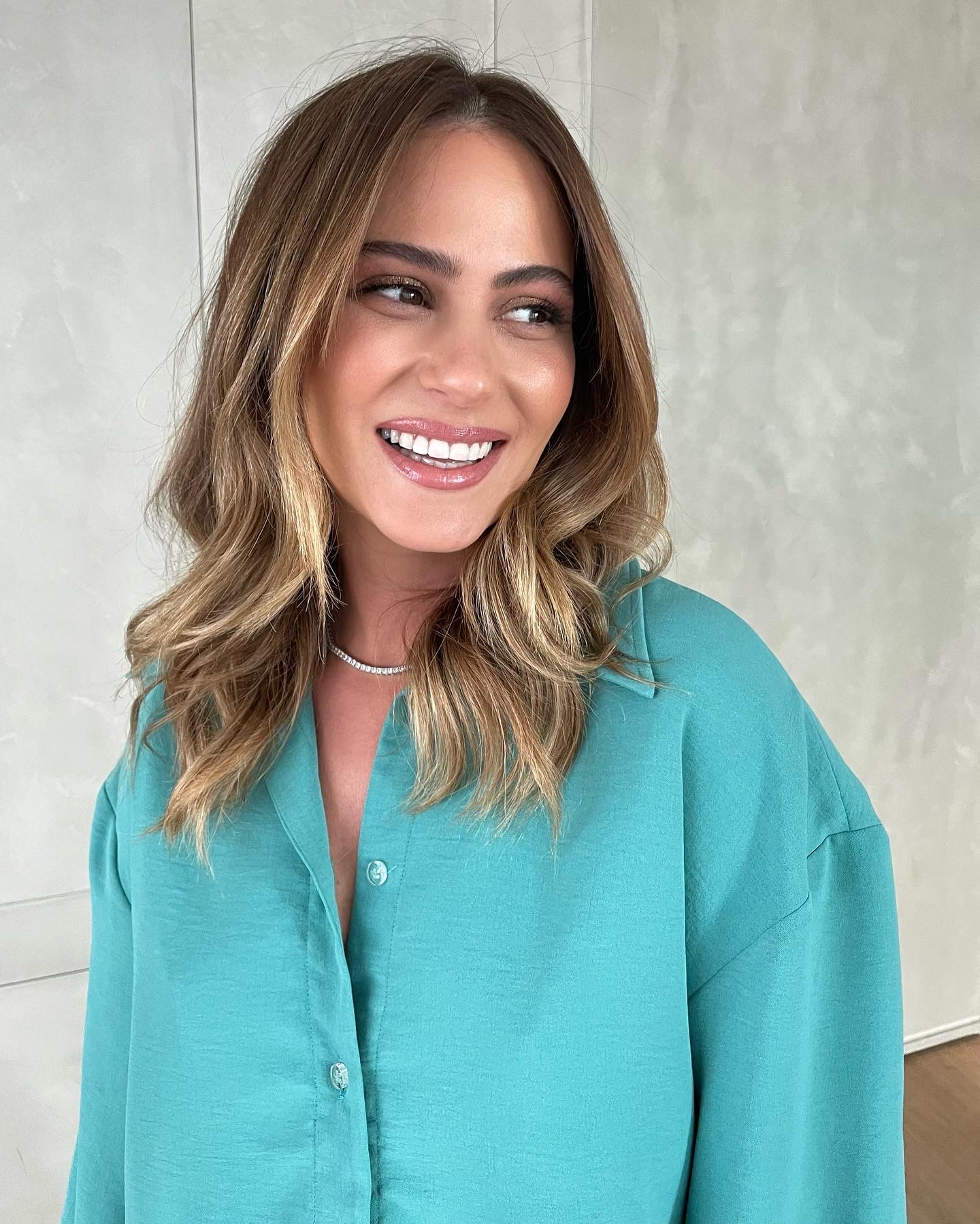
Mor Silver

The cast for this season included TLV - Doing Tel Aviv cast member Mor Silver and singer Regev Hod.

Contestants	Age	Relationship	Hometown	Status
Noa Martonovitch (נעה)	28	Cousins	Ramat Efal	Eliminated 1st (in Holon, Israel)
Ma'ayan Martonovitch (מעיין)	25	Cousins	Ramat Efal	Eliminated 1st (in Holon, Israel)
Asaf Gurfinkel (אסף)	(Returned to competition)			Eliminated 2nd (in New York City, United States)
Jessica Cohen (ג'סיכה)	(Returned to competition)			Eliminated 2nd (in New York City, United States)
Nimrod Haftel (נמרוד)	(Returned to competition)			Eliminated 3rd (in Honolulu, United States)
Yonatan Heifetz (יונתן)	(Returned to competition)			Eliminated 3rd (in Honolulu, United States)
Avivit Marsha (אביבית)	(Returned to competition)			Eliminated 4th (in Mexico City, Mexico)
Honey Yosef (הני)	(Returned to competition)			Eliminated 4th (in Mexico City, Mexico)
Yossi Mizrahi (יוסי)	(Returned to competition)			Eliminated 5th (in Toluca, Mexico)
Udi Avitan (אודי)	(Returned to competition)			Eliminated 5th (in Toluca, Mexico)
Mor Silver (מור)	32	New Mothers	Tel Aviv	Eliminated 6th (in Cartagena, Colombia)
Mor Swede (מור)	31	New Mothers	Tel Aviv	Eliminated 6th (in Cartagena, Colombia)
Meitar Asiss (מיתר)	(Returned to competition)			Eliminated 7th (in Moscow, Russia)
Adi Carmeli (עדי)	(Returned to competition)			Eliminated 7th (in Moscow, Russia)
Regev Hod (רגב)	(Returned to competition)			Eliminated 8th (in Tokmok, Kyrgyzstan)
Helen Hod (הלן)	(Returned to competition)			Eliminated 8th (in Tokmok, Kyrgyzstan)
Avivit Marsha (אביבית)	31	Parking Enforcement Officers	Holon	Eliminated 9th (in Jol Bulak, Kyrgyzstan)
Honey Yosef (הני)	29	Parking Enforcement Officers	Holon	Eliminated 9th (in Jol Bulak, Kyrgyzstan)
Asaf Gurfinkel (אסף)	26	Exes	Herzliya	Eliminated 10th (in Bishkek, Kyrgyzstan)
Jessica Cohen (ג'סיכה)	25	Exes	Herzliya	Eliminated 10th (in Bishkek, Kyrgyzstan)
Meitar Asiss (מיתר)	23	Childhood Friends	Rishon LeZion	Eliminated 11th (in Bishkek, Kyrgyzstan)
Adi Carmeli (עדי)	23	Childhood Friends	Rishon LeZion	Eliminated 11th (in Bishkek, Kyrgyzstan)
Yossi Mizrahi (יוסי)	40	Firefighter & Volunteer Policeman	Tiberias	Eliminated 12th (in Bishkek, Kyrgyzstan)
Udi Avitan (אודי)	40	Firefighter & Volunteer Policeman	Beit She'an	Eliminated 12th (in Bishkek, Kyrgyzstan)
Nimrod Haftel (נמרוד)	23	Pianists	Tel Aviv	Eliminated 13th (in Bishkek, Kyrgyzstan)
Yonatan Heifetz (יונתן)	23	Pianists	Karkur	Eliminated 13th (in Bishkek, Kyrgyzstan)
Yarden Vizel (ירדן)	23	Best Friends	Netanya	Eliminated 14th (in Lamphun, Thailand)
Anne Zivi (אן)	23	Best Friends	Givatayim	Eliminated 14th (in Lamphun, Thailand)
Omer Barazani (עומר)	25	Siblings	Jerusalem	Eliminated 15th (in Chiang Mai, Thailand)
Neta Barazani (נטע)	18	Siblings	Jerusalem	Eliminated 15th (in Chiang Mai, Thailand)
Regev Hod (רגב)	37	Married Parents	Rehovot	Third Place
Helen Hod (הלן)	29	Married Parents	Rehovot	Third Place
Daniel Peretz (דניאל)	23	Models	Tzafria	Second Place
Eliyahu Shabtai (אליהו)	26	Models	Rehovot	Second Place
Tohar Haimovich (טוהר)	35	Married Parents	Tel Aviv	Winners
Evelyn Haimovich (אוולין)	31	Married Parents	Tel Aviv	Winners

=== Future appearances ===
Anne & Yarden and Omer & Neta competed on HaMerotz LaMillion 8.

After this season, Neta Barazani appeared on the ninth season of the Israeli edition of Big Brother along with Season 2 contestant Adel Bespalov and Season 4 contestant Liron "Tiltil" Orfeli as part of a second wave of houseguests with a secret assignment in order to earn their way into the Big Brother house. Neta and "Tiltil" were unable to earn a spot in the house. In 2020, Regev Hod competed on the tenth season of the Israeli edition of Survivor. He was voted out on Day 30, lost a duel to get back into the game, and became the fourth member of the jury. In 2021, Omer Barazani competed on Big Brother VIP 4 and finished in third place.

== Results ==
The following teams participated in this season, with their relationships at the time of filming. Note that this table is not necessarily reflective of all content broadcast on television due to inclusion or exclusion of some data. Placements are listed in finishing order:

Team	Position (by leg)														Roadblocks performed
Team	1	2+	3+	4	5	6	7+	8	9+	10		11	12	13	Roadblocks performed
Evelin & Tohar	3rd	8th	9th	1st	1st»	6th>	3rd»	5th»	4th»			2nd	3rd	1st	Evelin 3, Tohar 3
Daniel & Eliyahu	11th	1st>	1st⊃	4th⊃	7th^{«}_{>}	4th<	2nd^{«}_{>}	2nd^{«}_{>}	2nd^{«}_{>}			1st	1st	2nd	Daniel 4, Eliyahu 2
Regev & Helen	1st	7th<	2nd⊂	2nd⊂	6th^{<}_{»}	1st>	4th^{<}_{»}	3rd^{<}_{»}	5th>	1st	1stß	4th	2nd	3rd	Regev 3, Helen 3
Omer & Neta	10th	4th>	6th⊃	3rd	3rd	5th	6th	1st	1st>−			3rd	4th		Omer 3, Neta 3
Anne & Yarden	4th	9th>	5th	5th	5th	2nd	5th−	4th	3rd<			5th			Anne 3, Yarden 3
Adi & Meitar	2nd	2nd>	3rd⊃	7th⊃	4th>	3rd	1st>	6th>		2nd	3rd				Adi 3, Meitar, 3
Mor & Mor	6th	5th	7th	8th	2nd	7th>^{3}									Mor Si. 3, Mor Sw. 1
Yossi & Udi	8th	10th	4th	6th	8th					4th	4th^{5}				Yossi 2, Udi 1
Honey & Avivit	7th	6th−>	8th⊃−	9th⊃						6th^{4}					Honey 1, Avivit 1
Nimrod & Yonatan	5th	3rd>	10th⊃							5th	4th^{5}				Nimrod 0, Yonatan 1
Jessica & Asaf	9th	11th^{2}								3rd	2nd				Jessica 0, Asaf 0
Noa & Ma'ayan	12th^{1}														Noa 0, Ma'ayan 0

Key

- A red team placement means the team was eliminated.
- An orange + indicates that there was a Duel on this leg, while an orange − indicates the team that lost the Duel and received a 15-minute penalty.
- A yellow < or orange « indicates the team who received a Yield; > and » indicates that the team voted for the recipient.
- An underlined blue team placement indicates that the team was the last to arrive at a Pit Stop in a non-elimination leg.
- A brown ⊂ indicates the team who received a U-Turn; ⊃ indicates that the team voted for the recipient.
- A fuchsia ß indicates that a team was brought back into the competition after winning the Return Ticket.
- Italicized results indicate the position of the team at the midpoint of a two-episode leg.

Notes

1. Noa & Ma'ayan were not brought to the elimination villa in Greece and were not eligible to compete for the Return Ticket.
2. Jessica & Asaf initially arrived 10th, but they did not complete the United Nations Headquarters task, having arrived at the Pit Stop by chance. They were required to turn back and complete the additional task before being allowed to check in. Yossi & Udi checked in while Jessica & Asaf went back, dropping them to last place and resulting in their elimination.
3. While at the elimination villa, Mor & Mor were removed by the show's medical team due to an injury sustained by Mor Sw. during the competition and were not eligible to compete for the Return Ticket.
4. Honey & Avivit were the last team to arrive at the Tarihbaev Mamytzhan School and were eliminated in the middle part of the leg.
5. Nimrod & Yonatan and Yossi & Udi were unable to finish the leg because they decided to stop completing the final challenge after seeing three teams leave Panfilov Park, thus accepting a tied fourth-place finish.

=== Voting history ===
Teams may vote to choose either U-Turn or Yield. The team with the most votes received the U-Turn or Yield penalty, depending on the respective leg.

	Yield	U-Turn	U-Turn	Yield	Yield	Yield	Yield	Yield
Leg #	2	3	4	5	6	7	8	9
U-Turned/Yielded	Regev & Helen	Regev & Helen	Regev & Helen	Regev & Helen; Daniel & Eliyahu	Daniel & Eliyahu	Regev & Helen; Daniel & Eliyahu	Regev & Helen; Daniel & Eliyahu	Daniel & Eliyahu; Anne & Yarden
Result	6–2–1–1–1	5–2–1–1–1	3–2–1–1–1–1	2–2–1–1–1–1	3–2–1–1	2–2–1–1	2–2–1–1	2–2–1
Voter	Team's Vote							
Evelin & Tohar	Jessica & Asaf	Yossi & Udi	Omer & Neta	Daniel & Eliyahu	Daniel & Eliyahu	Daniel & Eliyahu	Daniel & Eliyahu	Daniel & Eliyahu
Daniel & Eliyahu	Regev & Helen	Regev & Helen	Regev & Helen	Regev & Helen	Regev & Helen	Regev & Helen	Regev & Helen	Anne & Yarden
Regev & Helen	Evelin & Tohar	Daniel & Eliyahu	Avivit & Honey	Daniel & Eliyahu	Daniel & Eliyahu	Daniel & Eliyahu	Daniel & Eliyahu	Daniel & Eliyahu
Omer & Neta	Regev & Helen	Regev & Helen	Mor & Mor	Evelin & Tohar	Anne & Yarden	Anne & Yarden	Anne & Yarden	Anne & Yarden
Anne & Yarden	Regev & Helen	Yossi & Udi	Yossi & Udi	Yossi & Udi	Omer & Neta	Omer & Neta	Omer & Neta	Omer & Neta
Adi & Meitar	Regev & Helen	Regev & Helen	Regev & Helen	Regev & Helen	Regev & Helen	Regev & Helen	Regev & Helen	
Mor & Mor	Honey & Avivit	Nimrod & Yonatan	Omer & Neta	Omer & Neta	Daniel & Eliyahu			
Yossi & Udi	Anne & Yarden	Anne & Yarden	Anne & Yarden	Anne & Yarden				
Honey & Avivit	Regev & Helen	Regev & Helen	Regev & Helen					
Nimrod & Yonatan	Regev & Helen	Regev & Helen						
Jessica & Asaf	Evelin & Tohar							

== Episode Titles ==
Translated from Hebrew from the official website:

1. Kickoff Event (אירוע ההזנקה) (Leg 1)
2. The Teams Land in New York (הזוגות נוחתים בניו יורק) (Leg 2)
3. The American Shake (השייק האמריקאי) (Leg 2)
4. Elimination in New York (הדחה בניו יורק) (Leg 2)
5. The Teams Land in Hawaii (הזוגות נוחתים בהוואי) (Leg 3)
6. The Teams Are Falling Apart (הזוגות מתפרקים) (Leg 3)
7. Elimination in Hawaii (הדחה בהוואי) (Leg 3)
8. Landing in Mexico (נוחתים במקסיקו) (Leg 4)
9. Suspended in the Air (תלויים באוויר) (Leg 4)
10. Elimination in Mexico (הדחה במקסיקו) (Leg 4)
11. The Pepper Task (משימת הפלפל) (Leg 5)
12. The Day of the Dead Task (משימת יום המתים) (Leg 5)
13. A Nerve-Racking Elimination Episode (פרק הדחה מורט עצבים) (Leg 5)
14. Landing in Colombia (נוחתים בקולומביה) (Leg 6)
15. Soaked in Emotion (ספוגים ברגשות) (Leg 6)
16. Elimination in Colombia (הדחה בקולומביה) (Leg 6)
17. Landing in Jamaica (נוחתים בג'מייקה) (Leg 7)
18. The Voodoo Task (משימת הוודו) (Leg 7)
19. A Beligerant Duel (דו קרב לוחמני) (Leg 7)
20. Elimination in Jamaica (הדחה בג'מייקה) (Leg 7)
21. The Teams Land in Russia (הזוגות נוחתים ברוסיה) (Leg 8)
22. The Oil Mission (משימת הנפט) (Leg 8)
23. The Russian Circus (הקרקס הרוסי) (Leg 8)
24. Elimination in Russia (הדחה ברוסיה) (Leg 8)
25. Landing in Kyrgyzstan (נוחתים בקירגיזסטן) (Leg 9)
26. The Great Exposure (החשיפה הגדולה) (Recap)
27. The Last Duel (הדו קרב האחרון) (Leg 9)
28. Drama in Kyrgyzstan (דרמה בקירגיסטן) (Leg 9)
29. The World is Turning Upside Down (העולם מתהפך) (Leg 9)
30. Elimination of Eliminations (הדחת ההדחות) (Leg 9)
31. The Rules Are Breaking (החוקים מתנפצים) (Elimination Villa)
32. War of the Eliminated (מלחמת המודחים) (Leg 10)
33. A Mission from Another World (משימה מעולם אחר) (Leg 10)
34. The Teams Exposed (הזוגות נחשפים) (Recap)
35. The Return Episode (פרק ההחזרה) (Leg 10)
36. Quarterfinal (רבע הגמר!) (Leg 11)
37. An Elimination Before the Semifinals (הדחה לפני חצי הגמר) (Leg 11)
38. Semifinals Part 1 (חצי הגמר חלק 1) (Leg 12)
39. Semifinals Part 2 (חצי הגמר חלק 2) (Leg 12)
40. Jumping into the Finals (מזנקים לגמר) (Recap)
41. Final Event (אירוע הגמר) (Leg 13)
42. Reunion (האיחוד) (Recap)

== Race summary ==
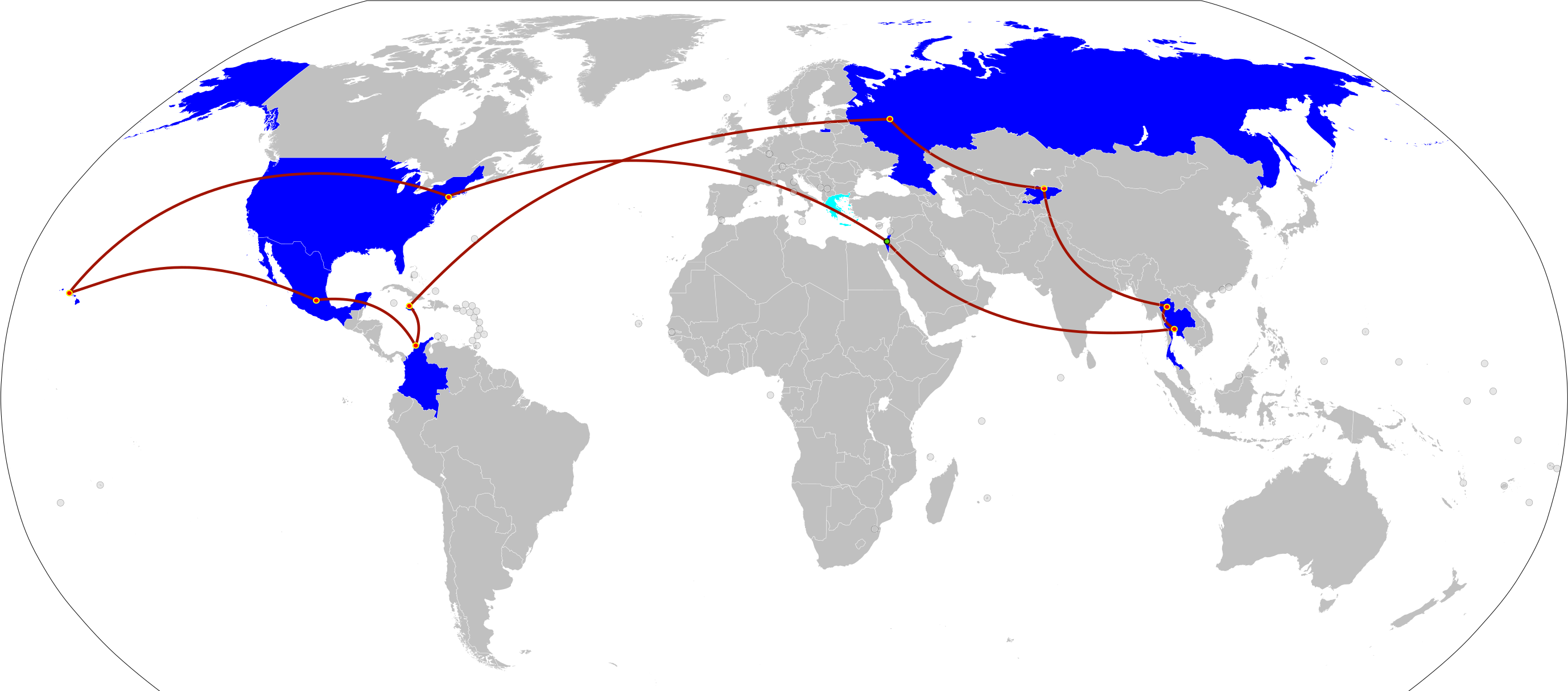
HaMerotz LaMillion 6 route map; light blue indicates the country was featured but not part of the racecourse; the green dot indicates the Starting Line and Finish Line

Destinations	Air travel Rail travel Water travel Bus travel Helicopter travel Bicycle travel Gondola travel
Route Markers	צומת (Detour) מחסום (Roadblock) דו–קרב (Duel) סיבוב פרסה (U-Turn) עצור (Yield) נקודת סיום (Pit Stop)

=== Leg 1 (Israel) ===
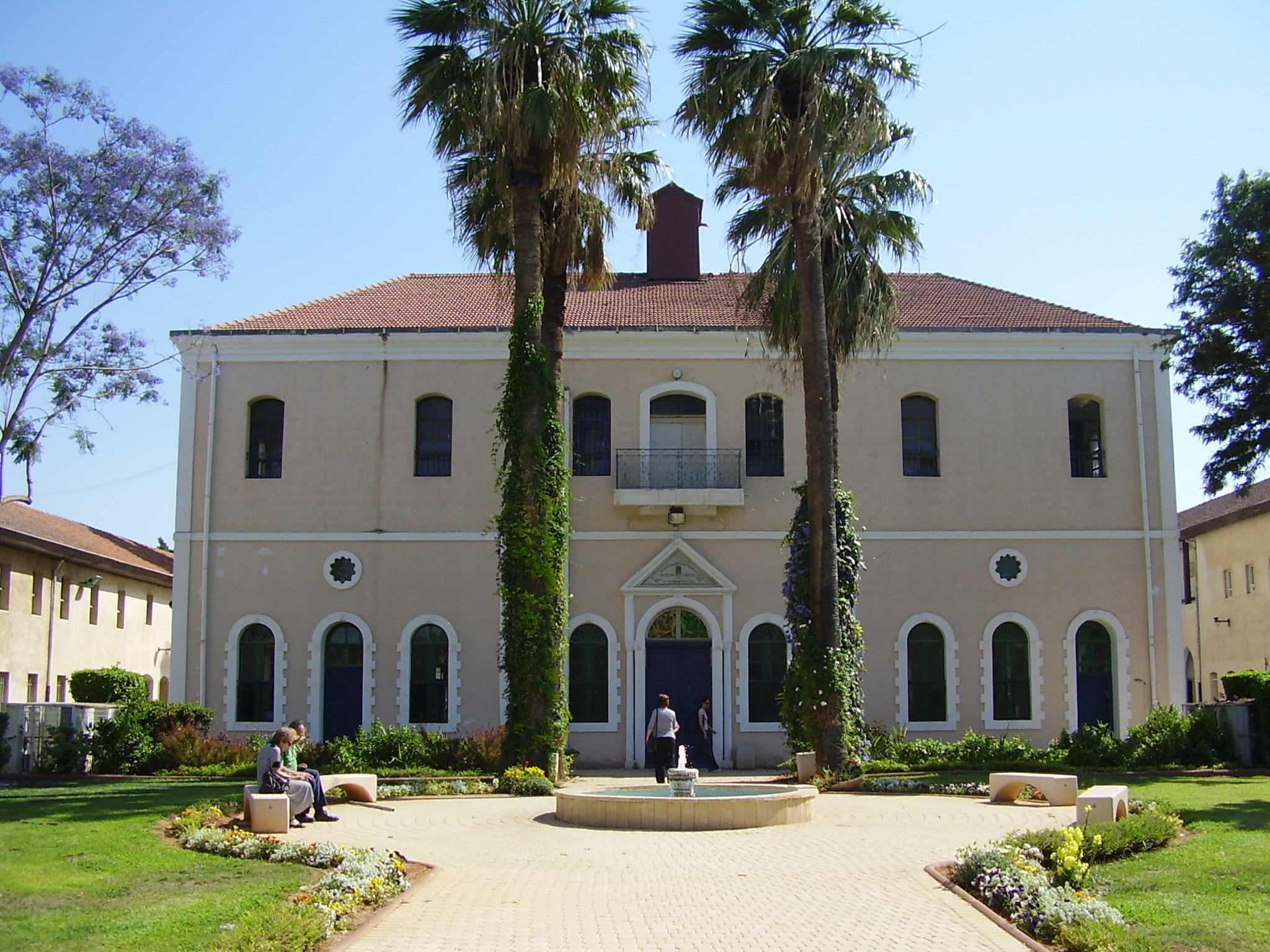
Synagogue of Mikveh Israel. The first Pit Stop of HaMerotz LaMillion 6.

Airdate: 21 October 2017

- Tzukei Yam, Israel (Sea Cliffs) (Starting Line)
- Netanya (Winter Lake Park)
- Netanya (IKEA)
- Central District (Kvutzat Yavne – Yavneh Food Products Group)
- Tel Aviv District (Mikveh Israel)

Additional tasks

- At Winter Lake Park, teams had to walk across an I-beam suspended high above the park, using a short length of rope to balance each other. Once across, they had to sit on the end of the beam and pick up a nearby metal lunchbox to have their photograph taken with it, recreating the famous Lunch atop a Skyscraper photograph.
- At the Netanya IKEA store, teams had to choose a display inside the store to memorize, then make their way to a matching display outside that was missing certain items. They then had to figure out and search the store for the items that the outdoor display was missing, and show them to a judge. If the items were correct, they received their next clue.
- At the Yavneh Food Products Group in Kvutzat Yavne, teams had to balance on opposite ends of a seesaw and had to make their way toward the middle to empty cups of olive oil into a bucket without either end touching the ground, otherwise they had to go back and try again. Once teams filled the bucket, they received their next clue.
- After receiving their clue, teams were directed to the Pit Stop, which was described as the Mikveh in the center of the country that has been teaching agriculture for almost 150 years, leaving them to figure out that this referred to the Mikveh Israel near Tel Aviv.

=== Leg 2 (Israel → United States) ===
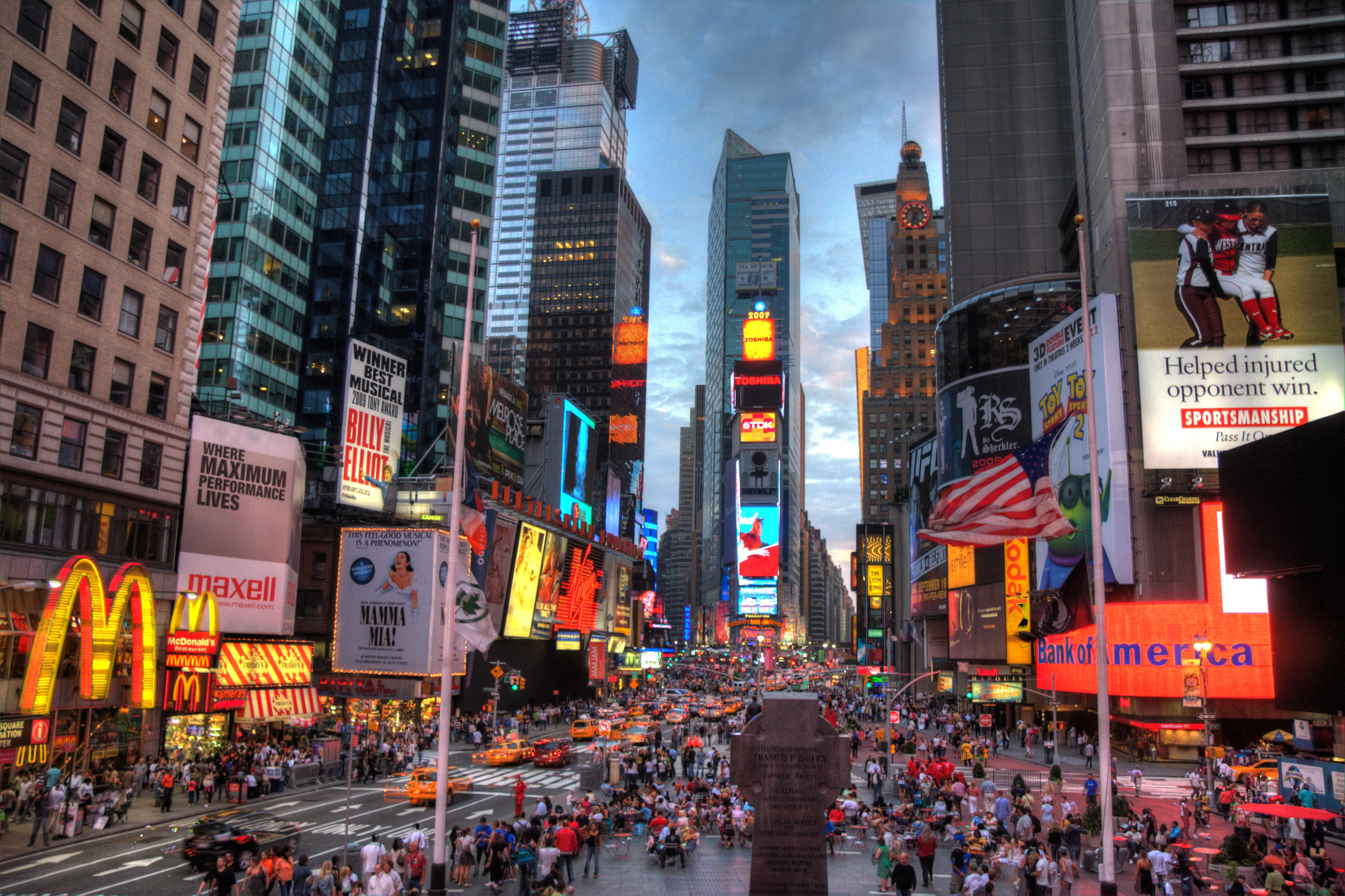
This leg in New York City mainly featured famous attractions around the borough of Manhattan, including Times Square, which hosted tasks and the Pit Stop.

Airdates: 25 & 28 October, 1 November 2017

- Tel Aviv (Ben Gurion Airport) to Newark, New Jersey, United States (Newark Liberty International Airport)
- New York City, New York (Central Park)
- New York City (Washington Square Park)
- New York City (Sunset Park – Industry City)
- New York City (Sunset Park – American Made Furniture)
- New York City (SoHo – Élan Flowers, Ari SoHo, Ground Support, Art + Autonomy Salon and 241 Centre Street)
- New York City (Times Square – LaLine)
- New York City (Upper West Side – Big Daddy's)
- New York City (Washington Heights – United Palace) (Overnight Rest)
- New York City (Louis Valentino, Jr. Park and Pier)
- New York City (United Nations Headquarters and Times Square – U.S. Armed Forces Recruiting Station)
- New York City (Times Square – Traffic Island at 7th Avenue and W 46th Street)

For this season's first Duel atop two adjacent rooftops in the Industry City complex, teams competed against each other in a tug of war match. The first team to pull the other off of their rooftop received their next clue. The team that fell would have to wait for the next opponent. The team that lost the final Duel had to wait out a 15-minute penalty. Teams made then their way to the nearby American Made Furniture outlet, where they voted for who they wished to Yield.

Additional tasks

- In Central Park, teams had to toss a ball resembling a big apple to land on top of a metal structure. They then to walk balancing the ball on the structure to a can, then tilt it so the ball rolls into the can to receive their next clue. If they dropped the ball, they had to start over.
- In Washington Square Park, teams had to convince enough park-goers to stand together on a weighing scale to reach a total weight within five kilograms of 1,636 kilograms (3,607 lb), the equivalent to one million Israeli new shekels in only five-shekel coins, to receive their next clue.
- Teams made their way back to Manhattan to collect a list of items at specific locations in the famous SoHo neighborhood: a flower bouquet and four gifts from Élan Flowers, ten suits from Ari SoHo, eight cups of coffee from Ground Support Café, and finally a set of golf clubs and a rolling suitcase from Art + Autonomy Salon. Once fully collected, they then had to deliver all of the items without dropping or breaking them to a Mr. Donald's loft at 241 Centre Street to receive their next clue.
- At the LaLine store in Times Square, teams had to carry a tray of a uniquely scented body cream around Times Square and convince passersby to apply the cream until a small Amazing Race flag was uncovered in one of the containers to receive their next clue.
- At Big Daddy's diner, teams were given a menu listing only the names of specials, including Million Dollar Baby, American Dream, etc. written in Hebrew, and had to find the signature dish by ordering off of the menu. If teams ordered incorrectly, when their order arrived, the server would then empty the food into a blender and purée it with water into a smoothie. Teams then had to drink the entire concoction, served in a single large glass with two straws and would order another dish. Once teams ordered the signature dish, they were then given a normal chocolate milkshake to finish to receive their next clue.
- At United Palace, teams would find out if they were Yielded. The next day, teams had to correctly perform a scene from the musical version of Peter Pan to receive their next clue. With one team member dressed as the titular character, and the other as Wendy, they watched the choreography on a video, then performed the scene on stage, with the team member playing Peter harnessed to "fly".
- At Louis Valentino, Jr. Park and Pier in Brooklyn, both team members dressed as the Statue of Liberty and had to catch five softballs in a net to receive their next clue from a person dressed as the Statue of Liberty.
- At the Manhattan headquarters of the United Nations, teams listened to the song "In Our Garden," which named multiple countries as well as Hawaii. They then had to make their way back to Times Square, find one person each from three of the listed places, and bring all three to a United Nations judge outside of the U.S. Armed Forces recruiting station, who would give them their next clue if they found the correct people by getting them to show their passport or identification and say "hello" in their native language as proof. They could then make their way to the nearby Pit Stop. The Yielded team had to wait out their 15-minute penalty before checking in.

=== Leg 3 (United States) ===
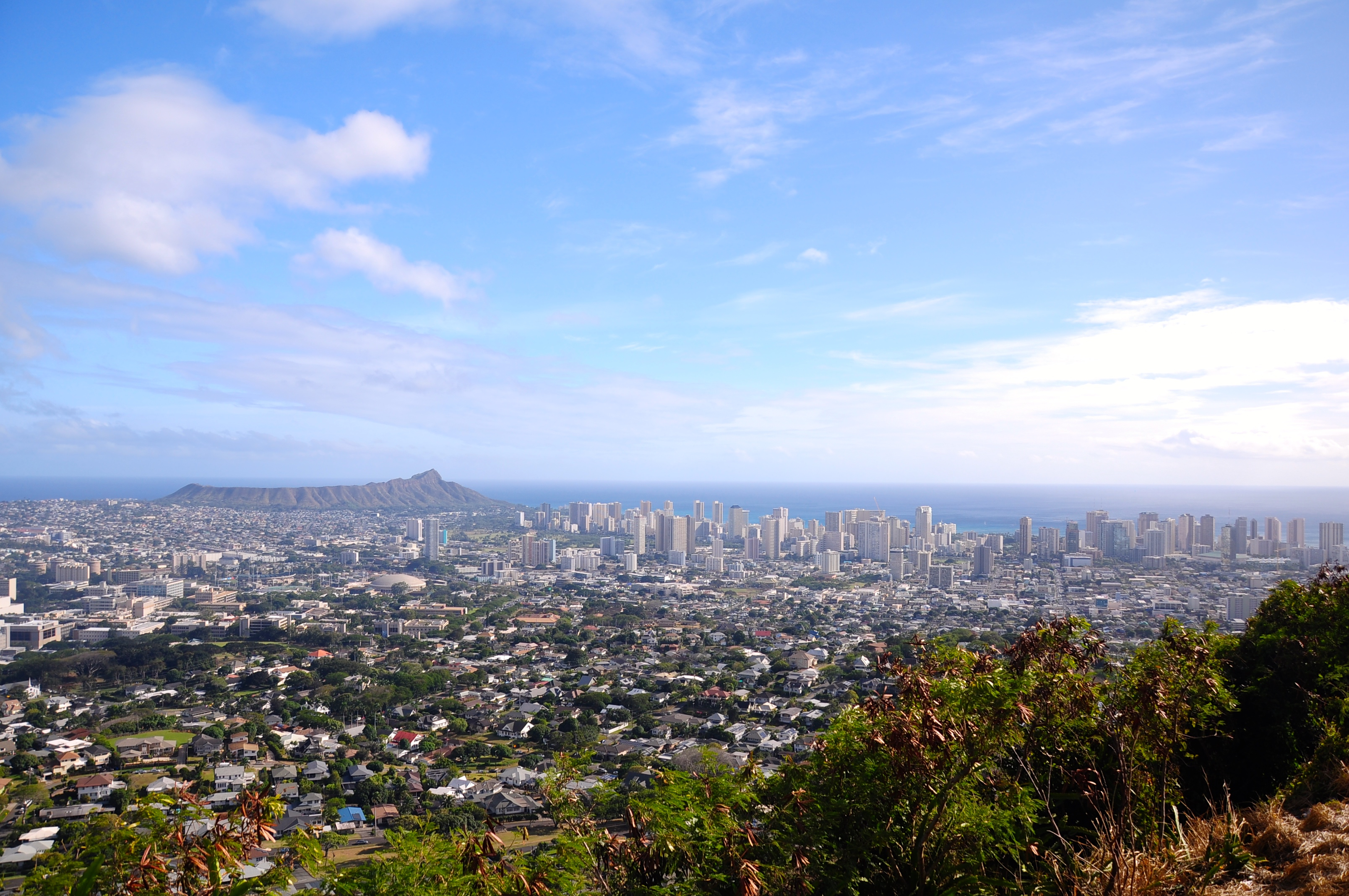
This leg took place on the island of Oahu and focused on the beaches in and around the Hawaiian state capital, Honolulu.

Airdates: 4, 8 & 11 November 2017

- New York City (Schermerhorn Street) (Pit Start)
- New York City (John F. Kennedy International Airport) to Honolulu, Oahu, Hawaii (Honolulu International Airport)
- Honolulu (Waikiki Beach)
- Honolulu (Sand Island Beach)
- Honolulu (Magic Island Lagoon)
- Hawaii Kai (Sandy Beach)
- Hakipuʻu Valley (Coral Kingdom Gate)
- Kaneohe (Papahana Kualoa)
- Hawaii Kai (Koko Marina Center – Bob's Hawaii Adventure) (Overnight Rest)
- Hawaii Kai (Koko Marina Center) and Maunalua Bay
- Honolulu (Skin Deep Tattoo and Piercing)
- Honolulu (Bailey's Antiques and Aloha Shirts)
- Honolulu (Waialae Beach Park)

For this leg's Duel, each team attempted to knock both members of the opposing team off while maintaining balance on a Saturn-shaped pool inflatable. After ten minutes, they could only hold on with one hand. The first team to have both members fall off lost the Duel, while the team still standing received their next clue. The team that lost the final Duel had to wait out a 15-minute penalty.

This season's first Detour was a choice between מעל החול (Over the Sand) or מתחת לחול (Under the Sand). In Over the Sand, teams had to pull a heavy stone across the sand using a rope and four logs, with teams having to move the log in the back to the front of the stone to keep it moving, and across a marked finish to receive their next clue. In Under the Sand, one team member had to become a human metal detector by wearing a helmet with a search coil attached while being held by their legs by their partner, who was wearing headphones. Teams had to search a roped-off area of the beach and find a metal plate shaped like a hand in the Shaka position among several metallic items to receive their next clue. Teams found the U-Turn reveal board near the beach's parking lot.

In this season's first Roadblock, one team member had to participate in the land surfing sport of heʻe hōlua. That person had to ride a wooden sled called a papa hōlua down a hill without falling over and grab one of several clues strung above the base of the hill. If they grabbed a clue with contained a paper saying "Try Again," they would have to slide down the hill again until they found a clue which contained a paper saying "Excellent Surfer" to receive their next clue.

Additional tasks

- At Waikiki Beach, teams dressed as mermaids, wearing a costume tail and a coconut bra. They had to crawl along the beach to find a bucket, then return to the starting point, where they would find a mermaid impersonator lying near an outrigger canoe. They then had to get a local to dump a bucket of water over each of them to wash off the sand, then pose with the mermaid for a photograph to receive their next clue.
- At the beach on Sand Island, teams voted for who they wished to U-Turn. Following this, one team member had to ride a Flyboard and manage to propel themselves high enough into the air to view a grid containing well-known icons of Hawaii on a board. They then had to relay to their partner, on shore, the missing icons to fill in on a corresponding grid to receive their next clue.
- Teams traveled to a fruit drink stand on Sandy Beach in Hawaii Kai, east of Honolulu, to receive a drink provided by ספרינג (Spring).
- At Papahana Kualoa, teams had to grab sweet potatoes wrapped in Aluminium foil cooking on a fire. Teams then had to walk barefoot across sharp rocks to a basket and peel every potato they obtained. Some of the potatoes cooking were purple sweet potatoes, and teams had to peel potatoes until they found 25 purple potatoes to receive their next clue.
- At the Koko Marina Center, one team member travelled by boat to the coral reef in Maunalua Bay, entered a BOBdive submersible, and would propel themselves to a metal frame containing several childhood photographs of the contestants. The chosen team member would have to find the six photographs that pictured their partner as a child. Once they believed they got all six photographs, they would return to the marina. If they were wrong, then their partner would have to search for the remaining photographs. Once teams found all six photographs, a person dressed as a shark would give them their next clue.
- At Skin Deep Tattoo and Piercing, teams would receive a temporary tattoo of a blank street map of Honolulu, with two red dots signifying the tattoo shop and the location of their next clue, on their backs. Teams had to ask locals what was tattooed on their backs and then make their way on foot to that location to find their next clue.
- At Bailey's Antiques and Aloha Shirts, teams had to search through over 15,000 Aloha shirts for the one shirt that matched the pattern provided to teams to receive their next clue.

=== Leg 4 (United States → Mexico) ===
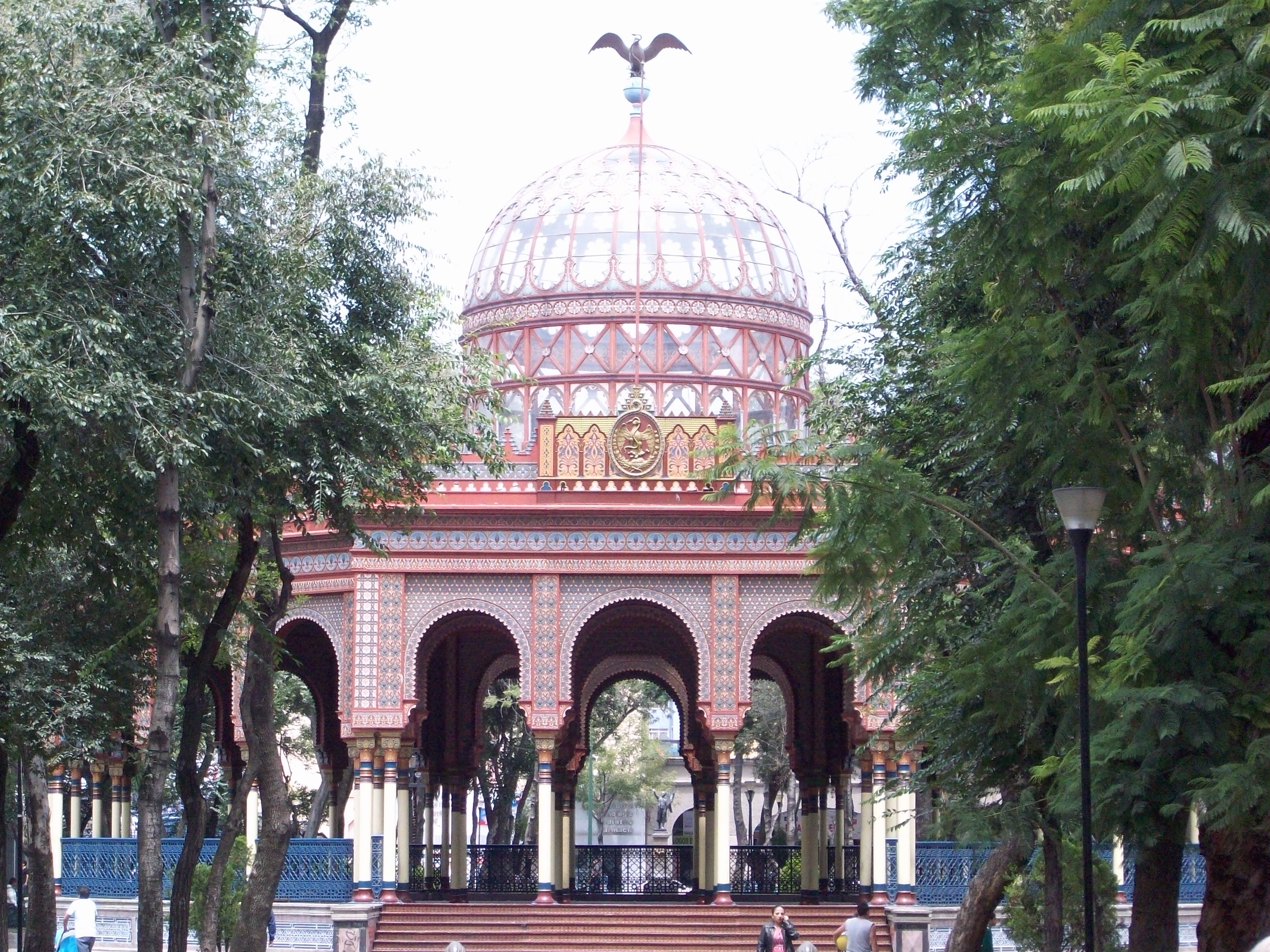
Teams ended this leg in Mexico City at the Kiosco Morisco.

Airdates: 15, 18 & 25 November 2017

- Honolulu (DoubleTree by Hilton Hotel Alana) (Pit Start)
- Honolulu (Honolulu International Airport) to Mexico City, Mexico (Mexico City International Airport)
- Mexico City (El Salón Tenampa)
- Tlalpan (Lienzo Charro Pedregal – Charros del Pedregal)
- Tlalpan (Lienzo Charro Pedregal – El Parián del Pedregal)
- Tlalpan (Lienzo Charro Pedregal – Charros del Pedregal Banquet Hall)
- Mexico City (Chapultepec Park) (Overnight Rest)
- Mexico City (National Museum of Anthropology)
- Xochimilco (Embarcadero Cuemanco Xochimilco and Xochimilco Park – Soccer Field)
- Mexico City (Rancho Aguaje 11)
- Mexico City (Jardin Fraccionamiento Los Sauces)
- Mexico City (Rancho Las Abejas 128)
- Mexico City (Biblioteca Vasconcelos)
- Mexico City (Plaza Garibaldi)
- Mexico City (Casa Gilardi and Calle General Antonio León 62)
- Mexico City (Alameda de Santa María – Kiosco Morisco)

In this leg's Roadblock, one team member had to join a group of performers called the Voladores de Papantla. That team member had to climb a 32-metre (105 ft) pole and swing around the pole while suspended upside-down on ropes to the ground. While swinging down the pole, the chosen team member had to spot a sign, which contained the phrase Mexico '70, referring to when Mexico hosted the 1970 FIFA World Cup and Israel's first appearance in a World Cup, in Hebrew. If they were able to correctly recite the phrase, then they would receive their next clue, otherwise they would have to go to the back of any line that formed, climb the pole, and perform the swing again until they spotted the sign.

This season's final Detour was a choice between פיניטה (Piñata) or מרגריטה (Margarita). In Piñata, teams had to choose a piñata and hang it on a rope atop a metal cube. One team member would be blindfolded and had to crack open the piñata through the verbal directions of their teammate, while two boys pulled on the rope to make it harder to hit the piñata, then find a candy with an Amazing Race-colored wrapper, which they could exchange for their next clue. In Margarita, teams had to use a prong attached to a long pole to stack a pyramid of ten margarita glasses filled with blue-colored water that was able to stand for five seconds to receive their next clue. After teams completed the Detour, they made their way to the U-Turn reveal board outside the house on Rancho Las Abejas 128.

Additional tasks

- At El Salón Tenampa, teams had to make a burrito and a tamale to receive their next clue while wearing a two-person Mexican poncho that required team members to work together using one arm each to prepare the dishes.
- In the riding ring of Charros del Pedregal, team members had to untangle a lasso rope from a metal hemisphere while tethered together within 15 minutes to receive their next clue.
- At the Parián garden, teams had to learn how to perform the Mexican Hat Dance to the judge's satisfaction to receive their next clue.
- Before leaving Lienzo Charro Pedregal, teams made their way to the banquet hall next to the Charros del Pedregal ring and voted for who they wished to U-Turn.
- At Embarcadero Cuemanco Xochimilco, teams had to board a local boat called a trajinera and use a long pole to propel their boat through the city's canals to a soccer field next to the Canal del Bordo within Xochimilco Park.
- At the soccer field in Xochimilco Park, team member had to put on vision obscuring goggles and pass a soccer ball to each other back and forth past a series of cones until they reached a net. Then, one team member had to shoot the ball at the net and score a goal to receive their next clue.
- After completing the soccer task, teams had to propel their trajinera back to Embarcadero Cuemanco Xochimilco.
- At Biblioteca Vasconcelos, teams made their way to a street typist outside the library, who would type out three pages of text with each page containing a verse of an Israeli song in Spanish that teams had to translate into Hebrew. Teams would have to ask locals for help with translating the texts. When teams translated the texts into Hebrew, they could enter the library. While inside the library, teams would have to notice that each page contained a number (0, 2, 3). Teams would have to unscramble the numbers and search the corresponding section of the library. Once teams found the correct section (230), they would find their next clue hidden among the books.
- At Plaza Garibaldi, teams made their way to a table containing four covered tanks with two Mariachi performers. The Mariachi band would play four songs, and after each song, teams would receive a question about the song they just heard: (1) How many times did the singer say "La Cucaracha?"; (2) How long (in seconds) is the second instrumental section?; (3) Question not shown; (4) How many instrumental pieces are in the song? After answering a question, teams had to open the corresponding numbered tank revealing either cockroaches, cow eyes, mealworms, or tarantulas. The correct number for each question was the number of items teams had to transfer to an empty corresponding tank on the other end of the plaza. Each team member had to transfer at least one of each item. After teams transferred the correct number of cockroaches, cow eyes, mealworms, and tarantulas to their appropriate tank, a Mariachi performer would hand them their next clue.
- At Casa Gilardi, teams had to use a rope and pulley to lift a metal plate revealing an image of the Frida Kahlo painting "Self Portrait Along the Border Line Between Mexico and the United States", memorize the image, travel on foot to a nearby studio, and place refrigerator magnets of missing details onto the correct spots of a nearly identical painting to receive their next clue.

=== Leg 5 (Mexico) ===
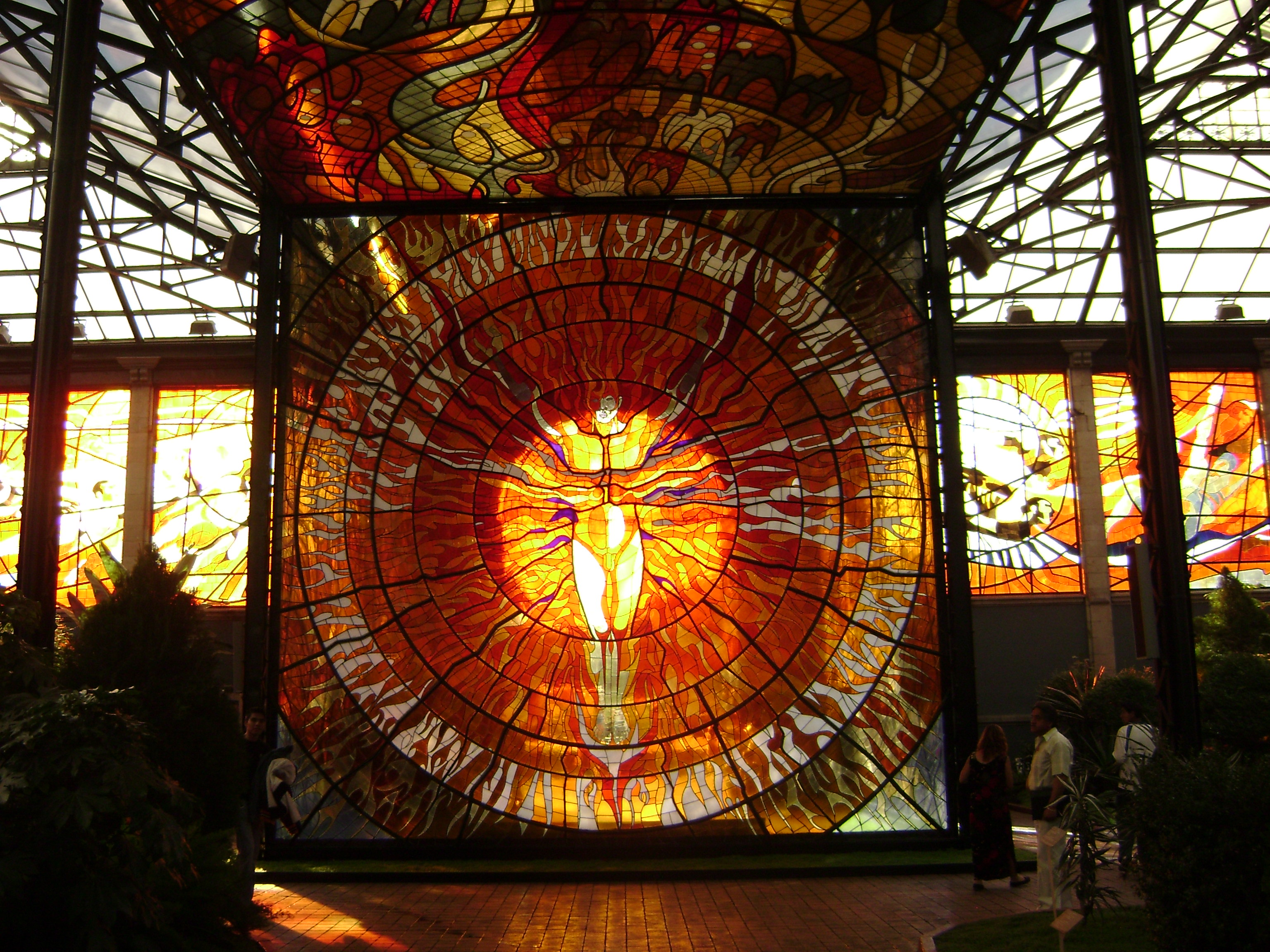
The botanical garden in Toluca served as the fifth Pit Stop.

Airdates: 29 November, 2 & 9 December 2017

- Mexico City (Hotel Royal Pedregal) (Pit Start)
- Palmar de Guadalupe (Octavio's Farm)
- Malinalco (Plaza Central)
- Ocoyoacac (Valle del Silencio)
- Mexico City (Plaza Cuicuilco Inbursa)
- Mexico City (Six Flags México)
- San Martín Centro (Francisco's Cactus Farm)
- San Juan Teotihuacán (Jardin de las Cactaceas)
- Temoaya (Centro Ceremonial Otomí)
- Toluca (Jardin Botanico Cosmovitral)

In this leg's Roadblock, one team member had to enter a tub containing a non-Newtonian mixture of water and corn starch. While stomping on the mixture to maintain the fluid's solidity, racers had to scrape ten corncobs one at a time against a rack of bare corncobs suspended above the tub and remove all the corn kernels from the cobs to receive their next clue.

Additional tasks

- At Octavio's Farm, one team member had to harvest an agave tequilana plant using traditional Jimador harvesting methods and remove the leaves using a curved machete and an axe while their partner held up a heavy harvested agave plant to receive their next clue. If the team member holding the agave became tired, teams were permitted to switch positions.
- At the distillery of Octavio's Farm, one team member had to transfer chopped and cooked agave to a barrel, where their partner had to stomp the agave with their feet in order to squeeze enough aguamiel to fill a cup and receive their next clue. Before leaving Octavio's Farm, teams walked to a nearby field with a fruit drink stand where they would receive a drink provided by ספרינג (Spring).
- At Plaza Central in Malinalco, teams had to sample 12 different chili peppers and arrange them in order from mildest to hottest according to the Scoville scale to receive their next clue. Before leaving Plaza Central, teams voted for who they wished to Yield.
- At Plaza Cuicuilco Inbursa, teams had to use a looped wire and liquid soap to form a soap bubble that they had to blow across the shopping mall and through a ring without popping the bubble to receive their next clue.
- At Six Flags México, teams made their way to the X-Flight bungee swing, where one team member would be harnessed to the ride along with a person dressed as a Day of the Dead skeleton. The team member on the ground would have to answer seven questions about their partner such as their partner's astrological sign, favorite television show, favorite holiday, favorite color, and what they did in the army based on the questionnaire team members answered before starting the season. If all the questions were answered correctly, the team would receive their next clue. Otherwise, if a question was answered incorrectly, the harnessed team member would plummet 57 m (187 ft) at speeds of up to 112 km/h (70 mph) and swing to the ground. The team would then have to wait out a 15-minute penalty before receiving their next clue. Before leaving Six Flags, teams would find out if they were Yielded at the entrance of the amusement park.
- At Francisco's Cactus Farm, one team member had to wear an outfit of 250 balloons resembling a rabbit and make their way through the field of cacti with their partner's guidance to a man dressed as a cactus, who would count the remaining balloons on the outfit. If teams were able to cross the cactus field with at least 125 intact balloons, then they could receive their next clue. If teams popped more than half of their balloons, then teams had to carry a balloon sculpture resembling a carrot through the cactus field again and would receive their clue if they were able to carry a carrot through the field with a least 33 balloons intact.
- At Jardin de las Cactaceas, teams had to recreate an image depicting a stone carving of an Aztec god with six large cubes using a provided photograph for reference to receive their next clue.
- At Centro Ceremonial Otomí, teams would find an equation written in Mayan hieroglyphs. To decipher the glyphs into numbers, teams had to make their way to the complex's stairs, where each step contained its corresponding numbered glyph. Once teams obtained the correct number and presented the corresponding glyph to the judge, they would receive their next clue directing them to the Pit Stop, where the Yielded teams would have to wait out a 15-minute penalty.

=== Leg 6 (Mexico → Colombia) ===
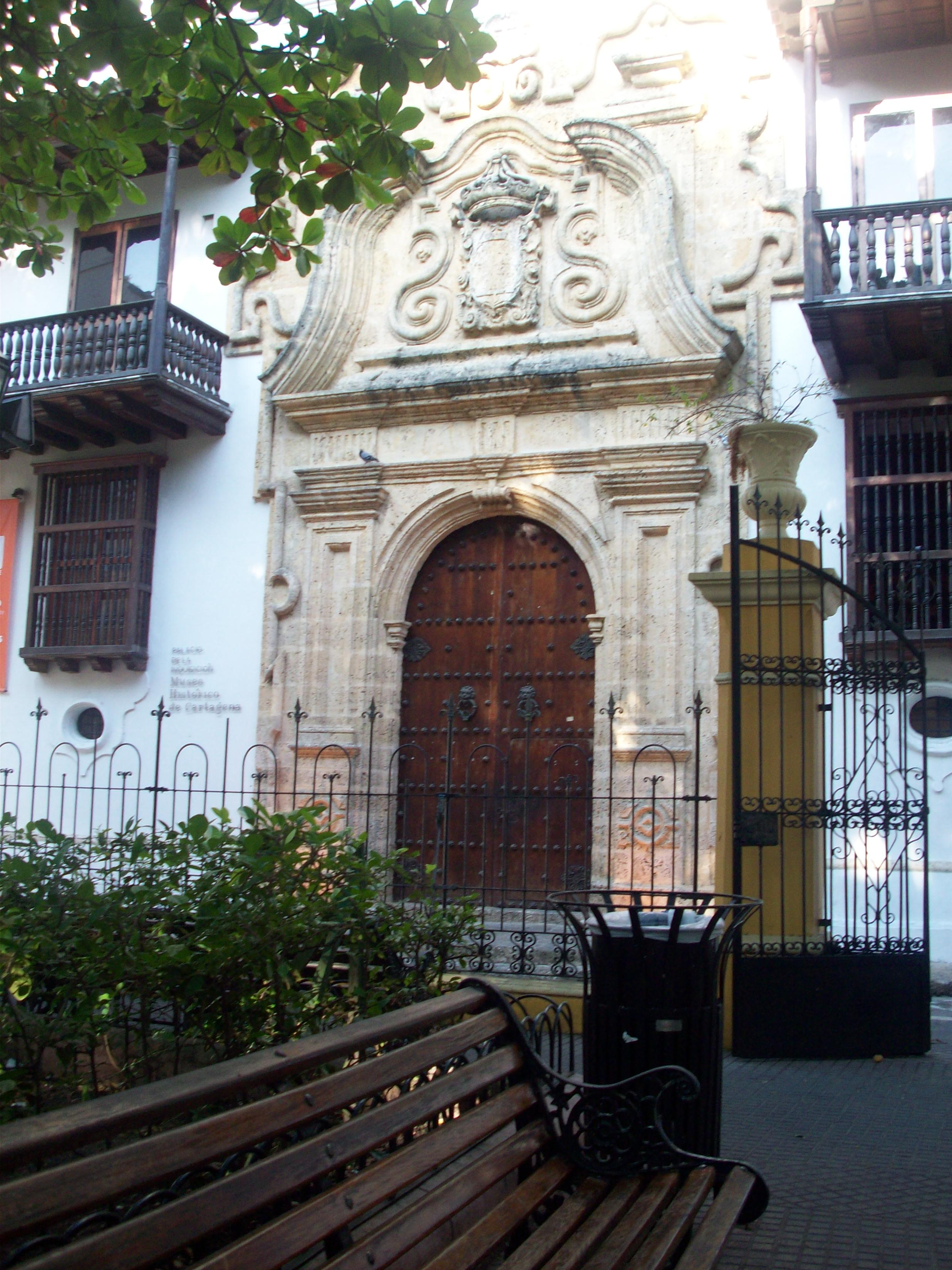
While in Cartagena, teams visited the Palace of Inquisition for this leg.

Airdates: 11, 16 & 20 December 2017

- Mexico City (Hotel Royal Pedregal) (Pit Start)
- Mexico City (Mexico City International Airport) to Cartagena, Colombia (Rafael Núñez International Airport)
- Naranjas (Los Lagos)
- Turbaco (El Balcón)
- Cartagena (Centro de Convenciones Cartagena de Indias – Patio de Banderas)
- Cartagena (Camellón de los Mártires)
- Cartagena (Palace of Inquisition)
- Cartagena (Plaza de los Coches)
- Cartagena (Plaza de la Aduana)
- Cartagena (Museo de Arte Moderno and Baluarte de San Ignacio)
- Cartagena (Carrera 4)
- Santa Catalina (El Totumo and Ciénaga Del Totumo)
- Loma de Arena (Tienda Orgullo Paisa)
- Loma de Arena (Main Square)
- Turbaco (El Manantial)
- Cartagena (Plaza de Toros de Cartagena de Indias)

In this leg's Roadblock, one team member had to memorize a book that contained the names, images, and descriptions of twenty models and then enter the Museo de Arte Moderno, where they would find five of the twenty models, who had their appearances altered with cosmetics. They then had to find a woman dressed as Betty from the Colombian telenovela Yo soy Betty, la fea and had to identify all five models by name to her to receive their next clue. If the chosen team member misidentified a model, then teams would have to make their way outside the museum to Baluarte de San Ignacio, where the participating team member had to undergo a local beauty treatment to revitalize their face. After finishing the beauty treatment, they could attempt the task again.

Additional tasks

- At Los Lagos, one team member had to memorize a map, which directed a safe path across a lake with large lily pads, and relay this information to their partner, who had to cross the lake by stepping on the correct lily pads so they could retrieve their next clue. If the team member crossing the lake stepped on a lily pad that sank, they had to return to the start.
- At El Balcón, one team member to pedal a high-wire bicycle suspended above the ground while their partner, who was sitting below the bicycle, had to drop ten cutouts of animals indigenous to Colombia, such as a sloth, a bat, a caterpillar, and a crab, onto images of the animals' habitats to receive their next clue. Before leaving El Balcón, teams made their way to a nearby fruit drink stand where they would receive a drink provided by ספרינג (Spring).
- At Patio de Banderas, teams voted for who they wished to Yield and then made their way to a vendor on Camellón de los Mártires selling telephone calls. Teams had to encourage locals within the plaza to purchase a telephone call for COP$200. Any local who agreed would call a loved one and, following their call, would listen to a phrase in Hebrew, which they had to repeat to the team. Teams had to repeat this process three additional times until they obtained four phrases. Once teams were told all four phrases, they had to combine them and figure out that the phrases directed them to the flower garden within Cartagena's inquisition museum. Teams then had to travel to the museum to find their next clue.
- At Palace of Inquisition, one team member had to place an easel with large floral display on their back. Using a hinged pole and hook, that team member had to pull bunches of flowers, scissors, pruning shears, and a pink ribbon off their back following their partner's guidance. After all the items were obtained, team members had to work together, with one member still carrying the easel on their back, to place the flowers on a floral foam block following an example to create an image of a globe. Once teams properly recreated the floral display, they would receive their next clue.
- At Plaza de los Coches, team members had to don a suit covered with sponges, enter a pool filled with orange juice. After the sponges absorbed the juice, teams made their way across the plaza to a tank, where teams had to squeeze all the juice off their bodies until they transferred 35 liters (9.2 U.S. gal) of juice from the pool to the tank and filled the tank to the red line to receive their next clue.
- On Carrera 4, teams found out if they were Yielded.
- At El Totumo, team members had to climb into the mud bath atop the volcano, search for satchels containing gemstones, wash the satchels in the nearby Ciénaga Del Totumo lagoon and deposit the gems into a pan until they acquired 2 kilograms (4.4 lb) of gems to receive their next clue.
- After arriving in Loma de Arena, one team member had to push a three-wheeled sandwich cart while their partner pedaled a bicycle wheel to generate electricity to power a panini press. Teams had to follow a marked path to a group of awaiting children in the town square under a statue of Virgin Mary. Once there, teams had to prepare grilled cheese sandwiches using the cart's panini press and cheese from Israel. After distributing the sandwiches, teams received their next clue.
- At El Manantial, teams had to search under 50 cubes of panela for one which had a miniature Amazing Race flag hidden underneath to receive their next clue directing them to the Pit Stop, where the Yielded team would have to wait out a 15-minute penalty. Teams had to eat any panela they picked up.

=== Leg 7 (Colombia → Jamaica) ===
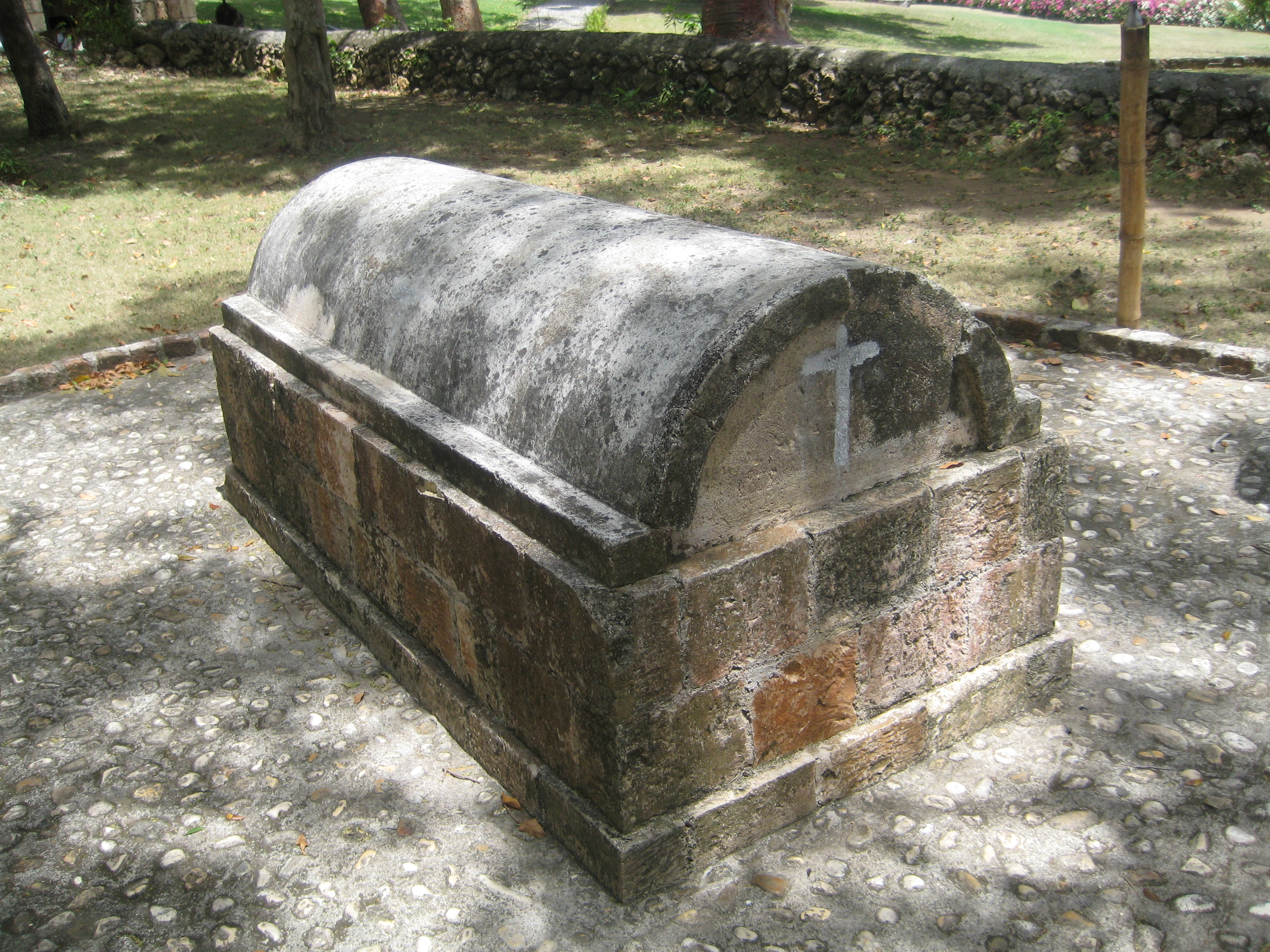
During the leg in Jamaica, teams visited the tomb of the White Witch of Rose Hall for a voodoo themed task.

Airdates: 23, 27 & 30 December 2017, 3 January 2018

- Cartagena (InterContinental Cartagena) (Pit Start)
- Cartagena (Rafael Núñez International Airport) to Montego Bay, Jamaica (Sangster International Airport)
- Montego Bay (Charles Gordon Market)
- Montpelier (St Mary's Preparatory & Kindergarten)
- Montego Bay (Rose Hall – The Aqueduct)
- Granville (Gunns Drive)
- Montego Bay (Bellefield Great House)
- Montego Bay (Rose Hall)
- Montego Bay (Tropical Bliss)
- Sandy Bay (Tryall Club Beach)
- Sandy Bay (Chukka Sandy Bay Ranch)
- Montego Bay (Barnett Estate)
- Montego Bay (Doctor's Cave Beach Club)
- Montego Bay Richmond Hill Inn)
- Sandy Bay (Tryall Golf Club)

In this leg's Roadblock, one team member had to stand atop the side of a rum barrel and roll the barrel across The Aqueduct to receive their next clue. If they fell off of the barrel, they would have to return to the starting point and try again. After the Roadblock, teams voted for who they wished to Yield.

For this leg's Duel, one member of each team would be hung upside-down above a circle of nine treasure chests while wearing a pirate eyepatch. Team members had to place four flags in the four correspondingly colored chests and place a fifth flag within a final chest at the far end of the circle to win a round. The first team to win two of three matches would win the Duel and would receive their next clue. The team that lost the final Duel had to wait out a 15-minute penalty.

Additional tasks

- At Charles Gordon Market, one team member had to drive a Jamaican pushcart, typically used to transport food through markets, through the market while their partner rode in the cart and find a Rastafarian with Amazing Race-colored beads in his dreadlocks to receive their next clue.
- At St Mary's Preparatory & Kindergarten, teams would be given a tablet computer provided by Partner and would watch a video on how to perform the Maypole dance. After watching the video, teams had to weave ribbons around a maypole with the school's children to receive their next clue.
- In Granville, teams had to run through the town one kilometre (0.62 mi) up and then down a hill while dragging a heavy log. While running, teams would pass by local residents each holding a sign and wearing medals displaying a city and a year. Most of the signs contained the host city and year of previous Olympic Games; however, a couple of signs did not contain real Olympic city and year combinations. Teams had to collect a medal from the people holding signs containing the city and year of the Summer Olympic Games where Usain Bolt won gold medals. When teams thought that they had all the necessary medals, they had to run back down the hill to the finish line. When teams obtained medals from the people holding signs for the Beijing 2008, London 2012, and Rio de Janeiro 2016 Olympics and crossed the finish line in under ten minutes, they would receive their next clue, otherwise they would have to attempt the task again.
- At Bellefield Great House, teams had to put on a two-person frog costume with its eyeholes on the sides of its head like actual frog eyes. While hopping throughout the property, teams had to find large five flies with different colored wings and use their frog tongue to place their flies in a basket to receive their next clue from a woman dressed as Princess Tiana.
- At Rose Hall, teams made their way to the tomb of the White Witch of Rose Hall, who, according to legend, learned voodoo from her nanny after her parents died and whose spirit is said to haunt Rose Hall. Once there, team members had to decide who would be "infected" with an evil spirit and who would attempt to remove the evil spirit. The "infected" team member had to don an evil spirit white suit and hold a glass of blue-colored potion. Their teammate would use a blowgun to shoot darts at four targets surrounding a voodoo doll symbolizing the evil spirit they are attempting to remove. If the team member blowing darts hit the voodoo doll, then their partner would receive the pain felt by the spirit in the form of an electric shock. When all four targets were hit, the spirit would be "exorcized" and teams would receive their next clue. After the voodoo task, teams discovered if they were Yielded.
- At Tropical Bliss, teams had to use a rope and grappling hook to snatch one of several glass bottles within a marked section of beach. When they retrieved a bottle, teams had to unwrap the paper inside the bottle to reveal a flag. If teams uncovered a Jolly Roger, they had to snatch another bottle with the grappling hook until they retrieved a bottle with an Amazing Race flag inside. After raising their flag up their flagpole, teams would find their next clue written on a message in the bottle that contained the flag. Before leaving Tropical Bliss, teams made their way to a nearby fruit drink stand where they would receive a drink provided by ספרינג (Spring).
- At Chukka Sandy Bay, each team member had to climb up one of two cargo nets suspended high above the Caribbean. Each team member had to retrieve a coin from four bags of their assigned color. After retrieving four coins, each team member had to swing on a rope over to other net and climb up to retrieve their final coins and receive their next clue. If any team member fell off the net, teams would reset and resume the task where they left off.
- At Barnett Estate, teams had to carry coconuts from a coconut pile to a seesaw catapult, then both team members had to launch a coconut into a barrel to receive their next clue.
- At Doctor's Cave Beach Club, teams had to pick two locals and form a four-person human table by laying each person's head atop another person's knees. Walking along the beach, each group of four had to pick up two halves of a Bob Marley phonograph record to receive their next clue. If the table collapsed before teams retrieved both halves, they would have to perform the task from the beginning.
- At Richmond Hill Inn, teams had to search through 150 bowls of powdered sugar by blowing off the sugar until they found the one bowl with a banana to receive their next clue, which directed them to the Pit Stop, where the Yielded teams had to wait out a 15-minute penalty.

=== Leg 8 (Jamaica → Russia) ===
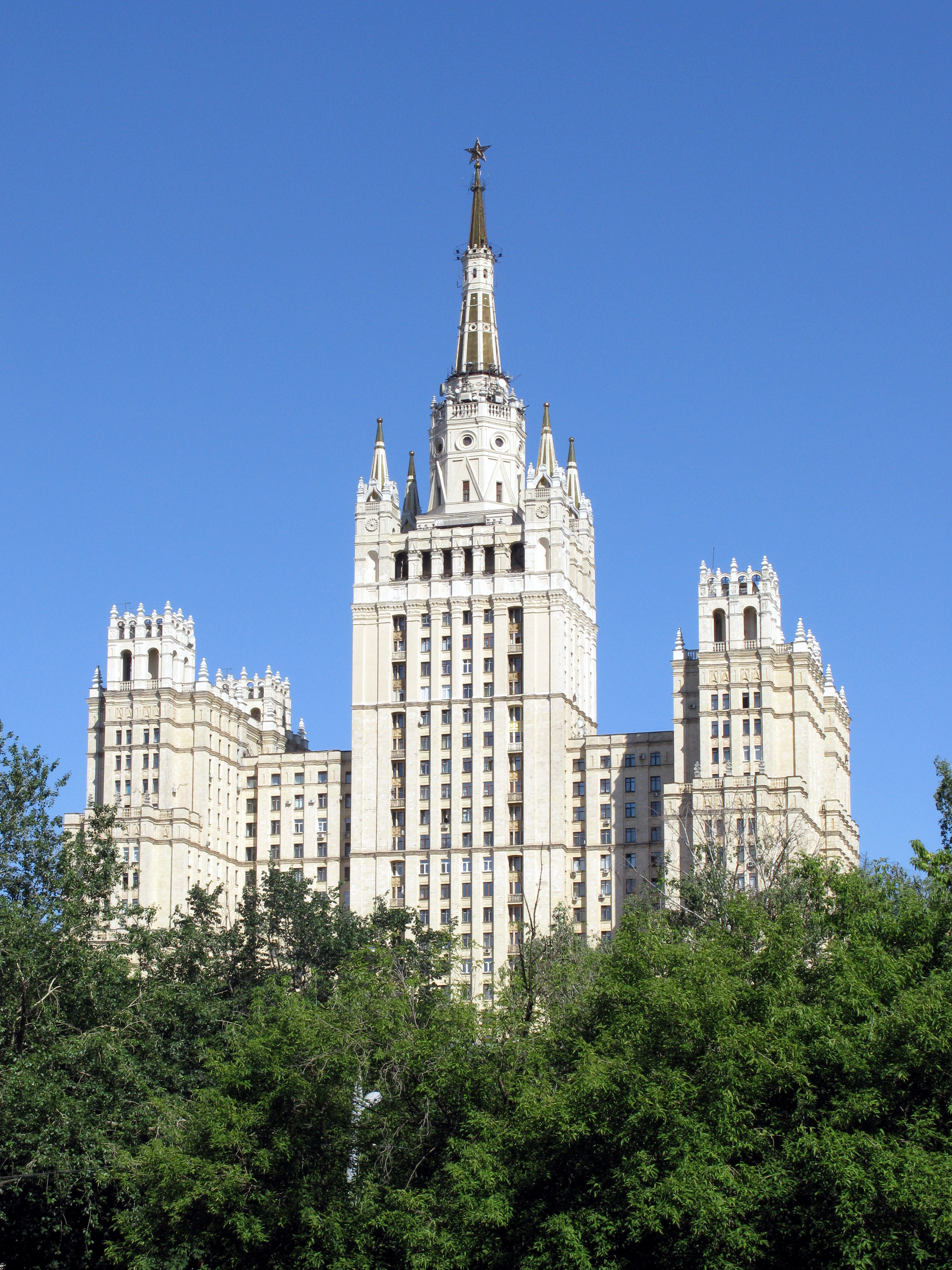
Teams had to find the Pit Stop at the Kudrinskaya Square Building, one of the Seven Sisters in Moscow.

Airdates: 6, 10, 13 & 17 January 2018

- Montego Bay (Sangster International Airport) to Moscow, Russia (Sheremetyevo International Airport)
- Moscow (Manezhnaya Square)
- Moscow (Yar Restaurant)
- Moscow (Kuskovo Park)
- Moscow (Moscow II-Mitkovo)
- Moscow (R-Studios)
- Moscow (Sokolniki Park – Sokolniki Exhibition and Convention Centre)
- Moscow (Sokolniki Park – BEST Dance Studio)
- Moscow (Rumyantsev State School of Circus and Variety Arts)
- Moscow (Tsvetnoy Boulevard)
- Moscow (Filevsky Park)
- Moscow (Autoline Bus Depot)
- Moscow (Nikolskaya Street)
- Moscow (Alexander Hall)
- Moscow (Kiyevskaya to Krasnopresnenskaya)
- Moscow (Kudrinskaya Square Building)

In this season's final Roadblock, one team member had to pilot a remote controlled helicopter and land it on a miniature helipad placed on a helmet worn by their teammate to receive their next clue.

Additional tasks

- In Manezhnaya Square, one team member had to don a tutu and stand atop a spinning platform mimicking a Prima Ballerina music box figurine. Their partner had to arrange a series of gears of different sizes on a board with a number of holes so that the gears could spin to receive their next clue. If the team member atop the rotating platform became dizzy and needed a break, then they would have to wait 15 minutes and their partner also had to stop solving the gear puzzle.
- At Yar Restaurant, teams had to sample eight dishes of Russian cuisine from a buffet, which included Borscht, Pirozhki, Olivier salad, Pelmeni, Shuba salad, and Kompot. After choosing a dish, teams would also be given a checklist of the dish's ingredients. Teams had to completely eat the dish and then had to mark the ingredient missing from the dish on the checklist. When teams thought that they had identified all eight missing ingredients, they had to present their checklists to the restaurant's chef. Any checklist with incorrectly marked ingredients would be given back to teams, and they would have to eat those dishes again. When teams identified all eight missing ingredients, they would receive their next clue.
- At Kuskovo Park, teams had to read a marked section from three books: Crime and Punishment, Tevye the Dairyman & Anna Karenina. After memorizing the three sections, teams had to carry fifty book up a staircase to a literature professor, who would show teams a series questions one at a time about the books they read. When teams answered three questions correctly, they would receive their next clue. Otherwise they would have to carry their books back down the staircase and perform the task again until they answered three questions correctly.
- At the Mitkovo railway station, teams had to choose a barrel of oil, specifically refined so that it was not dangerous to the teams, with a letter and three numbers printed on the barrel. Teams had to search the oil to find four tiles with their letter and numbers. When they did, they would receive a key and had to find a shipping container with the same letter and number combination. When they found the container, team had to use their key and attempt to unlock the container. If their key did not unlock the container, then teams had to choose another barrel and search for its tiles. When teams were able to unlock a container, they could retrieve their next clue.
- At R-Studios, teams had to navigate a room full of highly sensitive lasers until they could retrieve two Fabergé eggs, with their next clue inside one of the eggs. If any of the beams were broken, an alarm would be triggered and teams had to return to the start.
- Outside BEST Dance Studio, teams voted for who they wished to Yield.
- At Rumyantsev Acrobatics School, teams had to learn and perform four acrobatic moves on an aerial hoop while suspended in the air to receive their next clue.
- On Tsvetnoy Boulevard, teams made their way to the park near the Moscow Circus on Tsvetnoy Boulevard, where they had to learn plate spinning. One team member had to spin a plate on a stick and pass it to their partner, who had to place the plate atop a pole. When teams were able to get five plates to spin simultaneously atop the pole for five seconds without falling, they would receive their clue.
- At Filevsky Park, teams made their way to a picnic table, where they would find pictures of their loved ones. After enjoying a picnic lunch of bread and Israeli cottage cheese, teams would receive their next clue. Before leaving Filevsky Park, teams found out if they were Yielded.
- At Autoline Bus Depot, teams had to solve a riddle and had to discover the destination of a person named "Stas" in order to find their next clue. Teams would be presented with a riddle which listed Stas's departure date and time and Stas's arrival date and time. Using this information, a map, and a chart with Russia's nine different time zones with their UTC offsets, teams had to figure out Stas's destination. When they believed to have found Stas's destination, teams had to search the bus depot's parking lot to find a bus with a sign containing their destination. Teams then had to thoroughly clean the bus's exterior. When the bus driver was satisfied, they could open the clue underneath the bus. If the clue contained a paper with the phrase "Try Again," then teams would have to solve the riddle again and wash another bus. When teams chose the correct bus, they would find their next clue.
- On Nikolskaya Street, teams had to find a birthday stand. When they found it, one team member had to dress as Gena the Crocodile by donning a crocodile head while their partner had to dress as Cheburashka in a full bear costume. Teams had to carry a bunch of balloons, a birthday cake and candles, a basket of oranges, and a present with a Hamsa keychain along the street and give their gifts to a person celebrating their birthday, which they had to verify by checking their identification. When they did, they would sing "Happy Birthday to You" in Russian following along a video played by a tablet computer provided by Partner. After they finished singing, they would lift their birthday guest in a chair the same number of times as their age. Finally, they would need to take a picture of themselves and their birthday guest using the tablet. When they did, they would receive their next clue.
- At Alexander Hall, teams had to watch a performance of "Kalinka" sung by the Red Army Choir and had to identify from atop a balcony the member of the choir not actually singing in order to find the Pit Stop. In front of seven members of the choir was a sign listing one of the Seven Sisters, seven Stalinist style skyscrapers in Moscow, which would be partially blocked by two Trepak dancers. When they believed that they identified the lip syncing choir member, they had to observe the sign in front of him and make their way outside the concert hall where they would find seven images each depicting one of the Seven Sisters with a clue attached. Teams would take a clue from the image of the location that they believed was in front of the lip syncing choir member. If they were incorrect, they would be directed to the building they chose only to find that the Pit Stop was not there. If they were correct, they would be instructed to travel via the Moscow Metro to the Kudrinskaya Square Building, where they would find the Pit Stop and where the Yielded teams would have to wait out a 15-minute penalty.

=== Leg 9 (Russia → Kyrgyzstan) ===
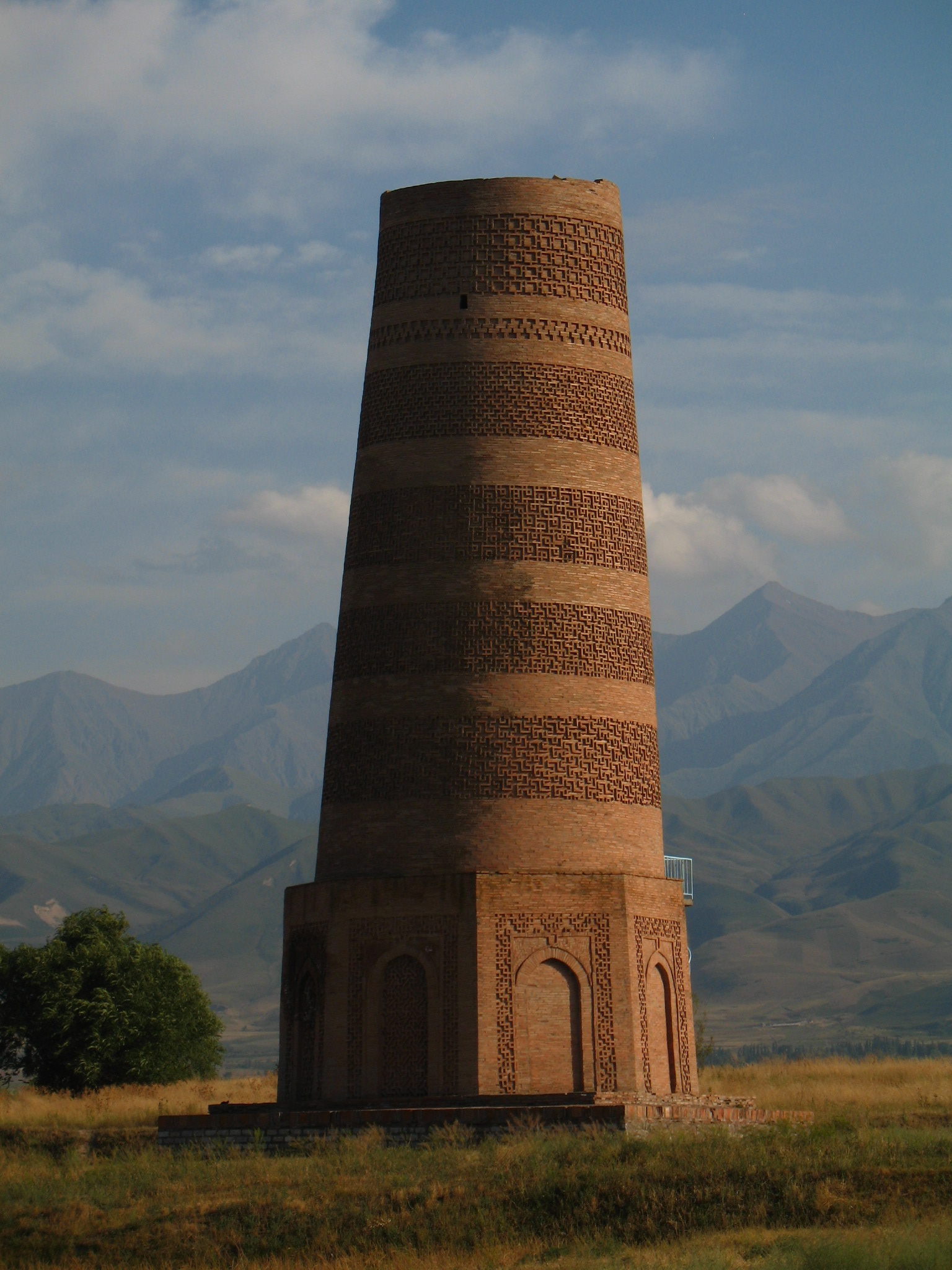
Teams ended this leg in Kyrgyzstan at the Burana Tower in the Chuy Valley.

Airdates: 20, 27 & 31 January, 3 & 5 February 2018

- Moscow (Sheremetyevo International Airport) to Bishkek, Kyrgyzstan (Manas International Airport)
- Kashka Suu (Field)
- Ala Archa National Park (Ala-Archa River)
- Kashka Suu (Politech Ski Resort)
- Ala-Too (Apple Orchard)
- Ala-Too (Hill)
- Ala-Too (Jumar's Farm)
- Bash Kara Suu (Village Farm)
- Bishkek (Chingiz Aitmatov Cinema)
- Bishkek (Osh Bazaar)
- Bishkek (Dordoy Bazaar)
- Tokmok (Burana Tower)

For this season's final Duel, teams had to memorize a board listing the 12 animals of the Chinese zodiac, which was incorporated into the Kyrgyz calendar, and three celebrities born under the year of each animal. Teams would then make their way to a field with 36 pyramids, each listing one of the 36 celebrities. Teams would spin a wheel and one team member had to find pyramids listing the celebrities listed under whatever animal the wheel landed on. The first team to bring back two out of the three correct pyramids would win the round. The first team to win two rounds would win the Duel. The team that lost the final Duel had to wait out a 15-minute penalty.

Additional tasks

- In Kashka Suu, teams had to don Kyrgyz warrior outfits and shoot flaming arrows with a bow at six haystacks. When each team member set three haystacks ablaze, they would search the charred remnants for a Balbal, a tiny carved stone statue depicting a Kyrgyz warrior, which they could exchange for their next clue.
- At the banks of the Ala Archa River, teams had to remove a large dirty carpet from a yurt, hang it on top of a cleaning rack, and clean it to the babushka's satisfaction to receive their next clue.
- At Politech Ski Resort, teams made their way to a wooden drying surface for horse and cattle manure, a fuel source for yurts, which was divided into nine squares. Eight of squares were covered with manure, and teams had to move the manure from one square to the uncovered square enough times until they discovered the word "Salam" (Салам), hello in Kyrgyz that they had to reiterate to receive their next clue. Before leaving Politech Ski Resort, teams voted for who they wished to Yield.
- In the apple orchard in Ala-Too, teams had to climb atop a scaffolding and roll apples between two metal poles. When the apples were above an apple crate, teams would spread the poles and attempt to drop the apple into the crate. When teams landed an apple in two of the three crates, they would receive their next clue.
- Atop the hill near Ala-Too, team members had to don a suit with pictures of Israeli celebrities attached and would be harnessed to a selkinchek, a rigid arm swing typically found in Kyrgyz weddings. While swinging, the team member on the bottom of the swing would pass a picture to their partner, who had to pair the picture of the celebrity with their spouse, which included host Ron Shahar and wife Maya Kramer from HaMerotz LaMillion 1. If teams needed to stop swinging or made an incorrect pairing, they would wait out a 5-minute penalty. When teams matched every celebrity to their spouse, they would receive their next clue. Before leaving the hill, teams found out if they were Yielded.
- After arriving in Kash Bara Suu, teams had to assemble a series of pipes. One team member would hold onto the end of their pipe, while their partner would attach new sections of pipe. The team member holding the assembled pipe could not let it touch the ground, and their partner could not hold onto the pipe to attach a new section. If either occurred, then teams would have to start assembling again. When their pipe was fully assembled, teams had to hold one end of their pipe over a watering trough and pour a bucket of water into the other end. When teams were able to get water into the trough, they would receive a USB flash drive and had to search the village for a house with a laptop or a television with a USB port, which they could plug their flash drive into to discover their next clue.
- At Chingiz Aitmatov Cinema, teams would watch scenes from the Kyrgyz film Ak-Keme. Teams were instructed to play close attention to find their next clue but during the film, they would be surprised with a video chat with their loved ones, who would tell teams their next clue at the end of their conversation.
- At Osh Bazaar, teams had to encourage passersby to lift a hot samovar using ropes. Then, teams had to direct the participating passersby to work together to tilt the samovar until ten glasses were filled with tea to the marked line to receive their next clue.
- At Dordoy Bazaar, teams had to find a puzzle piece hidden among a bundle of compressed goods. When team members found the piece, they had to load all the unbundled items under a screw press and compress them again until they reached a height of 40 cm (16 in). Teams then had to repeat this process five times until they found all six pieces that they had to assemble to form the flag of Kyrgyzstan to receive their next clue.
- At the Dordoy Bazaar's bus parking lot, one team member had to search the bazaar for colored banners while directed by their partner using a tablet computer provided by Partner. When the searching team member found a banner, they would read a multiple choice question about Kyrgyzstan to their partner. Each answer contained a three digit number, and the directing team member would attempt to unlock the correspondingly colored box using the numbers of the answer they chose. If unsuccessful, they would have to wait out a 5-minute penalty. If they opened the box and it was empty, then they would have to search for another banner. When teams opened the correct box, they would find a replica of the Burana Tower, which they had to figure out was the Pit Stop, where the Yielded teams would have to wait out a 15-minute penalty.

=== Elimination Villa (Greece) ===
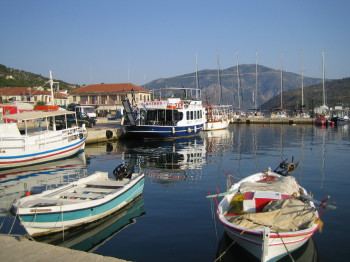
Eliminated teams were sequestered on the island of Meganisi in Greece, where they discovered that they had a chance to re-enter the competition.

Airdate: 7 February 2018

- New York City (John F. Kennedy International Airport) or Honolulu (Honolulu International Airport) or Mexico City (Mexico City International Airport) or Cartagena (Rafael Núñez International Airport) to Preveza, Greece (Aktion National Airport)
- Nydri (Harbor) to Meganisi (Villa Helena)
- Spartochori (Lakis Tavern and Porto Spilia)
- Vathy (Errikos Restaurant)
- Meganisi (Abelike Bay)
- Spartochori (Spilla Beach)
- Preveza (Aktion National Airport) or Moscow (Sheremetyevo International Airport) to Bishkek, Kyrgyzstan (Manas International Airport)
- Tokmok (Burana Tower)

Elimination villa challenges

- In the first challenge, Nimrod & Yonatan and Jessica & Asaf had to stack plates onto a tray and carry them up a set of stairs from Porto Spilla to the Lakis Tavern. The first team to bring 100 intact plates to the tavern would win the challenge and a parasailing reward. Nimrod & Yonatan won this reward.
- In the second challenge, the above teams, plus Honey & Avivit and Yossi & Udi would be blindfolded and be served 20 plates of Greek cuisine. After feeding the food to each other, teams had to match the plates into 10 identical pairs. The first team to do so would win the challenge and a sailboat meal reward, which they could share with one team. Jessica & Asaf won this reward and shared it with Yossi & Udi.
- In the third challenge, all above teams, plus Mor & Mor would compete one at a time. One team member would paddle a kayak out to a group of buoys floating in Abelike Bay. They would then retrieve a satchel attached to each buoy. They would bring the satchels to their partner on shore, who had to unscramble the Hebrew letters inside to spell Crete in Hebrew. The team that completed the challenge the fastest would win the challenge and a video chat with their loved ones, which they had the option of giving to another team. Jessica & Asaf won this reward and gave it with Yossi & Udi.

Additional notes

- At Nydri's harbor, the eliminated teams were informed that they would have a chance to compete for a chance to return to the competition later in the season. They then were brought by boat to the Villa Helena on the island of Meganisi, where they would be sequestered.
- At Spilla Beach, the sequestered teams, with the exception of Mor & Mor, were instructed to travel to Kyrgyzstan to compete for the chance to return to the competition. Adi & Meitar were given a clue within a matryoshka doll at the Moscow Pit Stop hotel with the same information. Finally, Regev & Helen were informed by Ron Shahar immediately after their elimination at the Burana Tower that they would be able to earn the ability to return to the competition.
- At Burana Tower, Ron Shahar informed the final 4 teams that the previously eliminated teams would be competing for a Return Ticket. Ron then informed the eliminated teams that they would compete a leg in Kyrgyzstan and that the first team to reach the Pit Stop would win the Return Ticket.

=== Leg 10 (Kyrgyzstan) ===
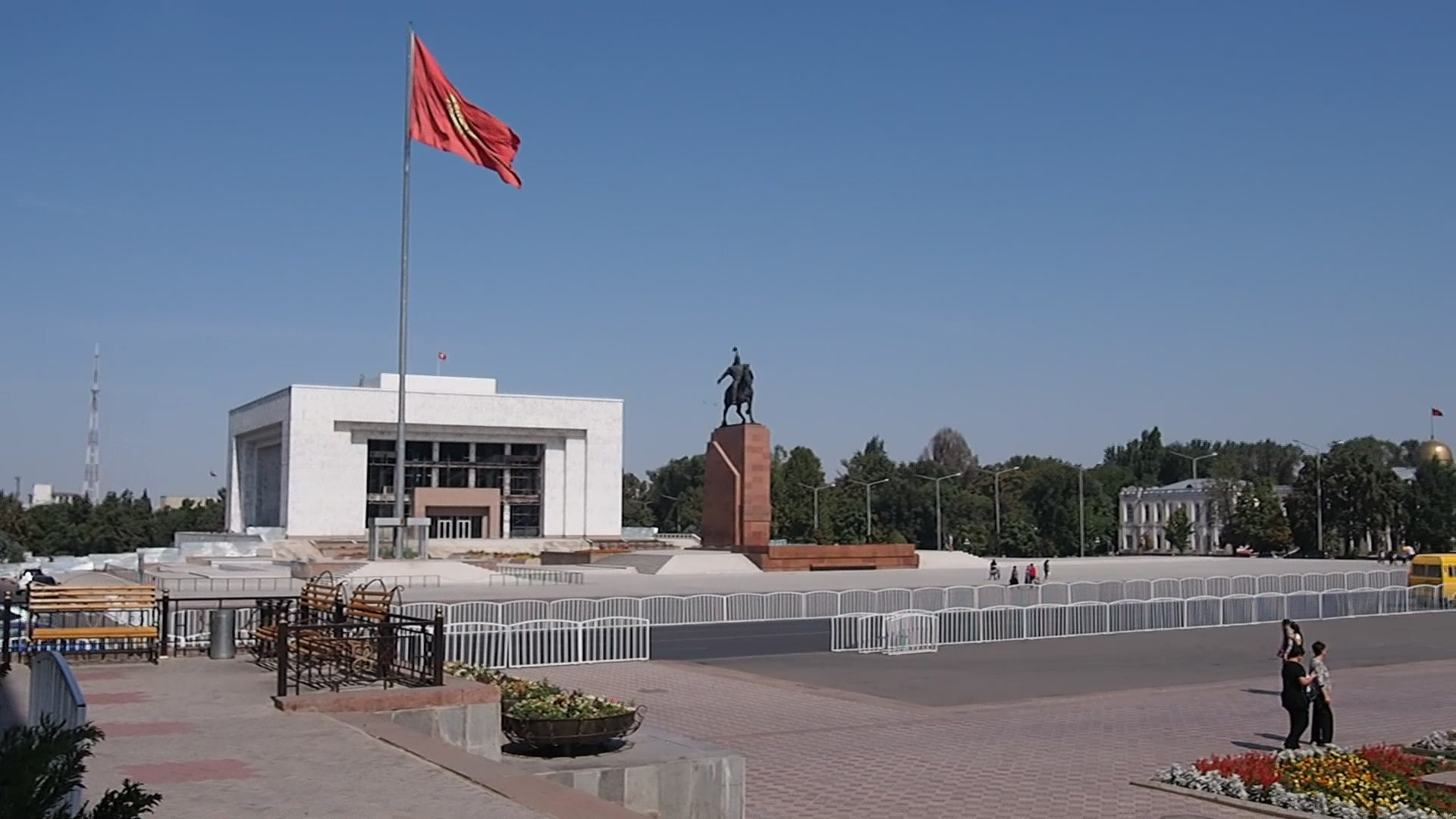
Teams discovered who would re-enter the competition at Ala-Too Square in Bishkek.

Airdates: 10, 12 & 17 February 2018

- Issyk-Kul Region (Boom Gorge)
- Jol Bulak (Field)
- Jol Bulak (Tarihbaev Mamytzhan School) (Elimination Point)
  - Bishkek (Kafe/Aşhkana)
- Issyk-Kul Region (Mountains overlooking Issyk-Kul)
- Chong-Aryk (Tash Kordo Restaurant)
- Bishkek (Panfilov Park)
- Bishkek (Ala-Too Square)

Additional tasks

- At Boom Gorge, teams had to go white water rafting on the Chu River and grab three flags – the national flag of the country they were eliminated in, an Amazing Race flag that listed their elimination city, and a flag that contained an image of the greeter of the Pit Stop where they were eliminated – to receive their next clue.
- In Jol Bulak, teams had to carry two boards of kurut across a field and into a house until they delivered 100 kurut to receive their next clue.
- At Tarihbaev Mamytzhan School, teams were told their position and were told to keep racing. The last team to arrive was eliminated at this point.
- In the mountains surrounding Issyk-Kul, teams would play a game show called חוזרים לרוץ (Running Back) hosted by Adi Shilon. One team member had to answer true-or-false questions related to this season, and their partner pulled down the bucket listing their answer. If they were correct, they would discover that the bucket was empty. If incorrect, the bucket's contents would spill out onto them and teams would have to wait a 5-minute penalty. After answering 15 questions, Adi Shilon would hand teams their next clue.
- At the restaurant Tash Kordo, teams had to form 10 braids of sheep's intestines. Teams would then fill 15 bowls with bowel soup and would enter a yurt to serve their soup to the guests to receive their next clue.
- At Panfilov Park, teams received a list of 10 familiar quotations and phrases in Hebrew, each missing one word. Teams had to encourage passersby to translate the missing words, communicating them through pantomime, into Kyrgyz. Teams then had to record themselves speaking the quotations in Hebrew with the locals saying the correct missing words in Kyrgyz on a tablet computer provided by Partner to receive their next clue.

Additional note

- While the eliminated teams were competing, the Final 4 were given the chance to send letters and a gift to their families using the Click and Pick website at Kafe/Aşhkana.

=== Leg 11 (Kyrgyzstan → Thailand) ===
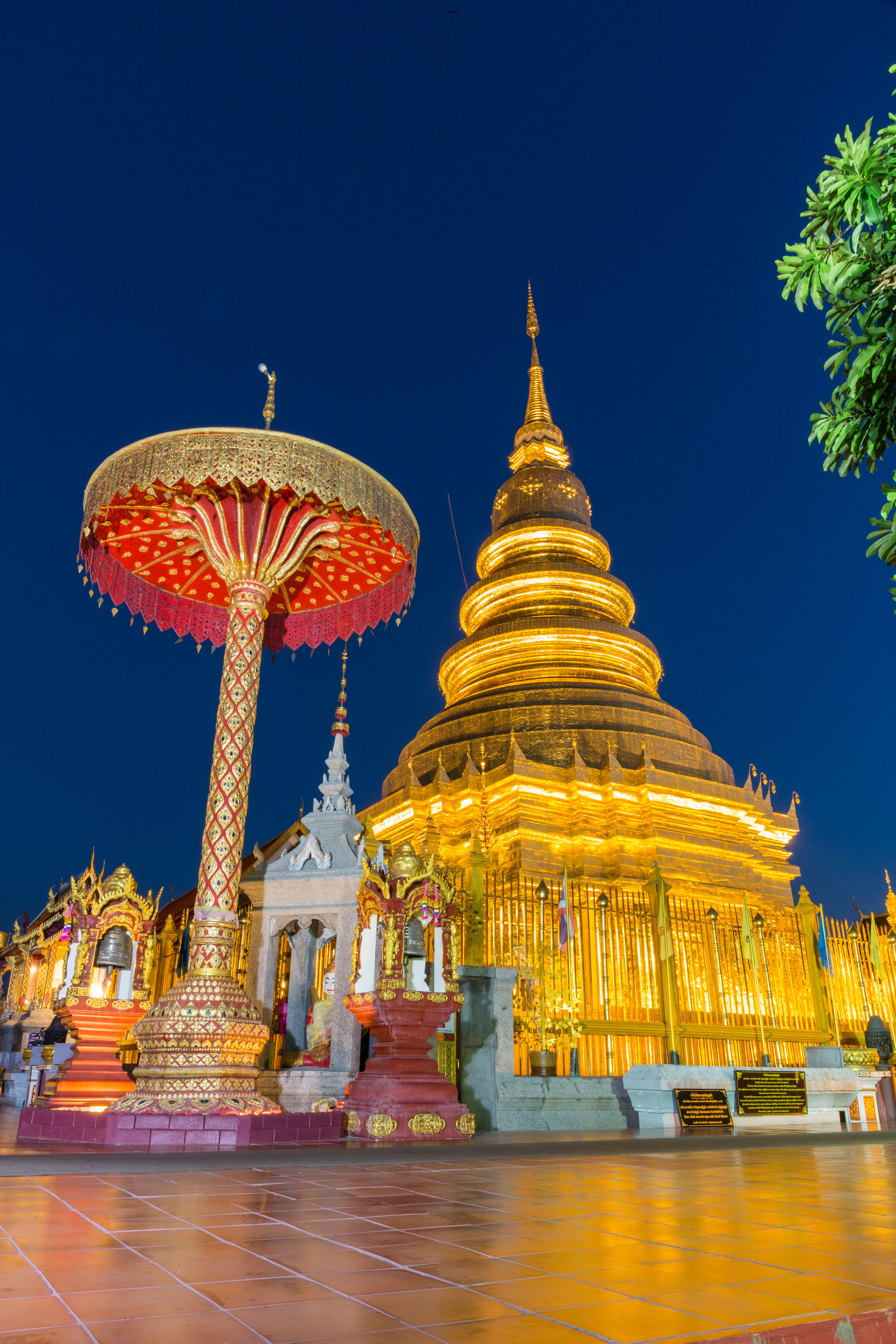
Teams concluded their first leg in Thailand at Wat Phra That Hariphunchai in Lamphun.

Airdates: 21 & 24 February 2018

- Bishkek (Manas International Airport) to Chiang Mai, Thailand (Chiang Mai International Airport) via Israel
- Pai (Ban Huay Pa Rai Hill Tribe Village)
- Don Kaeo (Huay Tung Tao Lake)
- Chiang Mai (Wat Phra That Doi Suthep)
- Chiang Mai (Baan Suan Rubber Plantation)
- Chiang Mai (Old Chiang Mai Cultural Center)
- Chiang Mai (Festival of Light Field)
- Lamphun (Wat Phra That Hariphunchai)

Additional tasks

- At Ban Huay Pa Rai Hill Tribe Village, teams had to find a marked house, where one team member had to learn a sentence in Thai from the homeowner. They then had to reiterate the sentence relying on their memory to their partner as they made their way to the village farm. When they arrived, the team member who learned the sentence second had to speak the sentence to the farm owner. The sentence teams learned indicated what they had to bring back to the home, and the farm owner would direct teams as to what to bring back based on what they stated. If teams spoke the sentence incorrectly, they would be instructed to bring back the wrong item and would be rejected by the homeowner. When teams spoke the sentence correctly and brought the correct item, they would receive their next clue.
- At Huay Tung Tao Lake, one team member had to pull themselves along a zip-line above the lake until they reached a fruit basket. Their partner would be in a boat floating on the lake and would find a bamboo raft that listed a Thai fruit, a month, and a riddle. The team member on the zip-line had to toss the correct fruit based on the provided information to their partner on the lake. The team member in the lake had to place the fruit in the correct baskets. When all the fruits were in the correct baskets, teams would receive their next clue.
- At Wat Phra That Doi Suthep, teams had to memorize the different types of Buddha statues within the temple. After memorizing the statues, team had to make their way to the temple's souvenir market and search among thousands of replica statues until they found an exact match for each of the nine statues within the temple. When teams found the correct replicas, they would receive their next clue.
- At Baan Suan Rubber Plantation, teams had to fill four small bowls, attached to a pair of stilts, with latex. One team member had to walk on the stilts, assisted by their partner, across the plantation to a partially filled large bowl, where they would transfer the latex remaining from their four bowls. Teams would continue until they filled the large bowl to the marked line. When they did, teams would be given a basket of rubber bands, which they had to wrap around a watermelon. When the watermelon exploded, teams would receive their next clue.
- At the Old Chiang Mai Cultural Center, one team member had to learn the thousand-hand dance. After learning the dance by watching a video on a tablet computer provided by Partner, one team member had to perform in-sync with a dance group, with their partner able to assist them by saying the order of the movements, to receive their next clue.
- At the Festival of Light field, teams had to use a long bamboo pole to transfer paper lanterns among four trees until each tree consisted of lanterns of one color. When all the lanterns were on the proper tree, teams would receive their next clue directing them to the Pit Stop.

=== Leg 12 (Thailand) ===
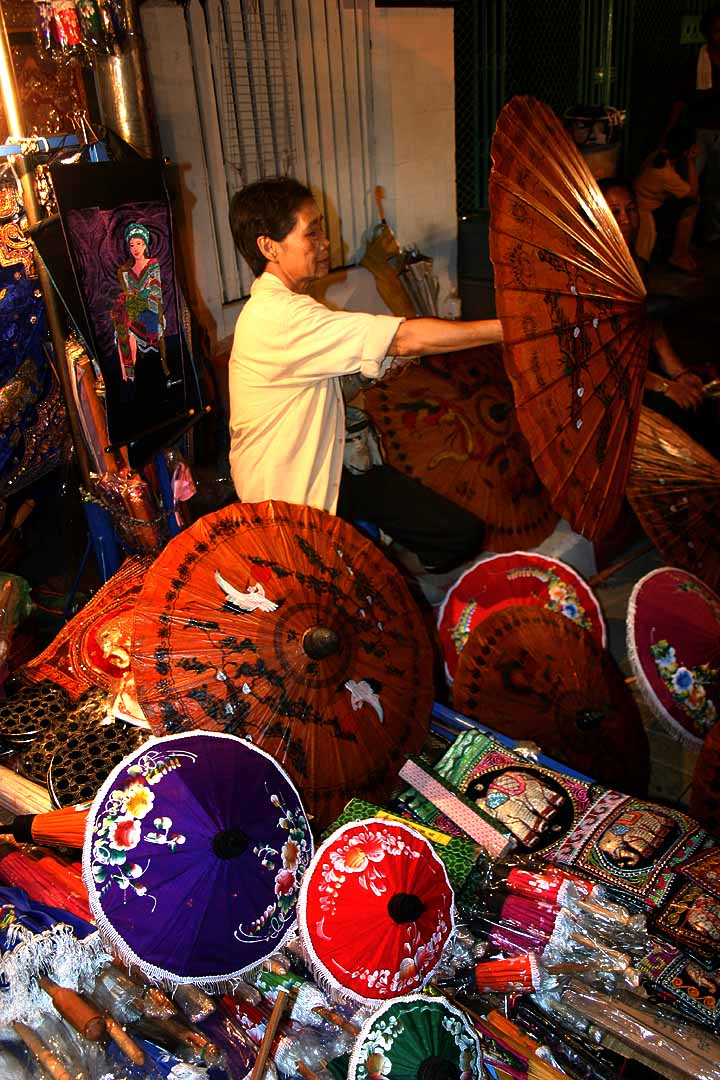
In Bo Sang, teams had to search through numerous oil-paper umbrellas to receive their next clue.

Airdates: 3 & 10 March 2018

- Mae Raem (Tat Mok Waterfall)
- Mae Chaem District (Baan Pa Bong Piang Rice Field)
- Chiang Mai (The River Market Restaurant)
- Mae Raem (Phoenix Adventure Park)
- Chiang Mai (Anusarn Market)
- Bo Sang (Saa Paper & Umbrella Handicraft Centre)
- Chiang Mai (Wat Phra That Doi Kham)

Additional tasks

- At Tat Mok Waterfall, both team members had to abseil 30 m (98 ft) down each side the waterfall and had make four stops along the way. At each stop, both team members would find a picture depicting four animals. Only one animal appeared on both images at a parallel stop. Teams members had to find this animal, without saying the animal names to each other, and memorize the number underneath it. When teams believed that they found all four numbers and reached the bottom, they would input their numbers into a combination lock. If they inputted the correct numbers (6136), they would unlock their next clue.
- At Baan Pa Bong Piang, teams would be tethered together and would enter a rice paddy. There, teams would find numbered bamboo poles with wrapped white fabric. Similar to connect the dots, teams would unwrap the fabric and tie it to the subsequent pole. When teams finished, a multirotor would fly over their field. If they were correct, they would discover an image of an elephant and would receive their next clue after reiterating this fact to the judge.
- At The River Market Restaurant, each team member made their to a table with a bowl of either tom yum or tom kha kai and bowls of ingredients. Using a ladle, team members had to search their soup to discover its ingredients. Then, they would ask their partner for the ingredients for their soup. Team members would then transfer ingredients to each other using oversized chopsticks and would place them in a large bowl. When both team members obtained their ingredients, they would receive their next clue.
- At Phoenix Adventure Park, each team member would enter a cage that would be secured with four locks. Team members had to roll their cages along a marked course retrieving keys along the way needed to unlock their cages before retrieving their next clue.
- At Anusarn Market, teams had to encourage seven passersby to don colored shirts and pants, representing days of the week. They then had to apply hair spray, the same color as the shirt and pants, onto each person. When each person was wearing their appropriate color, teams would receive their next clue.
- At Saa Paper & Umbrella Handicraft Centre, teams would be tethered together with a rope and then had to open oil-paper umbrellas until they found one with a small Amazing Race flag that they could exchange for their next clue directing them to the Pit Stop. Teams would have to hold on to or attach to their rope any umbrella they opened. If teams felt couldn't hold any more umbrellas, they would have to wait out a 5-minute penalty and could drop off their umbrellas.

=== Leg 13 (Thailand → Israel) ===
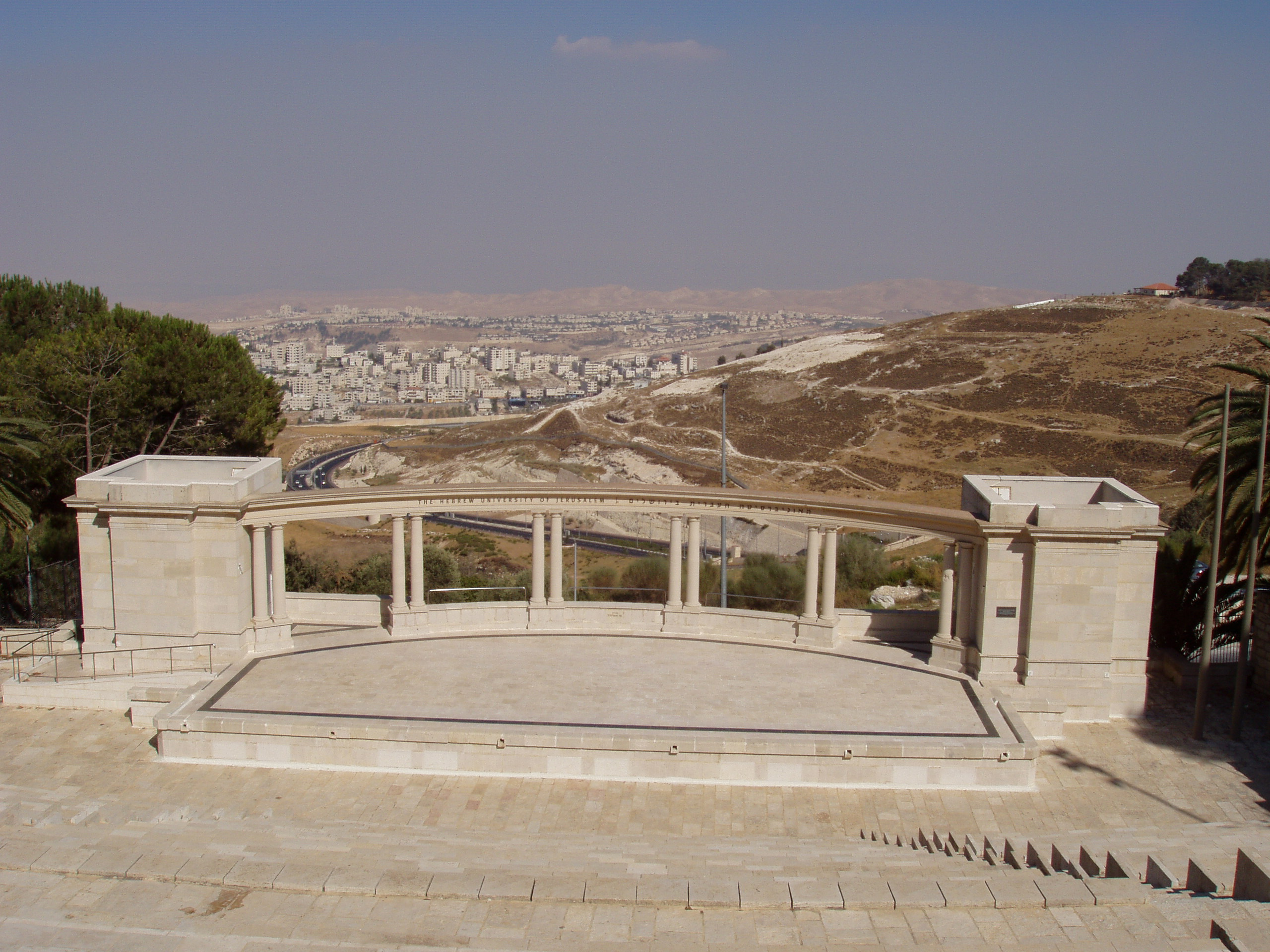
In Jerusalem, teams crossed the Finish Line at the Rothberg Amphitheater within the Hebrew University of Jerusalem.

Airdate: 17 March 2018

- Chiang Mai (Hot Air Balloon Field)
- Chiang Mai (Chiang Mai International Airport) to Bangkok (Don Mueang International Airport)
- Bangkok (Rajamangala National Stadium)
- Bangkok (Molly Bar)
- Bangkok (Sky Walk Condominium)
- Pattaya (Mini Siam)
- Bangkok (Suvarnabhumi Airport) to Tel Aviv, Israel (Ben Gurion Airport)
- Tel Aviv (Muvix Concept)
- Jerusalem (Hebrew University of Jerusalem – Rothberg Amphitheater)

Additional tasks

- Teams began the leg by taking a ride in a hot air balloon above Chiang Mai before traveling to Bangkok.
- At Rajamangala National Stadium, teams would harnessed to two ends of a rope and pulley system that would allow one team member to pull their partner into the air alongside a huge metal frame. The suspended team member had to describe to their partner an image of Thai script divided into twelve squares, each with a number. The team member on the ground had to pull their partner until they reached large puzzle pieces. They had to grab the pieces in the correct order according to the numbers and the description given and pass them to their partner, who would place them in the corresponding spot. When all the pieces were placed on the frame, teams would receive their next clue.
- At Molly Bar, one team member had to don a mask and a tablet computer provided by Partner and carry out five Thai delicacies. The team member carrying the food couldn't speak, so their partner remaining at the bar had to convince five people to each eat one of the five delicacies. When all the meals were eaten, teams would receive their next clue.
- At Sky Walk Condominium, teams made their way to the building's helipad. There, teams had to use three hooks with attached stirrups to climb out along metal beams suspended 220 m (720 ft) above the city until they could retrieve two clues envelopes at the other end. If teams fell off, they would be pulled back to the start. After they retrieved the clues and climbed back to the building's helipad, they could combine the clues to reveal their next destination.
- At Mini Siam, teams found a clue in front of a replica of the Statue of Liberty. They were informed that the season had not ended and were instructed to travel to Muvix Concept in Tel Aviv. Teams were released from Ben Gurion Airport in the same order they arrived at Mini Siam.
- At Muvix Concept, teams had to discover the location of the Finish Line. Teams would watch video clips of the season while listening to four songs written during the 70 years of Israel's existence about cities where there is a university (Jerusalem, Tel Aviv, Beersheba, and Haifa). Teams had to find the song that was most recently written and travel to the university within that city in order to find the Finish Line. If teams determined that the song about Jerusalem, "Guardians of the Walls" (שומר החומות), was the most recently written song, then they would find the Finish Line at the Rothberg Amphitheater within the Hebrew University of Jerusalem.

== Ratings ==
Data courtesy of the Israeli Rating Committee, according to individuals aged 4+ from the general population.

No.	Air date	Episode	Percentage	Nightly Rank	Ref
1	21 October 2017	"Kickoff Event"	12.1%	1	
2	25 October 2017	"The Teams Land in New York"	8.5%	1	
3	28 October 2017	"The American Shake"	11.4%	1	
4	1 November 2017	"Elimination in New York"	7.4%	2	
5	4 November 2017	"The Teams Land in Hawaii"	8.1%	1	
6	8 November 2017	"The Teams Are Falling Apart"	8.0%	1	
7	11 November 2017	"Elimination in Hawaii"	10.1%	1	
8	15 November 2017	"Landing in Mexico"	8.1%	1	
9	18 November 2017	"Suspended in the Air"	7.1%	1	
10	25 November 2017	"Elimination in Mexico"	8.3%	1	
11	29 November 2017	"The Pepper Task"	6.7%	1	
12	2 December 2017	"Day of the Dead"	8.5%	1	
13	9 December 2017	"A Nerve-Racking Elimination Episode"	8.8%	1	
14	11 December 2017	"Landing in Colombia"	6.8%	1	
15	16 December 2017	"Soaked in Emotion"	8.3%	1	
16	20 December 2017	"Elimination in Colombia"	8.5%	1	
17	23 December 2017	"Landing in Jamaica"	7.5%	1	
18	27 December 2017	"The Voodoo Mission"	7.3%	1	
19	30 December 2017	"A Beligerant Duel"	8.6%	1	
20	3 January 2018	"Elimination in Jamaica"	6.5%	1	
21	6 January 2018	"The Teams Land in Russia"	8.2%	1	
22	10 January 2018	"The Oil Mission"	7.2%	1	
23	13 January 2018	"The Russian Circus"	8.2%	1	
24	17 January 2018	"Elimination in Russia"	7.6%	2	
25	20 January 2018	"Landing in Kyrgyzstan"	9.0%	1	
26	24 January 2018	"Great Exposure"	6.2%	3	
27	27 January 2018	"The Last Duel"	8.0%	1	
28	31 January 2018	"Drama in Kyrgyzstan"	8.0%	1	
29	3 February 2018	"The World is Turning Upside Down"	8.4%	1	
30	5 February 2018	"Elimination of Eliminations"	<4.0%	>5	
31	7 February 2018	"The Rules Are Breaking"	6.8%	1	
32	10 February 2018	"War of the Eliminated"	8.0%	1	
33	12 February 2018	"A Mission from Another World"	5.8%	2	
34	13 February 2018	"The Teams Exposed"	<3.8%	>5	
35	17 February 2018	"Return Episode"	7.9%	1	
36	21 February 2018	"Quarterfinal"	6.6%	1	
37	24 February 2018	"An Elimination Before the Semifinals"	7.1%	1	
38	3 March 2018	"Semifinals Part 1"	8.6%	1	
39	10 March 2018	"Semifinals Part 2"	8.0%	1	
40	13 March 2018	"Jumping into the Finals"	<3.9%	>5	
41	17 March 2018	"Semifinals Part 2"	10.1%	1	
42	21 March 2018	"Reunion"	4.3%	3	
