= Coa de jima =

Specialized tool for harvesting agaves

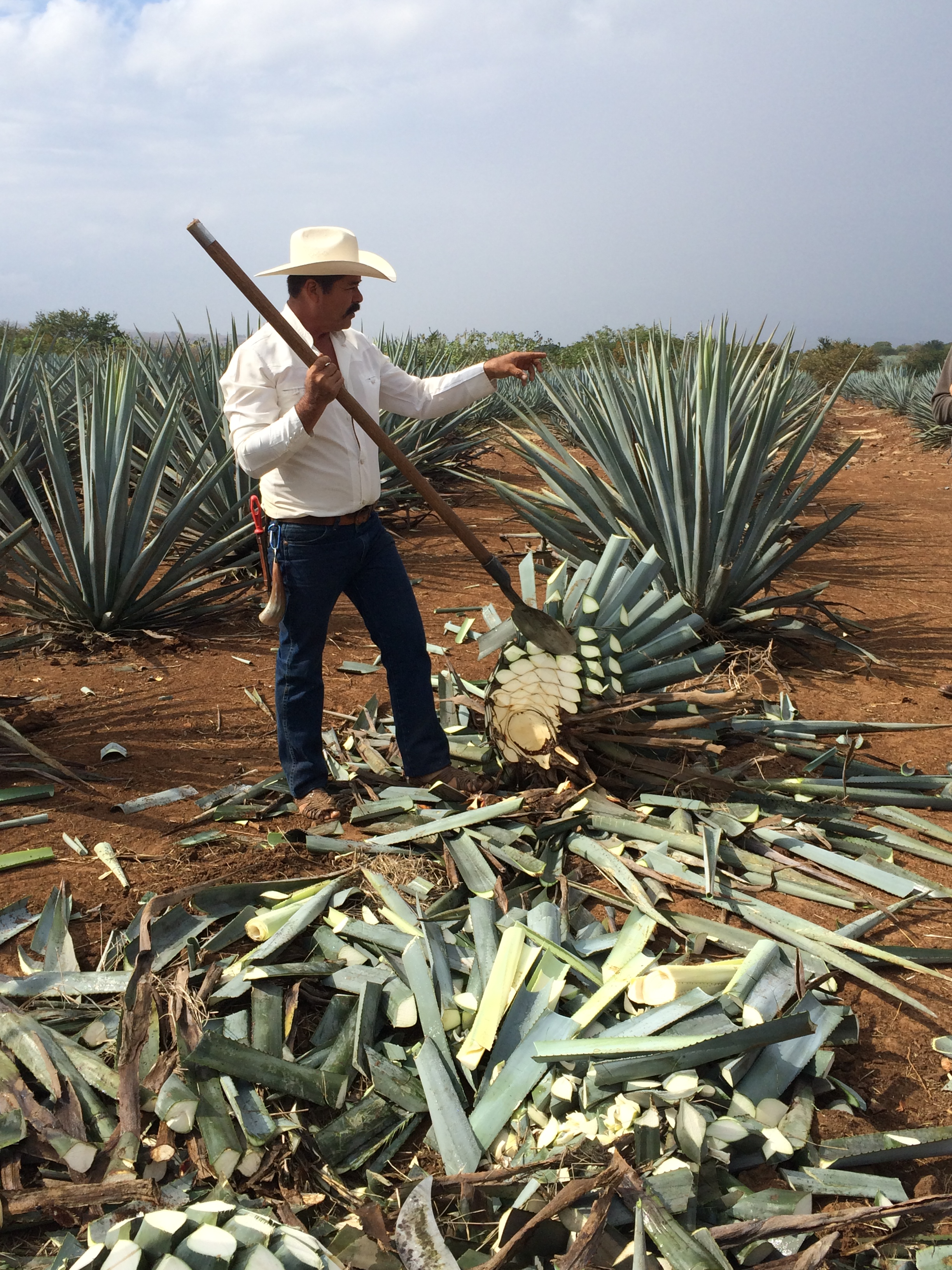
A jimador using a coa de jima

A coa de jima or coa ("hoe for harvesting", "hoe") is a specialized tool for harvesting agaves.

It is a steel piece with the sharp semi-circular blade on a long wooden handle used by a jimador to cut the leaves off an agave being harvested and to cut the agave from its roots. The core (or "heart") of the agave left, called piña is used for the production of mezcal, sotol or tequila.

The shape of the coa is adapted for the efficiency of carrying out these operations.
