= Jimador =

Type of farmer

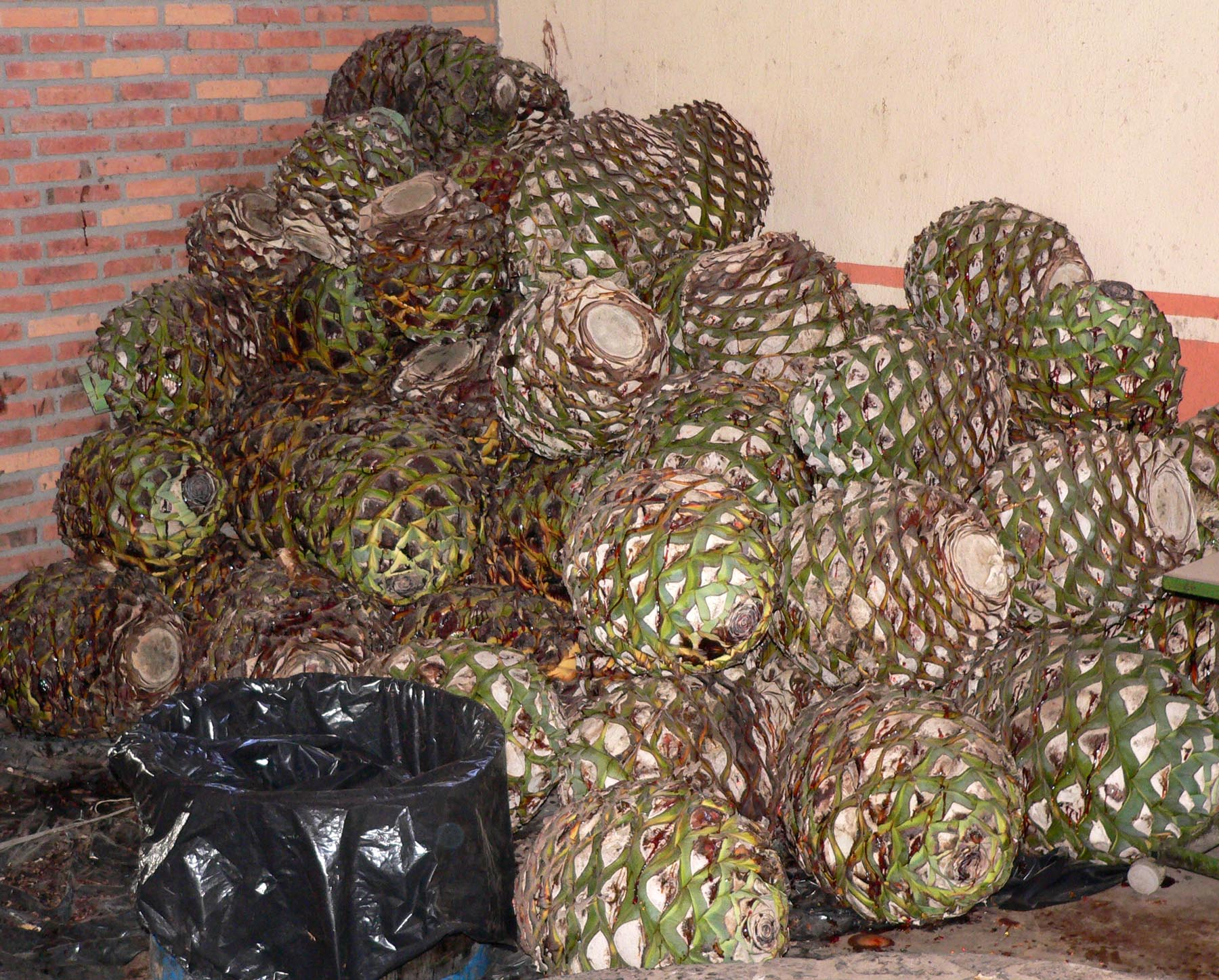

A jimador is a type of farmer who harvests agave plants, which are harvested primarily for the production of mezcal, sotol and tequila. This task requires the skill of identifying ripe agave, which ripens in between 5 and 35 years, depending on the agave species. Unripe agave can have a bitter or overly sweet taste, ruining the distilled spirits made from them. The primary tool of a jimador is the coa de jima or simply coa. This is a flat-bladed knife at the end of a long pole that resembles a hoe. The coa is used to first remove the flower from the agave, which causes the central pineapple (or piña) to swell. Later, the piña is harvested, using the same tool to cut off all of the external leaves of the plant, leaving only the pulpy center which is then chopped and cooked in preparation for the mezcal or tequila production.
