= Tzukei Yam =

Community settlement in central Israel

Tzukei Yam: צוּקֵי יָם (Hebrew); تسوكي يام (Arabic)
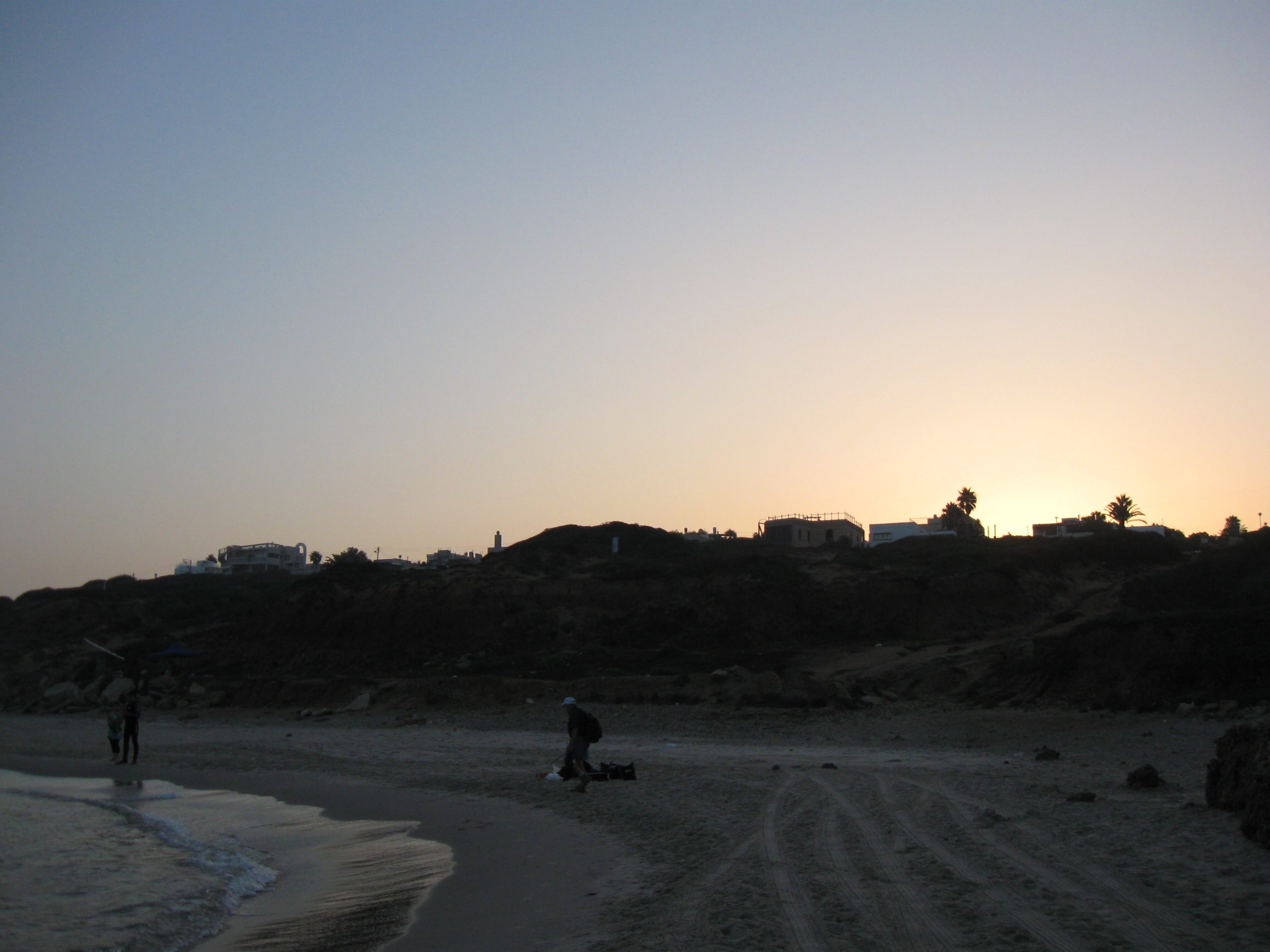
- Tzukei Yam beach

- Location within Central Israel
- Coordinates: 32°21′37″N 34°51′39″E
- Country: Israel
- District: Central
- Subdistrict: HaSharon
- Council: Hefer Valley
- Founded: 1956
- Population (2024): 223

Tzukei Yam (Hebrew: צוּקֵי יָם, lit. Sea Cliffs) is a community settlement in central Israel. Located on the coast of the Mediterranean Sea to the north of Netanya, it falls under the jurisdiction of Hefer Valley Regional Council, of which it is the westernmost community. In 2024 it had a population of 223.

== History ==
The village was established in 1956, and was named after the nearby cliffs.
