= Bo Sang =

Settlement in Thailand

Coordinates: 18°46′9″N 99°5′12″E

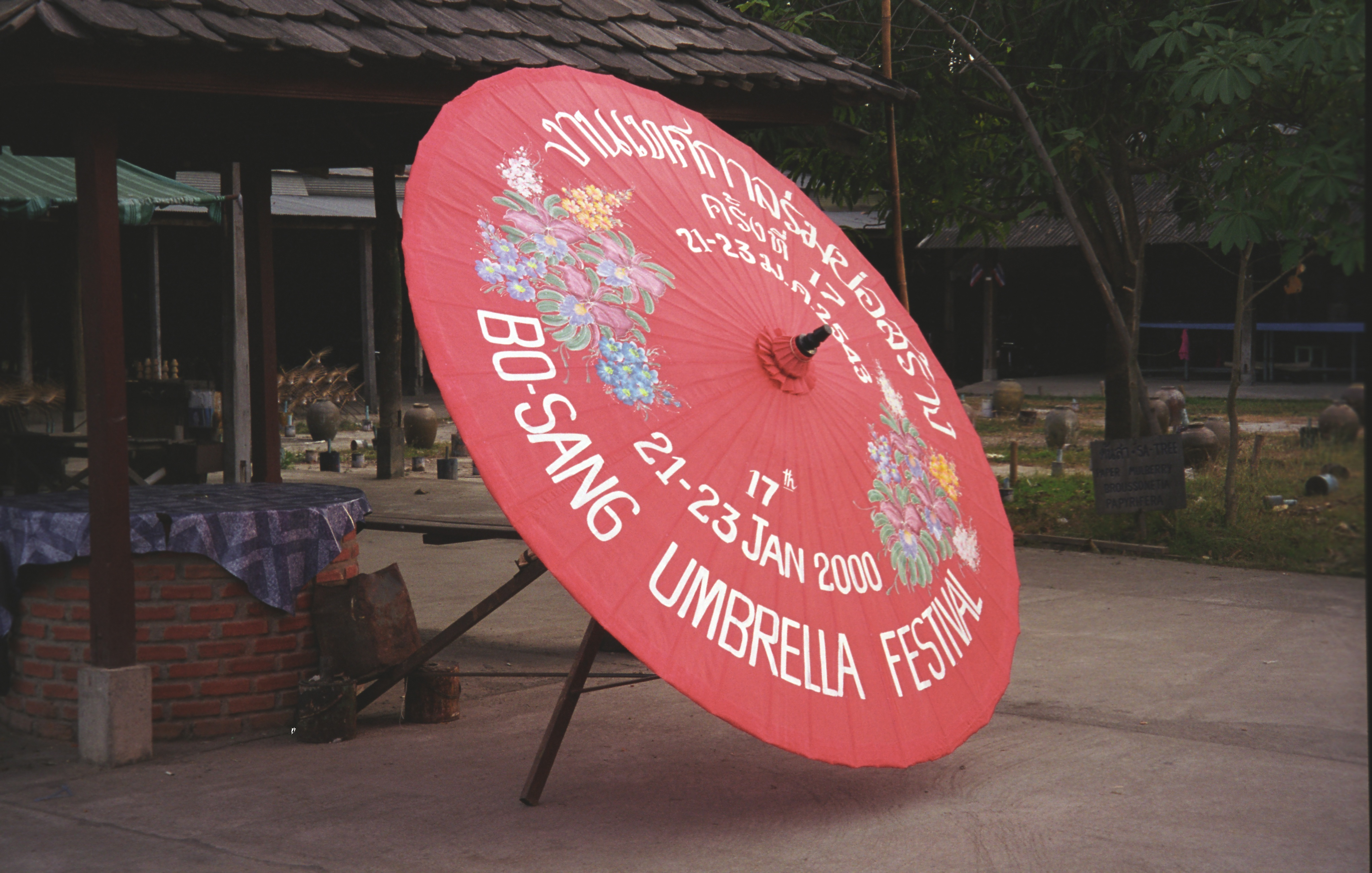
Bo Sang umbrella

Bo Sang (Thai: บ่อสร้าง, pronounced [bɔ̀ː sâːŋ]), also known as Ban Bo Sang (บ้านบ่อสร้าง, pronounced [bâːn bɔ̀ː sâːŋ]) is a muban (village) in Ton Pao sub-district, San Kamphaeng district in the outskirts of Chiang Mai in upper northern Thailand.

== Overview ==
It is known for its brightly coloured handmade umbrellas and parasols, which are often decorated with floral designs. The town hosts an annual festival and the Miss Bo Sang beauty pageant. It is held annually at every third week of January for three days.

== Population ==
The ancestors of most of Bo Sang's population are Tai Lüe who migrated from Yunnan province.

== Toponymy ==
Its name comes from the locals built a well near the Phai Zang (ไผ่ซาง) (a species of bamboo). Hence called "Bo Zang" (well of Zang), later its name was corrupted to "Bo Sang".

The first element bo (บ่อ) means "well" or "no". The second element sang (สร้าง) means "create" or "produce".
