= In Our Garden =

In our Garden (Hebrew: אצלנו בחצר, Etzlenu Behatzer) is a famous Israeli song (originally named "אורחים לקיץ - "Guests for the Summer") written and composed by Naomi Shemer.

The song is about caring for those who are different, knowing the different cultures and languages, learning about the other, and the longing for Peace.

The song tells about a fictional garden where children from all over the world appear and play together. Each one says "hello" in his own language. In the Hebrew language, "Hello" also means "Peace". As the lyrics say "Everyone who comes to our home has his own way to greet another".

"Hello" is said in the following different languages: Hebrew, Italian, French, Arabic, English, Chinese, Greek, Portuguese, Swahili, Hawaiian and Japanese.

Namoi Shemer was also famous for her knowledge of the Bible. The idea depicted in the song echos the prophets calling for Israel to open its gates to the world as part of World peace. The songs draws from Isaiah 26:2 "פיתחו שערים ויבוא גוי צדיק שומר אמונים", "Open ye the gates, that the righteous nation that keepeth faithfulness may enter in".

Part of the Song

אצלנו בחצר
בצל אילן פורח
ילדי כל העולם
באים להתארח
אצלנו בחצר
ילדי העולם כולו
רוקדים במעגל
ואומרים שלום

In our garden
In the shade of a flourishing tree
The children of the world
Are coming to be hosted
In our garden
The children of the whole world
Are dancing in a circle
And saying "Hello" !

== See also ==
- List of anti-war songs
