= List of HaMerotz LaMillion contestants =

This is a list of contestants who have appeared on the television series, HaMerotz LaMillion. Contestants with a pre-existing relationship form a team and race around the world against other teams to win ₪1,000,000. In total, 234 contestants have appeared in the series comprising 117 teams of two.

== Contestants ==
The presented information was accurate at the time of filming.

Contestant participated in HaMerotz LaMillion for a second time.

Name		Age	Occupation	Hometown	Season	Finish
Liran Kohner	לירן כוהנר	20	Miss Israel 2007	Rishon LeZion	Season 1	10th
Elena Ralph	ילנה ראלף	24	Miss Israel 2005	Ramat Gan	Season 1	10th
Asher Dazanshvili	אשר דזנשווילי	24	Student	Ashdod	Season 1	9th
Maor Galam	מאור גלאם	24	Student	Ashdod	Season 1	9th
Alen Billig	אלן ביליג	32	Doctor	Tel Aviv	Season 1	8th
Inbal Harel	ענבל הראל	26	Bartender	Tel Aviv	Season 1	8th
Hannah Shaham	חנה שחם	55	Travel agent	Ashdot Ya'akov	Season 1	7th
Margalit Koenig	מרגלית קינג	62	Retired teacher	Dganya B	Season 1	7th
Eliana Turgeman	אליאנה תורג'מן	33	Fashion Designer	Tel Aviv	Season 1	6th
Yael Ambar	יעל אמבר	32	Fashion Importer	Ramat Hasharon	Season 1	6th
Hadas Federman	הדס פדרמן	24	Student	Herzliya	Season 1	5th
Inbal Salvi	ענבל שלוי	24	Real Estate Agent	Herzliya	Season 1	5th
Michal Shaviv	מיכל שביב	35	High-Tech Wife	Or Yehuda	Season 1	4th
Ran Shaviv	רן שביב	39	Company CEO	Or Yehuda	Season 1	4th
Tom Kilman	תום קילמן	27	Painter	Herzliya	Season 1	3rd
Gil Kislev	גיל כסלו	54	Marketing Director	Herzliya	Season 1	3rd
Maya Kramer	מיה קרמר	30	Stylist	Tel Aviv	Season 1	2nd
Amichay Gat	עמיחי גת	33	Businessman	Tel Aviv	Season 1	2nd
Shay Kahana	שי כהנא	32	Businessman	Tel Aviv	Season 1	1st
Guy Osadon	גיא אוסדון	30	Businessman	Tel Aviv	Season 1	1st
Gadi Chayat	גדי חייט	36	Drummer	De Pere, Wisconsin	Season 2	11th
Alona Ofir	אלונה אופיר	44	Singer	Tel Aviv	Season 2	11th
Tal Shaham	טל שחם	54	Fitness Guru	Herzliya	Season 2	10th
Mor Shaham	מור שחם	29	Student	Herzliya	Season 2	10th
Nitzan Avital	ניצן אביטל	28	Baker	Alfei Menashe	Season 2	9th
Frida "Fifi" Moshe	פרידה "פיפי" משה	21	Baker/Model	Alfei Menashe	Season 2	9th
Firass Janluka	פיראס ג׳נלוקה	36	Fitness Trainer	Nazareth Illit	Season 2	8th
Shira Dahan	שירה דהן	33	Retail Manager	Nazareth Illit	Season 2	8th
Alon Apple	אלון אפל	32	Kickboxing Instructor	Tel Aviv	Season 2	7th
Hen Shiloni	חן שילוני	28	Model/Actress	Tel Aviv	Season 2	7th
Idan Pundak	עידן פונדק	30	Security Company CEO/Club Owner	Petah Tikva	Season 2	6th
Moti Lahav	מוטי להב	28	DJ	Petah Tikva	Season 2	6th
Osnat Shafir	אסנת שפיר	45	School Custodian	Kiryat Ekron	Season 2	5th
Carmit Zakai	כרמית זכאי	50	Volunteer Policewoman	Kiryat Ekron	Season 2	5th
Tom Kashty	טום קשתי	23	Professional Soccer Goalie	Tel Aviv	Season 2	4th
Adel Bespalov	אדל בספלוב	18	Gymnast	Tel Aviv	Season 2	4th
Akiva Shmueli	עקיבא שמואלי	28	National Service Recruiter	Tirat Yehuda	Season 2	3rd
Anaelle Shmueli	ענהאל שמואלי	26	Economy Student	Tirat Yehuda	Season 2	3rd
Alon Harel	אלון הראל	38	CEO	Tel Aviv	Season 2	2nd
Oren Harel	אורן הראל	47	Lawyer	Givatayim	Season 2	2nd
Bar Ben-Vakil	בר בן-וקיל	22	Artist/Model	Netanya	Season 2	1st
Inna Broder	אינה ברודר	23	Saleswoman	Netanya	Season 2	1st
Herut Weissenstern	חרות ואייסנסטרן	21	Student	Petah Tikva	Season 3	11th
Yael "Yoftut" Teitelbaum	יעל "יופטוט" טייטלבאום	20	Student	Petah Tikva	Season 3	11th
Andrea Salzmann	אנדריאה זלצמן	57	Freelance Writer	Jerusalem	Season 3	10th
Ronnie Salzmann	רוני זלצמן	60	Photographer	Jerusalem	Season 3	10th
Ronit Shavit	רונית שביט	33	Logistics Manager	Afula	Season 3	9th
Liran Cohen	לירן כהן	27	Lawyer	Afula	Season 3	9th
Shimi Edri	שימי אדרי	26	Restaurant Director	Tel Aviv	Season 3	8th
Yasmin Nagorni	יסמין נאגורני	19	Call Center Operator	Tel Aviv	Season 3	8th
Mor Cohen	מור כהן	28	Auto Shop owner	Eilat	Season 3	7th
Lior Cohen	ליאור כהן	33	Auto Shop owner	Eilat	Season 3	7th
Eliran Elenbogen	אלירן אלנבוגן	26	Beach Cleaner	Karmiel	Season 3	6th
Itzik Madhani	איציק מדהני	28	Dishwasher	Karmiel	Season 3	6th
Debby Baruch	דבי ברוך	46	Real Estate Agent	Jerusalem	Season 3	5th
Dana Dahari	דנה דהרי	24	Club Owner	Jerusalem	Season 3	5th
David Guedj	'דוד גדג	28	Port Worker	Ashdod	Season 3	4th
Eliran Look	אלירן לוק	28	Port Worker	Ashdod	Season 3	4th
Ma'ayan Refaeli	מעיין רפאלי	20	Shift Manager	Zrahia	Season 3	3rd
Bat-El Musai	בת-אל מוסאי	20	Customer Service	Zrahia	Season 3	3rd
Romi Gemer	רומי גמר	18	Soldier	Petah Tikva	Season 3	2nd
Coral Gemer	קורל גמר	20	Law Student	Petah Tikva	Season 3	2nd
Talia Gorodess	טליה גורודס	30	Analyst	Givatayim	Season 3	1st
Koby Windzberg	קובי וינדזברג	34	Electrical Engineer	Givatayim	Season 3	1st
Pnina Rosenblum	פנינה רוזנבלום	59	Businesswoman	Tel Aviv	Season 4	14th
Hen Haim Rosenblum	חן חיים רוזנבלום	21	Customer Relations	Tel Aviv	Season 4	14th
Inbal "Tzuki" Nativ†	ענבל "צוקי" נתיב	29	Saleswoman	Petah Tikva	Season 4	13th
Hila "Huti" Peretz	הילה "חוטי" פרץ	29	Beautician	Petah Tikva	Season 4	13th
Irit Bahir	אירית בהיר	54	PE teacher	Ein Harod (Meuhad)	Season 4	12th
Sinai Bahir	סיני בהיר	31	PE teacher	Ein Harod (Meuhad)	Season 4	12th
Liron "Tiltil" Urfali	לירון "טילטיל" אורפלי	38	Cab Driver	Tel Aviv	Season 4	11th
Shay Mizrahi	שי מזרחי	37	Money changer	Tel Aviv	Season 4	11th
Yafa Barzani	יפה ברזני	57	Musician	Rosh HaAyin	Season 4	10th
Boaz Vaknin	בועז וקנין	27	Musician	Kiryat Ono	Season 4	10th
Yael Duani	יעל דואני	32	Actress	Tel Aviv	Season 4	9th
Roni Duani	רוני דואני	28	Singer	Tel Aviv	Season 4	9th
Shay Attoun	שי אטון	27	Importer	Eilat	Season 4	8th
Adi Attoun	עדי אטון	27	Importer	Eilat	Season 4	8th
Raz Zelcerman	רז זלצרמן	29	Jeweler	Tel Aviv	Season 4	7th
Ruth "Alexa" Dolgakov	רות "אלכסה" דולגקוב	21	Model	Tel Aviv	Season 4	7th
Daniel Topaz	דניאל טופז	25	Entrepreneur, the son of Israeli TV personality Dudu Topaz	Tel Aviv	Season 4	6th
Meiri Shemesh	מאירי שמש	24	Entrepreneur	Jerusalem	Season 4	6th
Gal Almog	גל אלמוג	26	Accountant	Ashdod	Season 4	5th
Liel Gelstein	ליאל גלשטיין	26		Ashdod	Season 4	5th
Vladimir "Vova" Lazarovitch	ולדימיר "וובה" לזרוביץ'	27	Alarm installer	Petah Tikva	Season 4	4th
Alla Aibinder	אלה אייבינדר	25	Sales clerk	Petah Tikva	Season 4	4th
Yochi Apolion	יוכי אפוליאון	24	Model	Givatayim	Season 4	3rd
Linor Fahima	לינור פחימה	24	Model	Kiryat Ata	Season 4	3rd
Uriel Yekutiel	אוריאל יקותיאל	26	Choreographer	Tel Aviv	Season 4	2nd
Tom Baum	טום באום	20	MTV host	Tel Aviv	Season 4	2nd
Shay Gavriel	שי גבריאל	28	Poultry farmer	Ein Ya'akov	Season 4	1st
Shani Alon	שני אלון	27	Guest House Manager	Ein Ya'akov	Season 4	1st
Avi Manasherov	אבי מנשרוב	29	Municipality guard	Netanya	Season 5	14th
Avi Koren	אבי קורן	29	Vehicle fleet manager	Herzliya	Season 5	14th
Yossi Abdu	יוסי עבדו	23	Graphologist	Yagel	Season 5	13th
Lee Malka	לי מלכה	21	Waitress	Herzliya	Season 5	13th
Shira Ben Avraham	שירה בן אברהם	22	Bartender	Petah Tikva	Season 5	12th
Bar Sommer	בר סומר	22	Bartender	Ganei Am	Season 5	12th
Dor Sason	דור ששון	24	Barman	Holon	Season 5	11th
Sapir Aharon	ספיר אהרון	24	Modeling agency director	Bat Yam	Season 5	11th
Gali Berger	גלי ברגר	24	Accountant/Economy student	Kiryat Motzkin	Season 5	10th
Daniel Bardugo	דניאל ברדוגו	24		Kiryat Bialik	Season 5	10th
Naomi Alafi	נעמי אלפי	30	Business manager	Jerusalem	Season 5	9th
Chen Toledano-Alafi	חן טולדנו אלפי	25	Lawyer	Tel Aviv	Season 5	9th
Monada Kancepolsky	מונדה קנצ'פולסקי	26	Surf instructor	Netanya	Season 5	8th
Adriano Jauvel	אדריאנו חאובל	30	Model/Actor	Netanya	Season 5	8th
Shon Cohen	שון כהן	24	Realtor	Tel Aviv	Season 5	7th
Kim Weiss	קים וייס	22	Undergraduate student	Tel Baruch	Season 5	7th
Ben Scheflan	בן שפלן	25	Medicine student	Brooklyn, New York	Season 5	6th
Ori Scheflan	אורי שפלן	22	Musician	Tel Aviv	Season 5	6th
Yael Carmon	יעל כרמון	27	Dancer/Choreographer	Tel Aviv	Season 5	5th
Yosiel Neeman	יוסיאל נאמן	23	Business administration student	Holon	Season 5	5th
Tsion Azoulay	ציון אזולאי	25	Soccer player	Bat Yam	Season 5	4th
Aviv Kordova	אביב קורדובה	25	Soccer player	Holon	Season 5	4th
Jonathan "Joezi" Zirah	ג'ונתן "ג'וזי" זירה	28	Nightclub owner	Tel Aviv	Season 5	3rd
Alexandre "Alex" Amar	אלכסנדר "אלכס" עמר	26	Financial analyst	Netanya	Season 5	3rd
Lee Hadad	לי חדד	26	Zumba instructor	Rehovot	Season 5	2nd
Tal Alkobi	טל אלקובי	27	Account manager	Ashdod	Season 5	2nd
Amit Gal	עמית גל	63	Former basketball coach	Amir	Season 5	1st
Raz Gal	רז גל	32	Basketball coach	Tel Aviv	Season 5	1st
Noa Martinovich	נועה מרטינוביץ'	28	Medical student	Ramat Ef'al	Season 6	12th
Ma'ayan Martinovich	מעיין מרטינוביץ'	25	Instagram star	Ramat Ef'al	Season 6	12th
Jessica Cohen	ג'סיקה כהן	25	Network student	Tel Aviv	Season 6	11th
Asaf Gurfinkel	אסף גורפינקל	26	Computer student	Herzliya	Season 6	11th
Nimrod Meiri Haftel	נמרוד מאירי הפטל	23	Pianist	Tel Aviv	Season 6	10th
Yonatan Hafetz	יונתן חפץ	23	Pianist	Pardes Hanna-Karkur	Season 6	10th
Honey Yosef	הני יוסף	29	Traffic monitor	Holon	Season 6	9th
Avivit Marsha	אביבית מרשה	31	Traffic monitor	Holon	Season 6	9th
Yossi Mizrahi	יוסי מזרחי	40	Fireman	Tiberias	Season 6	8th
Udi Avitan	אודי אביטן	40	Police volunteer	Beit She'an	Season 6	8th
Mor Silver	מור סילבר	32	Instagram star	Tel Aviv	Season 6	7th
Mor Sweid	מור סוויד	31	Accounter	Tel Aviv	Season 6	7th
Adi Carmeli	עדי כרמלי	24	Event producer	Rishon LeZion	Season 6	6th
Meitar Assis	מיתר עסיס	23		Rishon LeZion	Season 6	6th
Anne Zivi	אן זיוי	23	Network Student, Stylist	Givatayim	Season 6	5th
Yarden Vizel	ירדן ויזל	23	Network Student, Attendant	Givatayim	Season 6	5th
Omer Barazani	עומר ברזני	25		Jerusalem	Season 6	4th
Neta Barazani	נטע ברזני	18.5	National Service worker at Hadassah	Jerusalem	Season 6	4th
Regev Hod	רגב הוד	37	Singer	Rehovot	Season 6	3rd
Helen Hod	הלן הוד	29		Rehovot	Season 6	3rd
Daniel Peretz	דניאל פרץ	23	Model	Shfela	Season 6	2nd
Eliyahu Shabtai	אליהו שבתאי	26	Model	Shfela	Season 6	2nd
Evelin Haimovich	אוולין חיימוביץ'	31	VAT worker	Tel Aviv	Season 6	1st
Tohar Haimovich	טוהר חיימוביץ'	35	Real Estate entrepreneur	Tel Aviv	Season 6	1st
Noy Karako	נוי קרקו	20	Actress, Singer, Model, Paramedic	Ginaton	Season 7	12th
Hadar Karako	הדר קרקו	20	Actress, Singer, Model, Paramedic	Ginaton	Season 7	12th
Kamle Hassian	כאמלה חסיאן	23	Legislation student	Jaffa	Season 7	11th
Bahira Abblassi	בהירה אבלאסי	24	Fashion design student	Jaffa	Season 7	11th
Yehoudit Alkoby	יהודית אלקובי	51	Coacher, Lecturer	Modi'in	Season 7	10th
Zohar Alkoby	זוהר אלקובי	24	Barber	Modi'in	Season 7	10th
Ran Gere	רן גיר	25	Falafel seller	Bat-Yam	Season 7	9th
Ben Leviev	בן לבייב	24	Falafel seller	Bat-Yam	Season 7	9th
Michal Krits	מיכל קריץ	19	Instagram star	Irus	Season 7	8th
Omer Nudelman	עומר נודלמן	21	Instagram star	Neta'im	Season 7	8th
Aviad Katz	אביעד כץ	38	Bar owner	Rehovot	Season 7	7th
Eden Katz	עדן כץ	24	Bar owner	Rehovot	Season 7	7th
Tali Raz Ben Ari	טלי רז בן ארי	58	Real Estate entrepreneur, Advocate	Givatayim	Season 7	6th
Gili Vizel	גילי ויזל	54	Mother of Yarden from Season 6	Givatayim	Season 7	6th
Nisim Hai David	ניסים חי דוד	26	Graduate communication studies	Kiryat Malakhi	Season 7	5th
Orel Elimelech	אוראל אלימלך	29	Chef	Kiryat Malakhi	Season 7	5th
Eyal Daniel	איל דניאל	24	High-tech worker	Neve Monosson	Season 7	4th
Sidney "Sid" Finer	סידני "סיד" פיינר	23	High-tech worker	Sharon plain	Season 7	4th
Haviv Maman	חביב ממן	30	Cosmetologist	Ma'alot-Tarshiha	Season 7	3rd
Itzhak Maman	יצחק ממן	30	Cosmetologist	Ma'alot-Tarshiha	Season 7	3rd
Ariel Kleinberg	אריאל קליינברג	23	Construction worker	Sderot	Season 7	2nd
Karin Kleinberg	קארין קליינברג	22		Sderot	Season 7	2nd
Matija "Tia" Galili	מאטיה "טיה" גלילי	23	Model	Tel Aviv	Season 7	1st
Fatima "Fay" Jakite	פאטימה "פיי" ז'קיטה	23	Model	Tel Aviv	Season 7	1st
Michal Azulay	מיכל אזולאי	53	Wedding Dress Designer	Beit Nekofa	Season 8	12th
Ruthi Ibn Ofir	רותי אבן אופיר	57	Self-Employed	Beit Nekofa	Season 8	12th
Shiri Stanescu	שירי סטנסקו	20	Bar-Ilan University Student	Ramat Gan	Season 8	11th
Noga Stanescu	נגה סטנסקו	20	Bar-Ilan University Student	Ramat Gan	Season 8	11th
Vladimir "Vova" Lazarovitch	ולדימיר "וובה" לזרוביץ'	31		Petah Tikva	Season 8	10th
Alla Aibinder	אלה אייבינדר	29		Tel Aviv	Season 8	10th
Anne Zivi	אן זיוי	24	Model & Jewelry Designer	Givatayim	Season 8	9th
Yarden Vizel	ירדן ויזל	24	Model & Designer	Givatayim	Season 8	9th
Gili Algabi	גילי אלגבי	29	Stylist	Tel Aviv	Season 8	8th
Tali Algabi	טלי אלגבי	45	Digital Marketer	Tel Aviv	Season 8	8th
Lian Wanman	ליאן וינמן	32	Fashion Website Owner	Ramat Gan	Season 8	7th
Eviatar Nagar	אביתר נגר	30	High-Tech Entrepreneur	Ramat Gan	Season 8	7th
Ashriel "Ash" Moore	אשריאל "אש" מור	27	Public Speaker	Jerusalem	Season 8	6th
Alissa "Alis" Zannou	אליסה "אליס" זאנו	24	Singer	Jerusalem	Season 8	6th
Shay Gavriel	שי גבריאל	32	Poultry Farmer	Ein Ya'akov	Season 8	5th
Shani Alon	שני אלון	31	Blogger & Entrepreneur	Ein Ya'akov	Season 8	5th
Ben Scheflan	בן שפלן	27		Tel Aviv	Season 8	4th
Ori Scheflan	אורי שפלן	24	Musician	Tel Aviv	Season 8	4th
Omer Barazani	עומר ברזני	26	Hamburger Restaurant Worker	Jerusalem	Season 8	3rd
Neta Barazani	נטע ברזני	20	Model	Jerusalem	Season 8	3rd
Netanel "Neta" Merran	נתנאל "נתא" מרן	23	Shirt Designer	Holon	Season 8	2nd
Assaf Tetro	אסף טטרו	23	Shirt Designer	Holon	Season 8	2nd
Yael Carmon	יעל כרמון	29	Dance Studio Owner	Tel Aviv	Season 8	1st
Yosiel Neeman	יוסיאל נאמן	25	Acting Student	Holon	Season 8	1st
Michal Matzov	מיכל מצוב	29	Internet Star	Haifa	Season 9	13th
Elrom Ben Avraham	אלרום בן אברהם	25	Internet Star	Petah Tikva	Season 9	13th
Shahar Elbaz	שחר אלבז	27	Former tennis player	Petah Tikva	Season 9	12th
Ronit Elbaz	רונית אלבז	56	Civics teacher	Petah Tikva	Season 9	12th
Racheli Mizrahi	רחלי מזרחי	39	Car replacement parts worker	Jerusalem	Season 9	11th
Miri Eliezer	מירי אליעזר	42	Hair stylist and makeup artist	Jerusalem	Season 9	11th
Amit Chen	עמית חן	30	Talent agent	Tel Aviv	Season 9	10th
Rotem Revivo	רותם רביבו	29	Event producer	Tel Aviv	Season 9	10th
Idan Rosen	עידן רוזן	26	Economics and management student	Petah Tikva	Season 9	9th
Guy Rosen	גיא רוזן	58	Businessman, Tnuva's vice-chairman	Petah Tikva	Season 9	9th
Hasida "Hasi" Chasson	חסידה "חסי" חסון	52		Rishon LeZion	Season 9	8th
Yarin Chasson	ירין חסון	24		Rishon LeZion	Season 9	8th
Mahmoud "Modi" Safouri	מחמוד "מודי" ספורי	46	Airport VIP worker	Bat Yam	Season 9	7th
Miki Lelov	מיקי ללוב	43	Airport VIP worker	Bat Yam	Season 9	7th
Udi Naor	אודי נאור	28		Ramat HaSharon	Season 9	6th
Matan Oved	מתן עובד	28		Ramat HaSharon	Season 9	6th
Sahar Korean	סהר קורן	29	Gym trainor	Ramat Gan	Season 9	5th
Yiftach Ramon	יפתח רמון	31	Plant nursery worker, the son of Israeli astronaut Ilan Ramon	Kfar HaNassi	Season 9	5th
Itzik Socolovski	איציק סוקולובסקי	33	Make-up brand owner	Bnei Brak	Season 9	4th
Esti Socolovski	אסתי סוקולובסקי	31	Make-up brand owner	Bnei Brak	Season 9	4th
Lior Dabach	ליאור דבח	30		Be'er Ya'akov	Season 9	3rd
Sapir Avisror	ספיר אביסרור	28		Be'er Ya'akov	Season 9	3rd
Inbar Ben Atia	ענבר בן עטיה	26	Credit card seller	Gedera	Season 9	2nd
Avishai Regev	אבישי רגב	44	Sport psychologist	Talmei Yehiel	Season 9	2nd
Lee Avrahami	לי אברהמי	22	Aesthetics worker	Tel Aviv	Season 9	1st
Anne Avrahami	אן אברהמי	23	Aesthetics worker	Tel Aviv	Season 9	1st
Reuven Lavi	ראובן לביא	59	Psychiatrist	Tel Aviv	Season 10	14th
Gali Lavi	גלי לביא	24	Economics student	Tel Aviv	Season 10	14th
Yotam Ohayon	יותם אוחיון	30	Lawyer	Be'er Sheva	Season 10	13th
Nofar Zommer	נופר זומר	30	Lawyer	Giv'atayim	Season 10	13th
Emuna Zingboim	אמונה זינגבוים	25	VP of Development, Innovation, Regulation and Quality Assurance for Hava Zingboim	Ra'anana	Season 10	12th
Nerya Zingboim	נריה זינגבוים	27	Rehab center counselor	Ra'anana	Season 10	12th
Ron Horwitz	רון הורביץ	24		Petah Tikva	Season 10	11th
Meitav Ziv	מיטב זיו	26		Giv'at Shmuel	Season 10	11th
Michal Pras	מיכל פרס	29	Model	Ramat Ef'al	Season 10	10th
Nooni Keren	נוני קרן	27	Model	Tel Aviv	Season 10	10th
Chen Drix	חן דריקס	37		Neve Yarak	Season 10	9th
Yossi Ezra	יוסי עזרא	37		Rishon LeZion	Season 10	9th
Tom Boukai	תום בוקאי	32		Herzliya	Season 10	8th
Samantha Pacino	סמנטה פצינו	32		Herzliya	Season 10	8th
Itay Rozenblit	איתי רוזנבליט	21		Ramat HaSharon	Season 10	7th
Omri Rozenblit	עמרי רוזנבליט	24		Ramat HaSharon	Season 10	7th
Sapir Harush	ספיר הרוש	30		Jerusalem	Season 10	6th
Sapir Tsemah	ספיר צמח	30		Jerusalem	Season 10	6th
Mai Hatuel	מאי חטואל	30		Herut	Season 10	5th
Itay Aon	איתי און	30		Herut	Season 10	5th
Shlomi Ifrah	שלומי יפרח	28	Actor	Ashdod	Season 10	4th
Asaf Zaga	אסף זגה	28	Actor	Be'er Sheva	Season 10	4th
Eliezer "Ezi" Buhbut	אזי בוחבוט	56		Kfar HaOranim	Season 10	3rd
Danielle "Dani" Buhbut	דני בוחבוט	26		Kfar HaOranim	Season 10	3rd
Adi Atzmi	עדי עצמי	38		Ramat Gan	Season 10	2nd
Or Ohana	אור אוחנה	38		Ramat Gan	Season 10	2nd
Tom Shelach	טום שלח	28	Footballer	Tel Aviv	Season 10	1st
Almog Ohayon	אלמוג אוחיון	30	Footballer	Nahariya	Season 10	1st

== Gallery ==
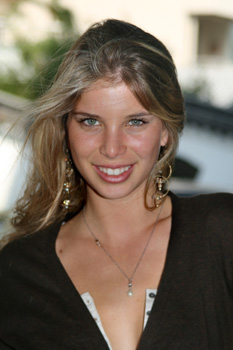
Liran Kohener from HaMerotz LaMillion 1

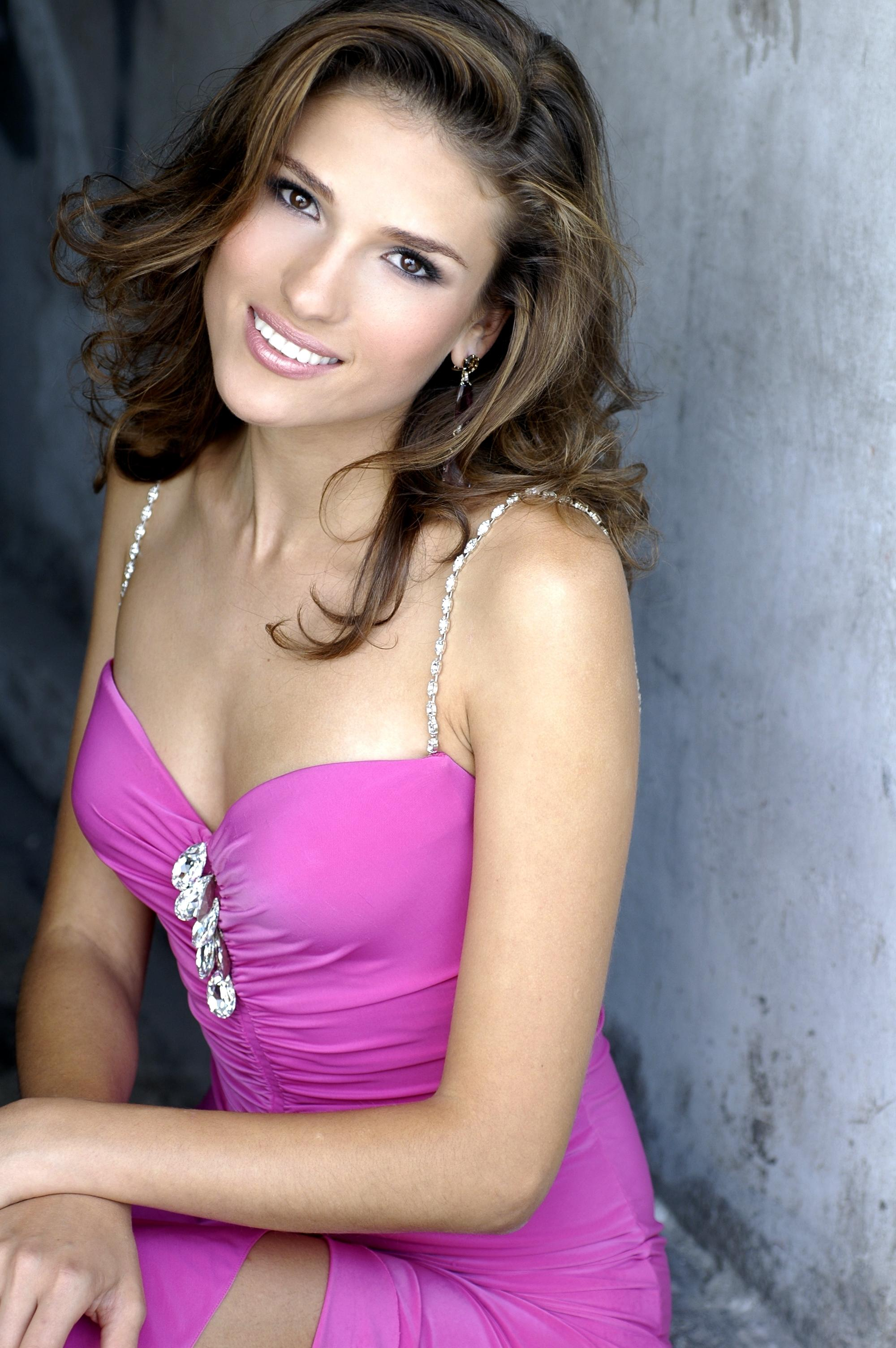
Elena Ralph from HaMerotz LaMillion 1

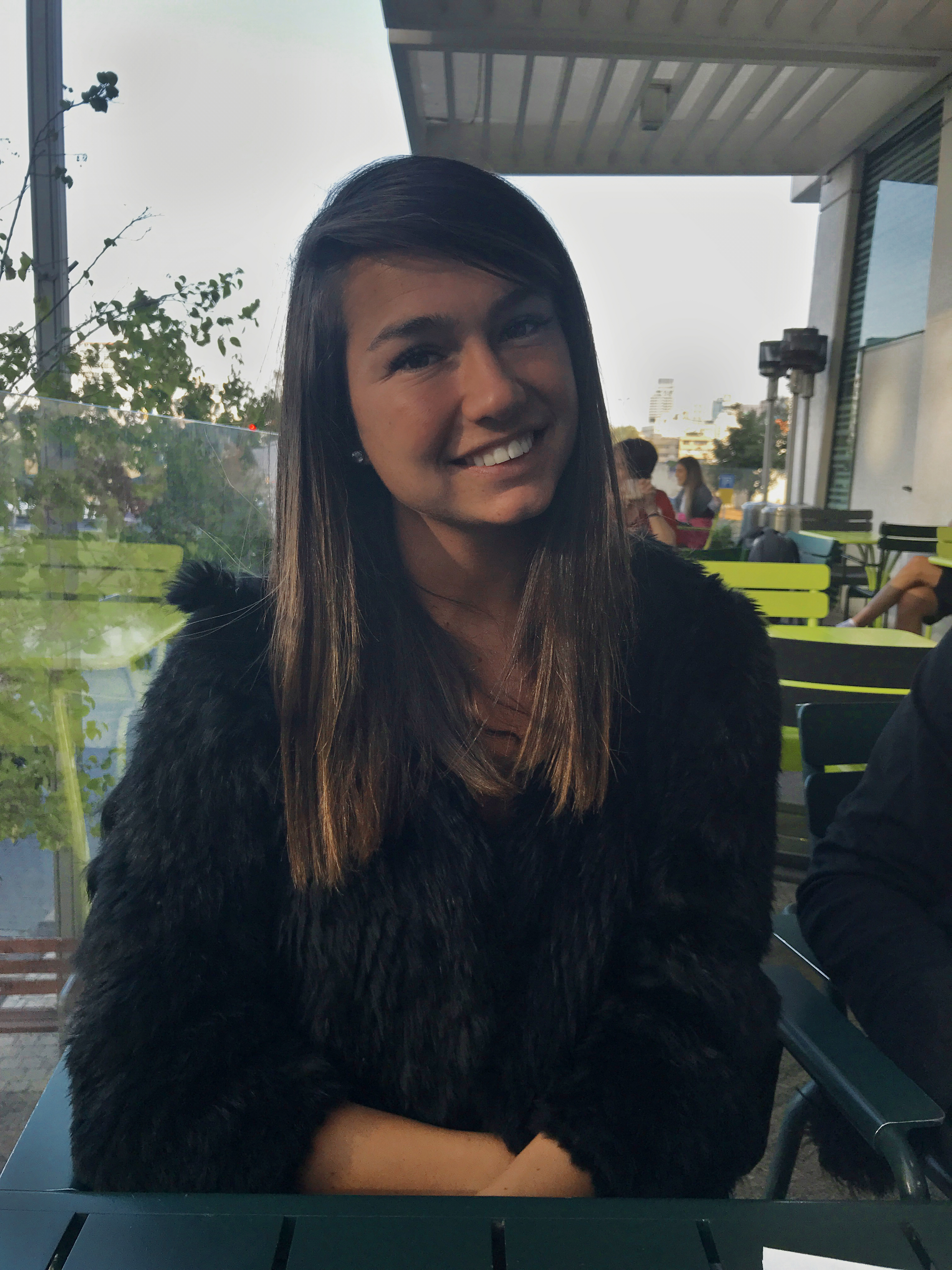
Adel Bespalov from HaMerotz LaMillion 2

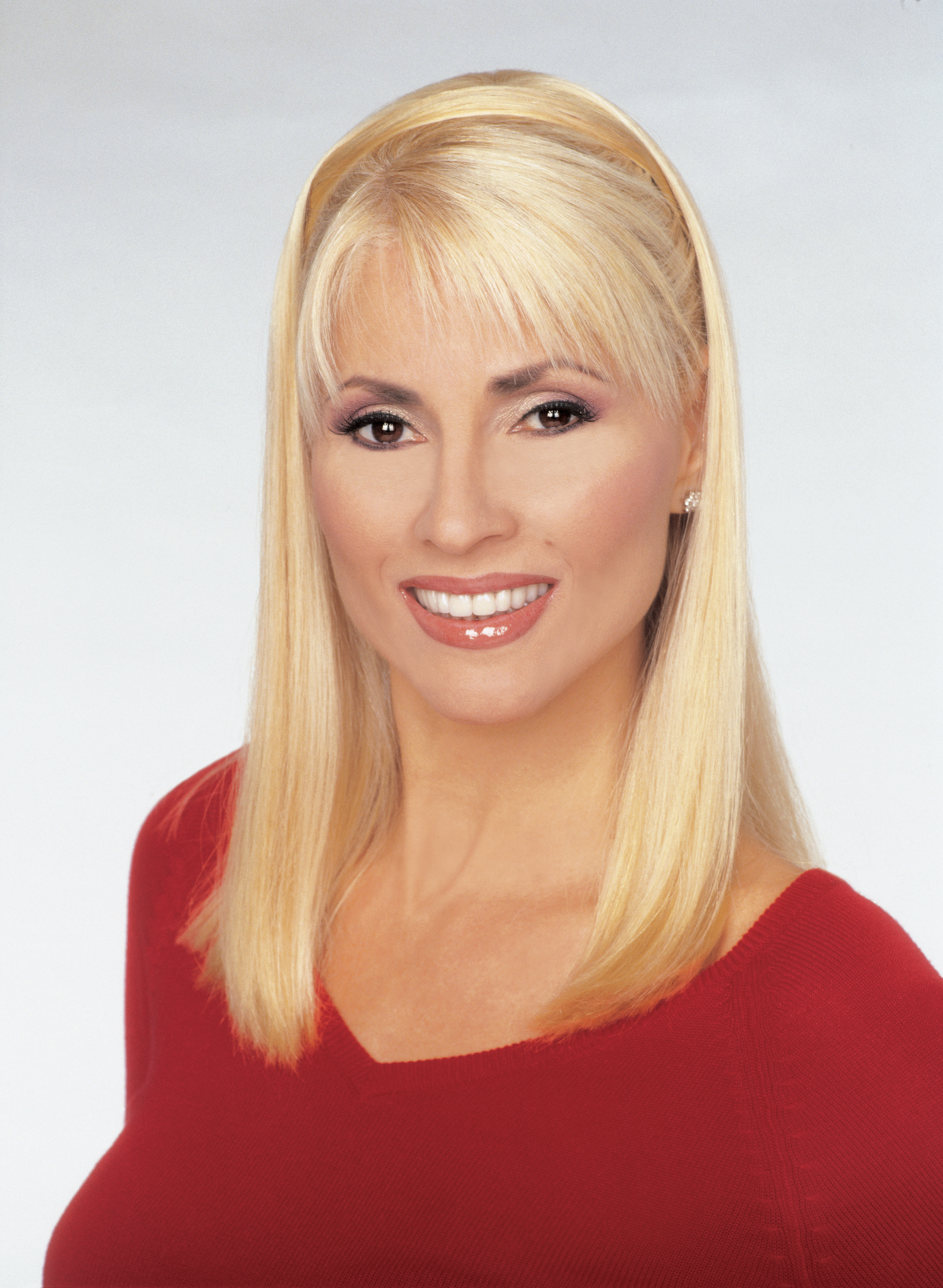
Pnina Rosenblum from HaMerotz LaMillion 4

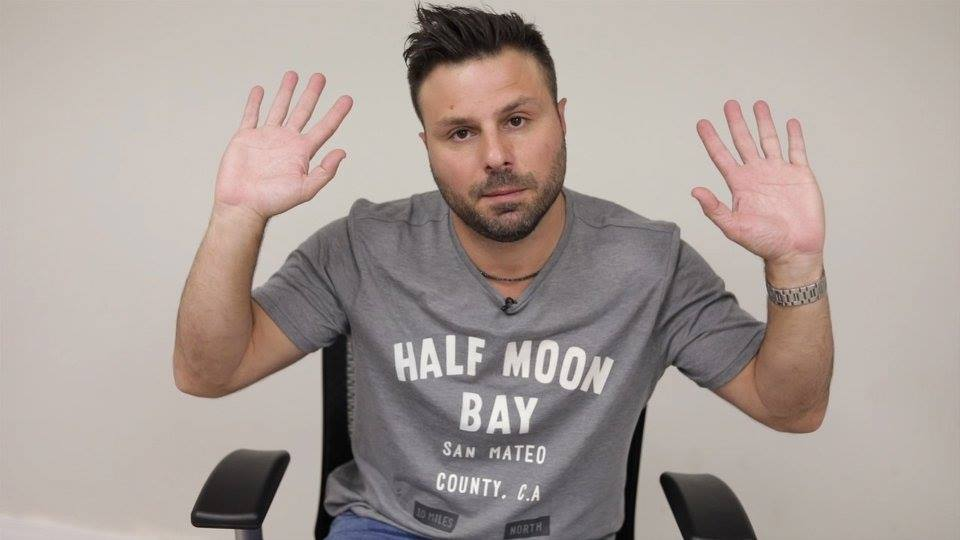
Liron "Tiltil" Urfali from HaMerotz LaMillion 4

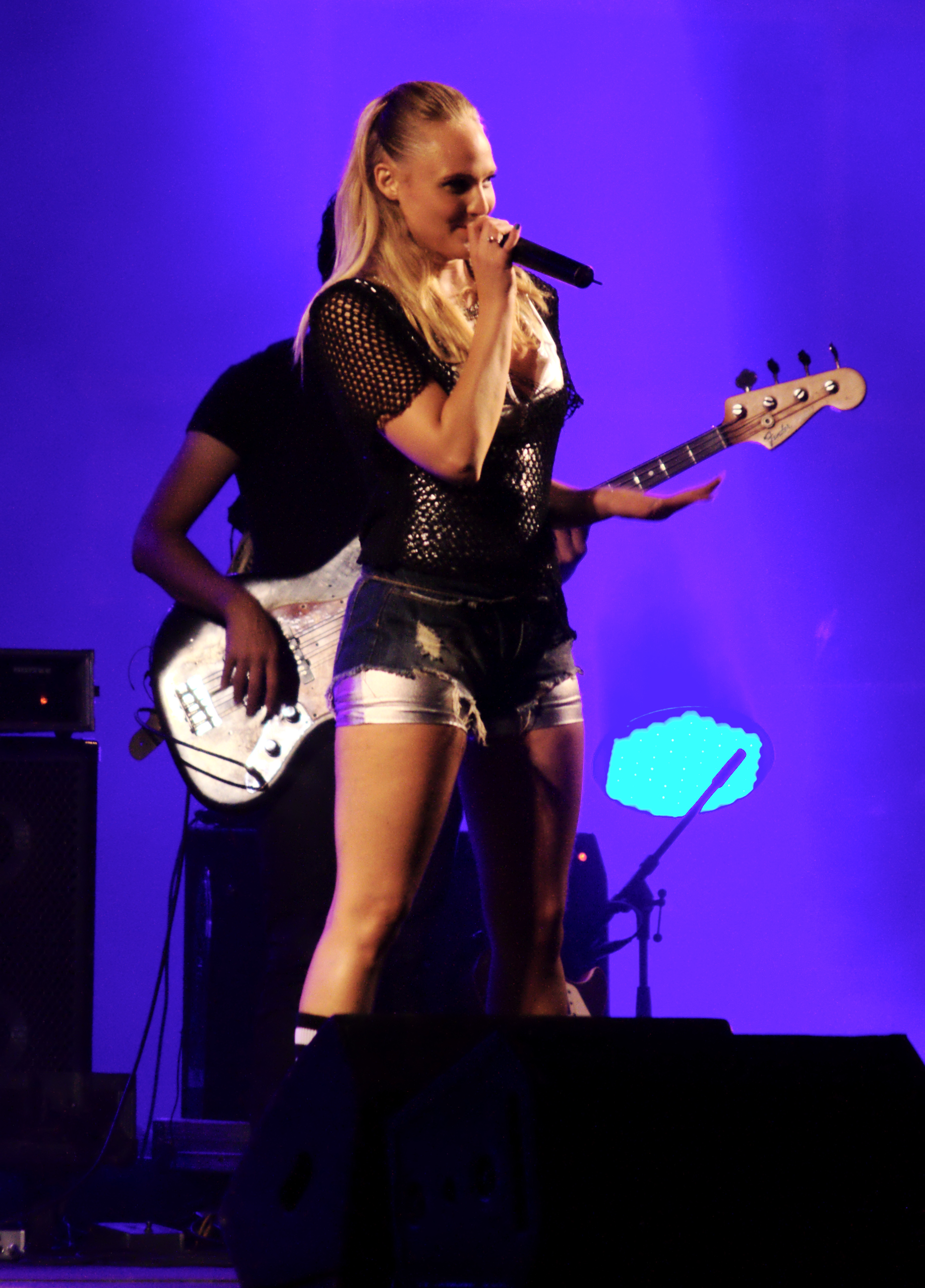
Roni Duani from HaMerotz LaMillion 4

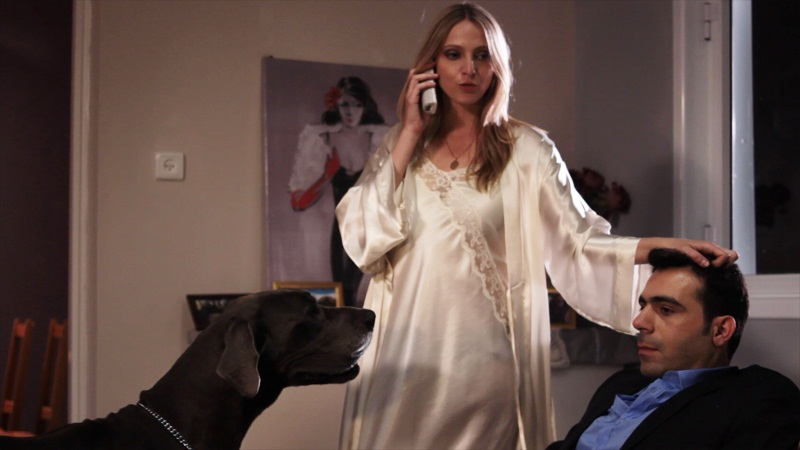
Yael Duani from HaMerotz LaMillion 4

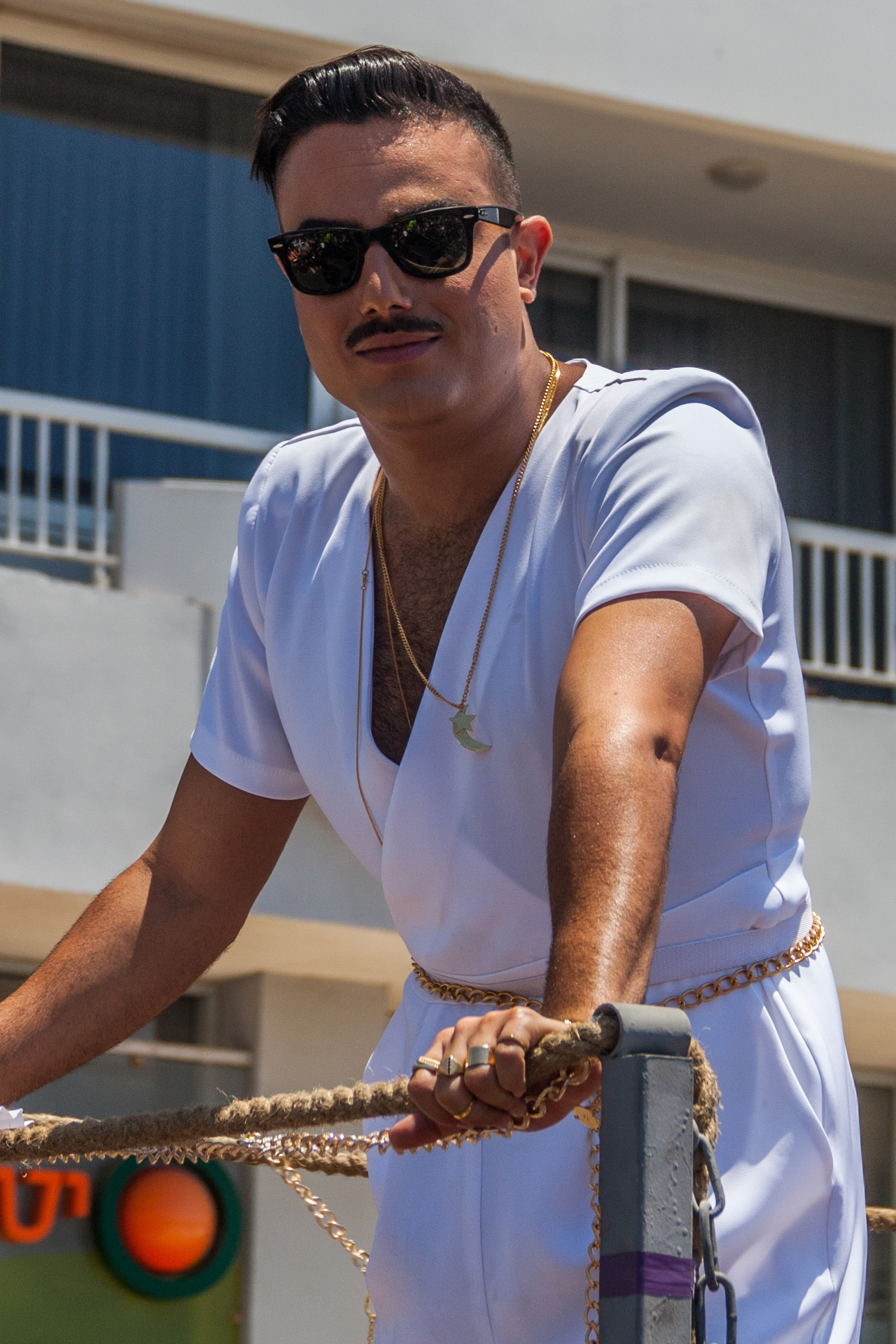
Uriel Yekutiel from HaMerotz LaMillion 4

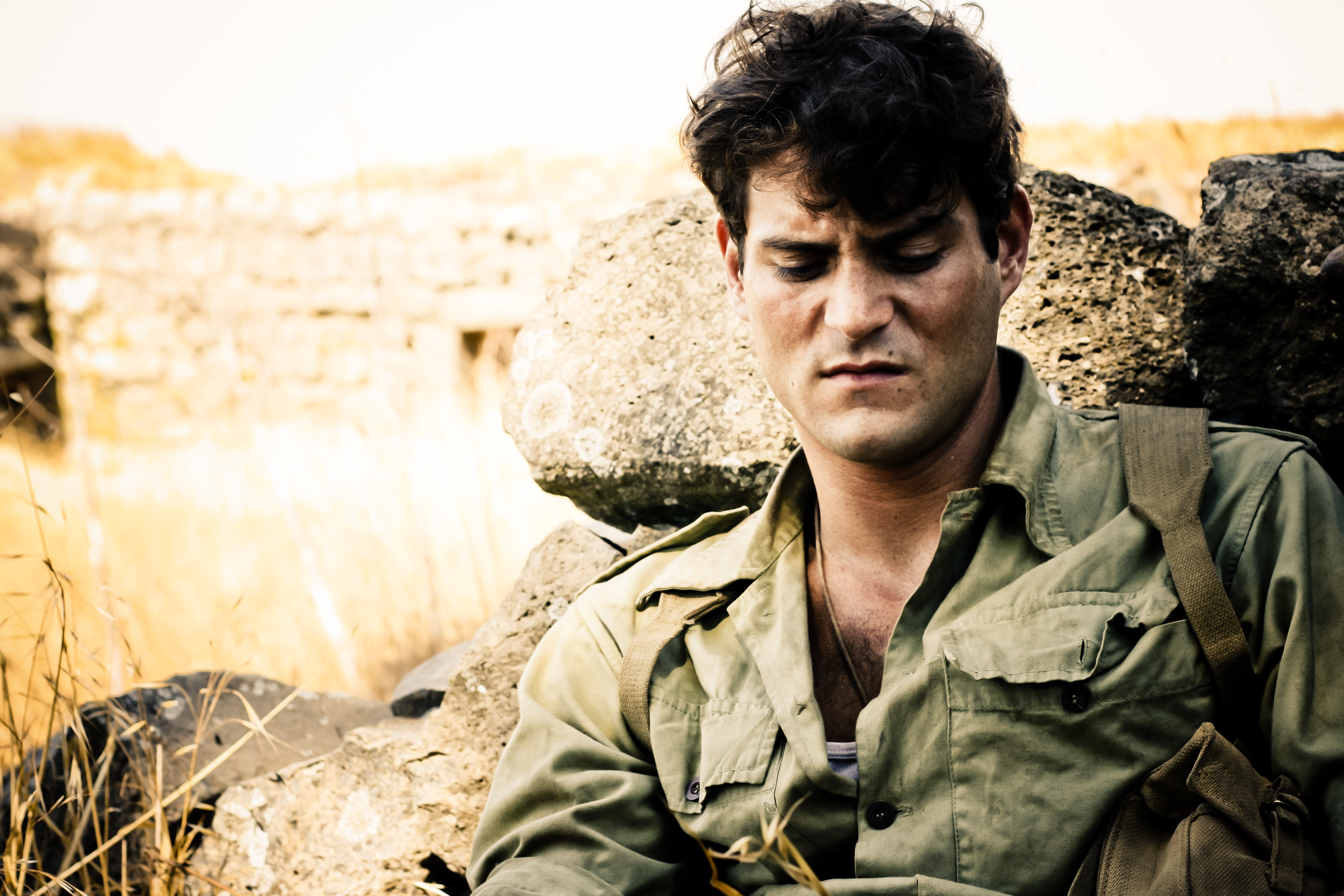
Adriano Jauvel from HaMerotz LaMillion 5

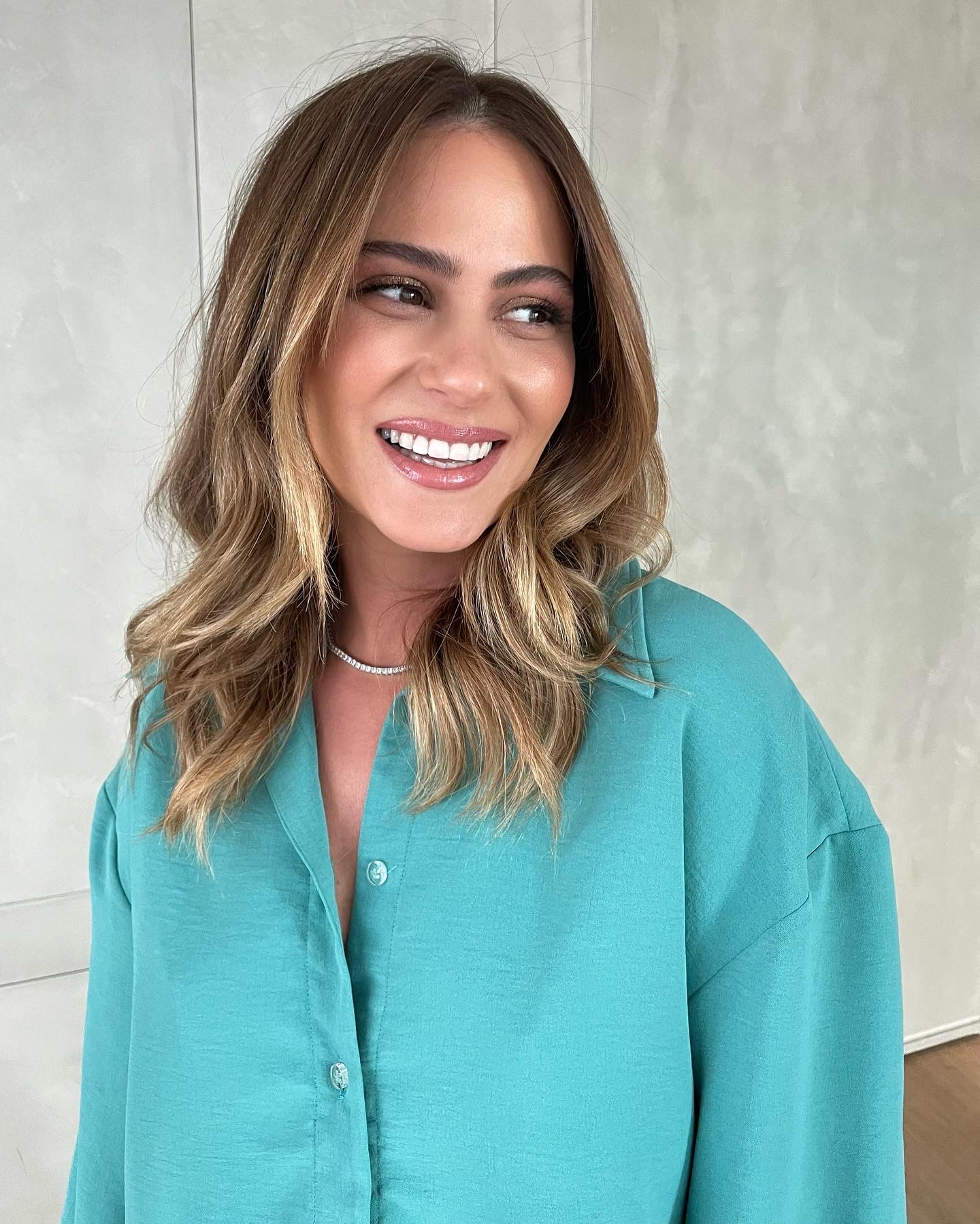
Mor Silver from HaMerotz LaMillion 6

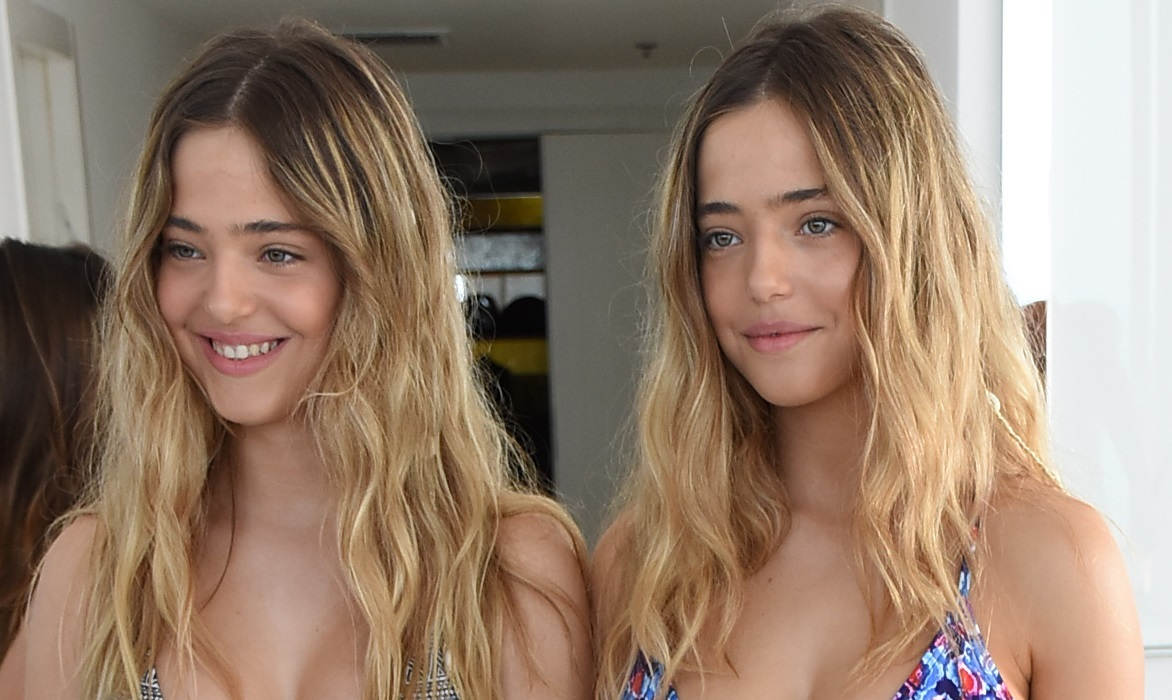
Noy and Hadar Karako from HaMerotz LaMillion 7

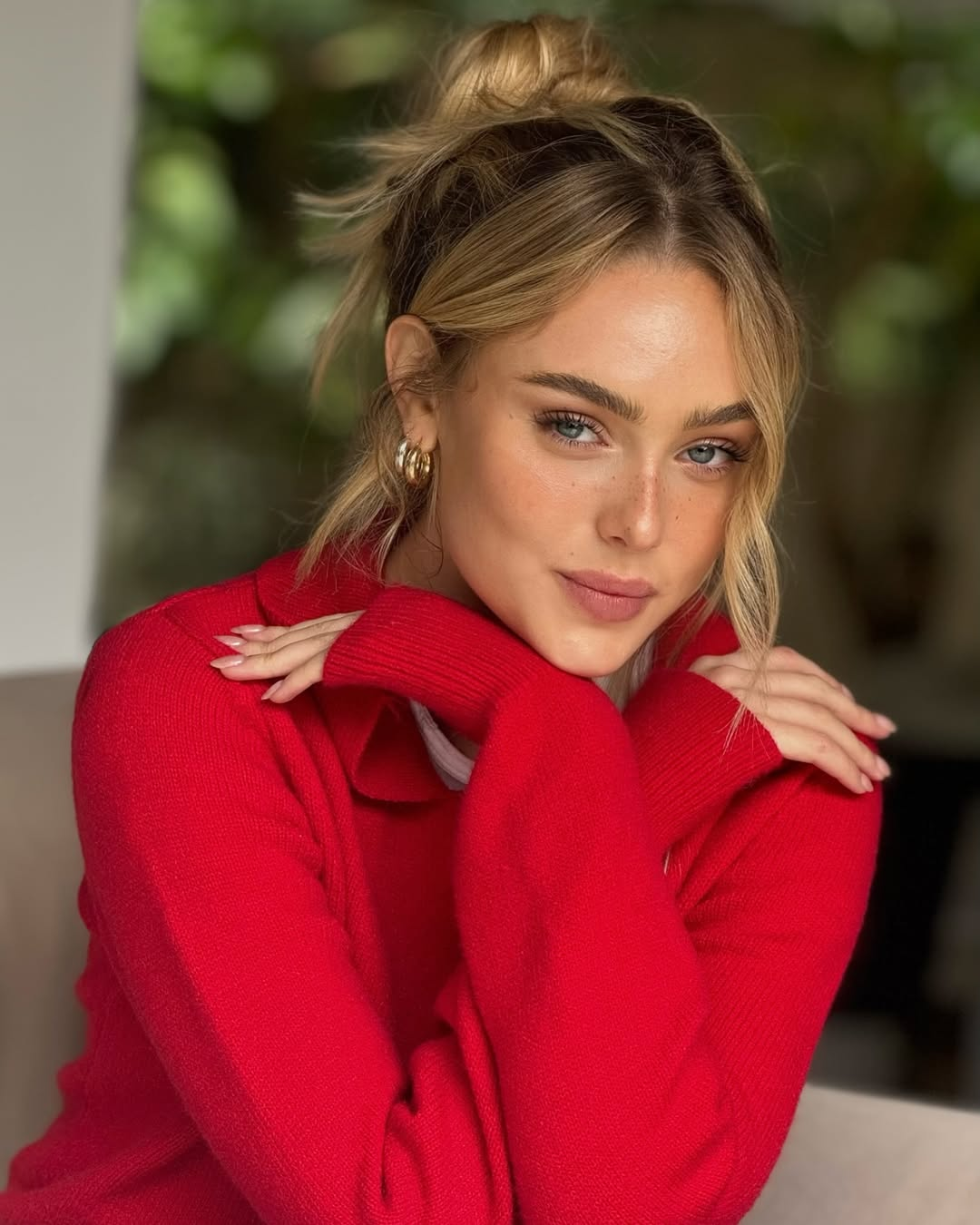
Omer Nudelman from HaMerotz LaMillion 7

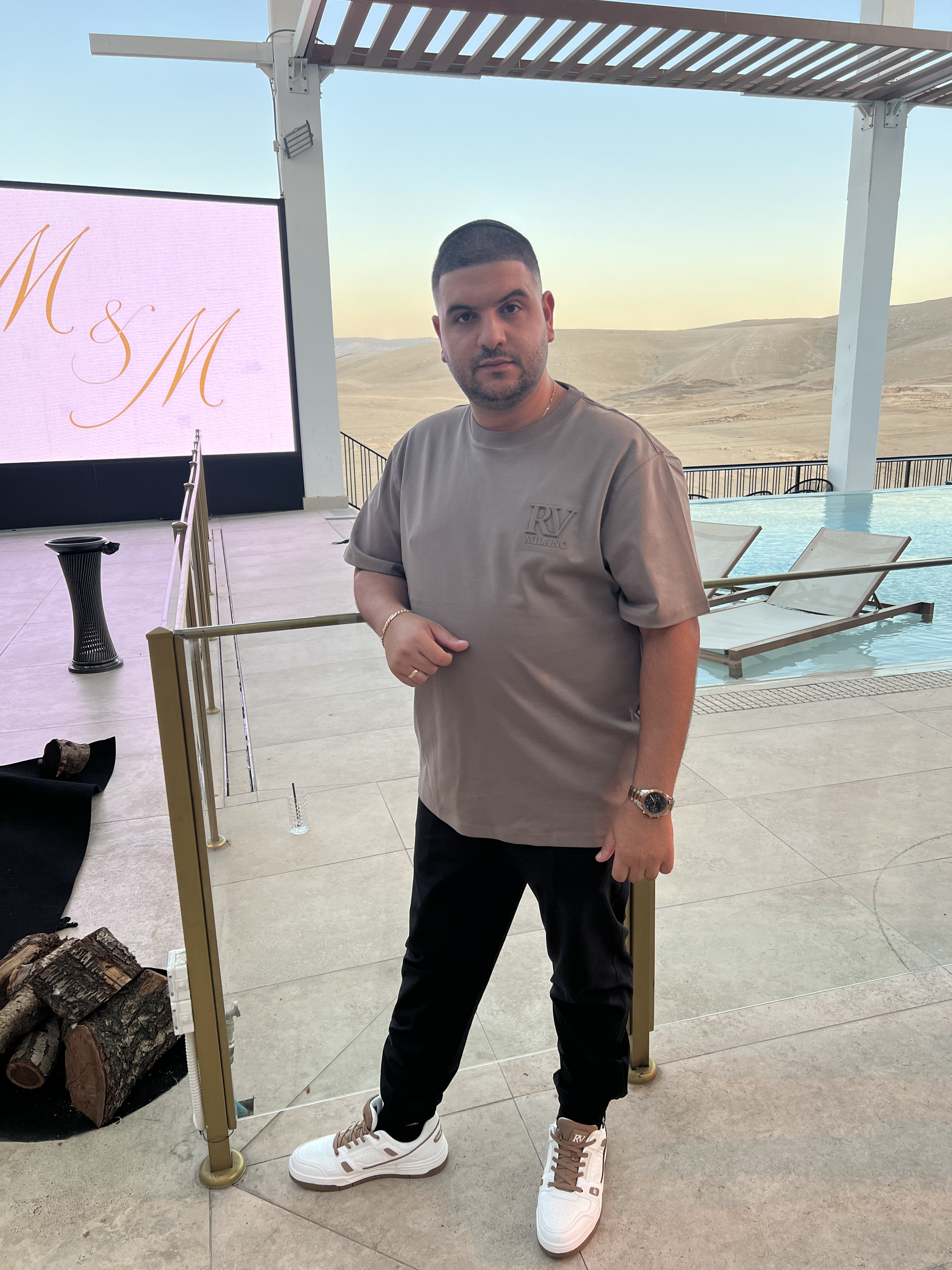
Shlomi Ifrah from HaMerotz LaMillion 10
