= Kragga Kamma Game Park =

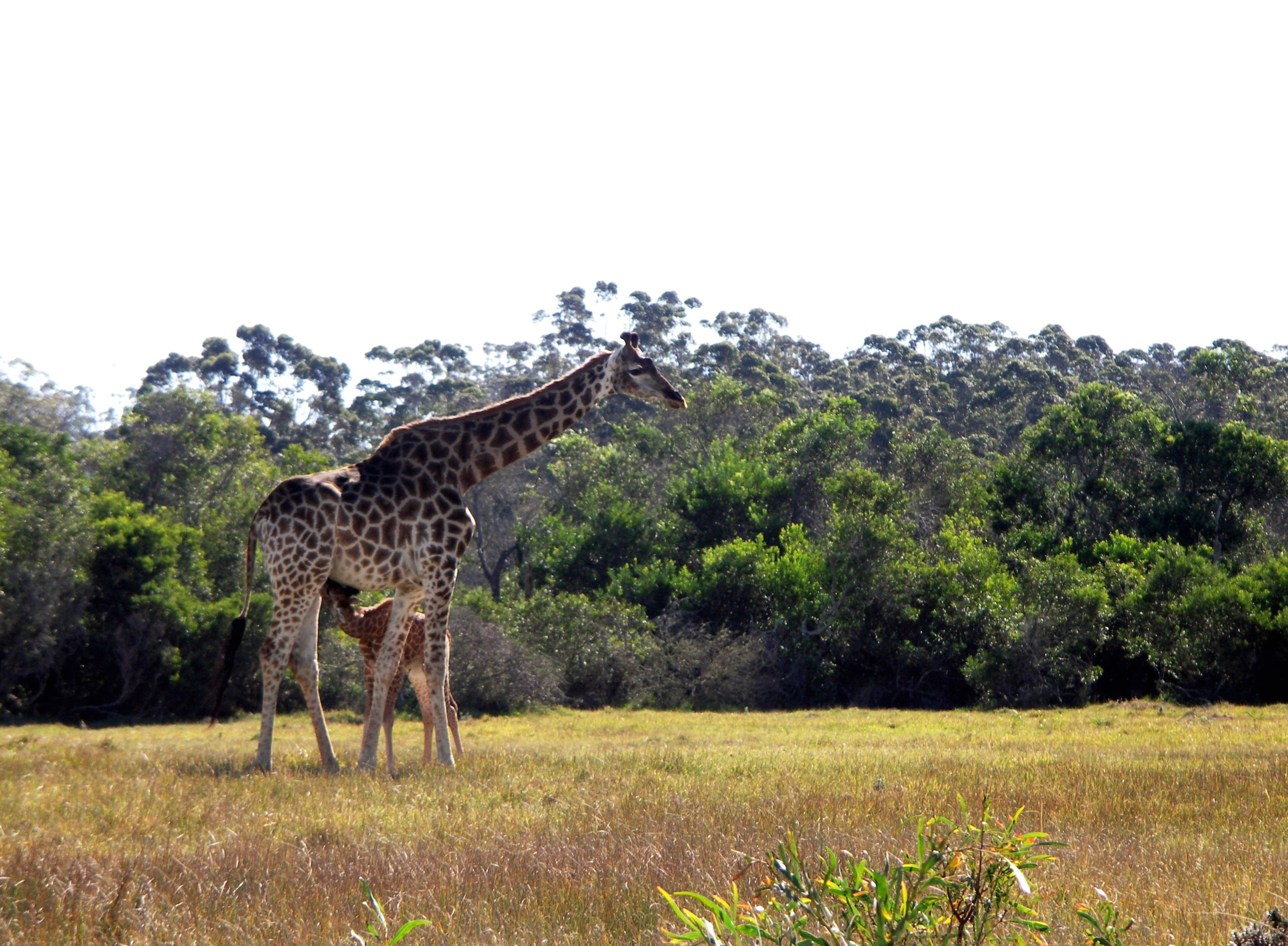
- South African giraffe calf suckling on mother

- Location within Eastern Cape
- Location: Eastern Cape, South Africa
- Nearest city: Port Elizabeth
- Coordinates: 33°59′17″S 25°27′25″E
- Area: 203 ha (500 acres)
- Established: 2001
- Visitors: 50 000 (in 2010)
- Governing body: Private Ownership
- Website: www.kraggakamma.com

The Kragga Kamma Game Park is a small reserve within the Nelson Mandela Bay Municipality in the Eastern Cape, South Africa.

One of the cheetahs featured in the movie Duma used to reside at Kragga Kamma. He died towards the end of November 2011 from kidney failure which is not unusual for wild cats in captivity.

The first leg of HaMerotz LaMillion 1 and the fourth leg of The Amazing Race Australia 1 included a visit to Kragga Kamma.

== Fauna ==
The Kragga Kamma Game Park is home to the southern white rhinoceros, South African cheetah, Burchell's zebra, South African giraffe, nyala, bontebok, lechwe and African buffalo.
