= HaMerotz LaMillion 1 =

- Season 1
- Presented by: Raz Meirman
- No. of teams: 10
- Winners: Shay Kahana & Guy Osadon
- No. of legs: 10
- Distance traveled: 42,000 km (26,000 mi)
- No. of episodes: 20 (22 including recaps)

Release
- Original network: Channel 2
- Original release: 5 February – 11 June 2009

Additional information
- Filming dates: November 2008 – December 2008, 30 May 2009

Series chronology
- Next → Season 2

HaMerotz LaMillion 1 is the first season of HaMerotz LaMillion (Hebrew: המירוץ למיליון, lit. The Race to the Million), an Israeli reality competition show based on the American series The Amazing Race. Hosted by Raz Meirman, it featured ten teams of two, each with a pre-existing relationship, in a race around the Eastern Hemisphere to win ₪1,000,000. This season visited three continents and seven countries and traveled over 42,000 kilometres (26,000 mi) during ten legs. Starting in Kfar Truman, racers traveled through Israel, South Africa, Vietnam, Japan, Macau, Hong Kong, Australia, and New Zealand before finishing in Otago. This season premiered on 5 February 2009 on Channel 2 with the finale airing on 11 June 2009.

Business partners Shay Kahana and Guy Osadon were the winners of this season, while dating couple Maya Kramer and Amichay Gat finished in second place, and stepdaughter and stepfather Tom Kilman and Gil Kislev finished in third place.

== Production ==
=== Development and filming ===
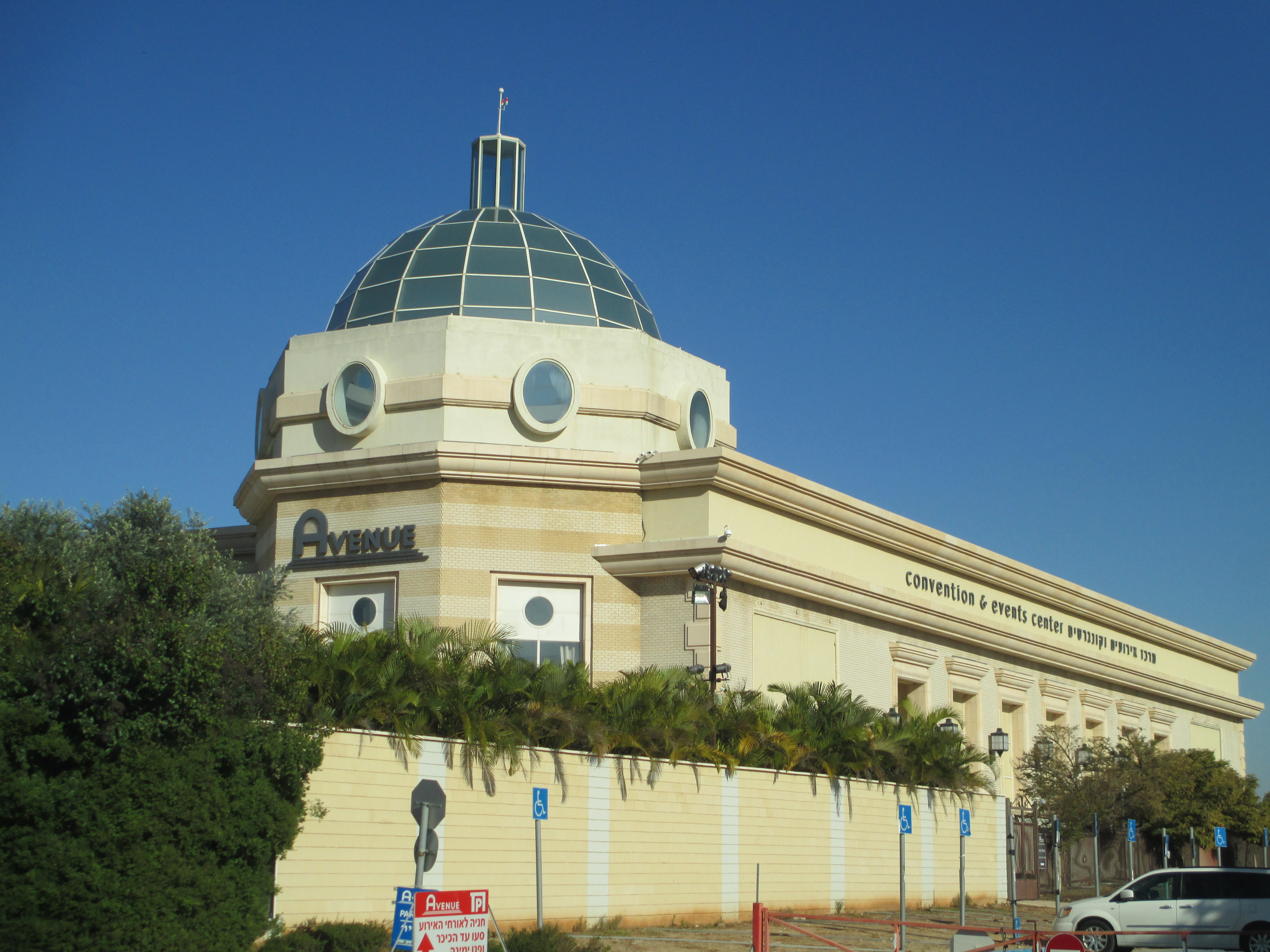
Avenue Hall near Ben Gurion Airport was the very first Starting Line of HaMerotz LaMillion.

On 8 April 2008, Disney-ABC International Television announced that it granted the license for Reshet to produce an Israeli version of The Amazing Race.

Much like the American and Asian franchises, route markers were colored yellow and white in Vietnam to avoid confusion with the former flag of South Vietnam. Differing from most of the other franchises of the series, the last leg was not filmed back-to-back with the previous legs. On 30 May 2009, months after the penultimate leg had been filmed and during the broadcast of the actual show, teams were flown to the final destination to film the final leg. The theme song was also different than the original American version's theme song with Israeli-style music. The song was mostly used throughout the series ever since the first season.

Graham Keating, Sydney, Australia's town crier, served as the Pit Stop greeter during Leg 8. He previously appeared as a greeter during The Amazing Race 2.

== Cast ==
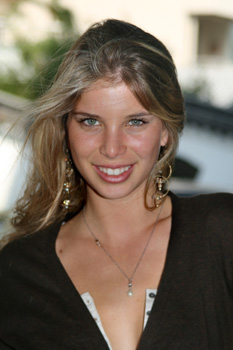
Liran Kohener

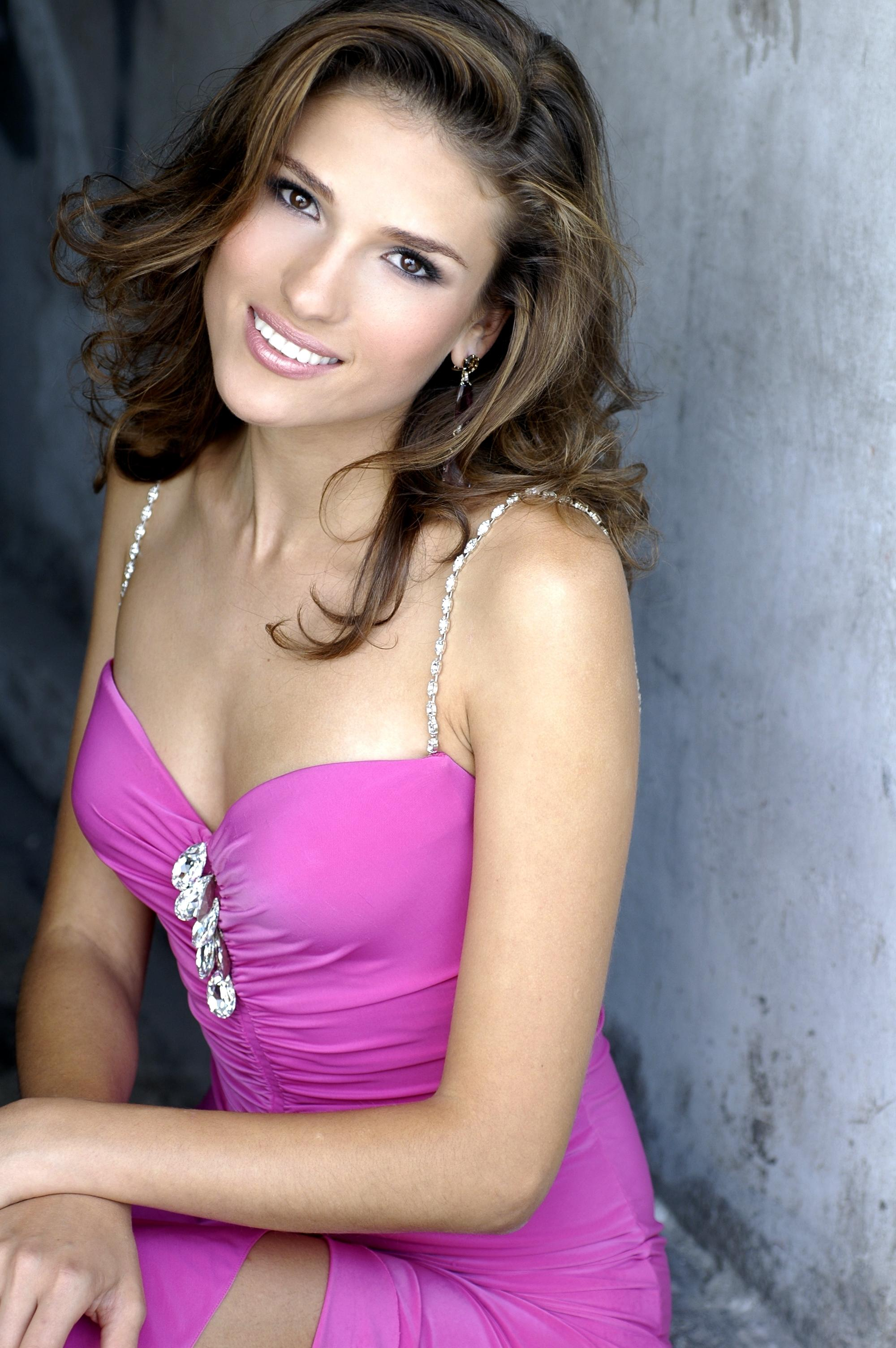
Elena Ralph

The cast for this season included retired beauty queens Liran Kohner and Elena Ralph as well as the son of singer Ilanit, Amichay Gat.

Maya & Amichay separated not long after the season aired, and Maya married Israeli actor Ron Shahar, who would become the show's new host in 2011, on 28 August 2010. The couple had one daughter and separated April 2019.

Contestants	Age	Relationship	Hometown	Status
Liran Kohener (לירן)	20	Beauty Queens	Rishon LeZion	Eliminated 1st (in Cape Town, South Africa)
Elena Ralph (ילנה)	24	Beauty Queens	Ramat Gan	Eliminated 1st (in Cape Town, South Africa)
Asher Donsoili (אשר)	24	Childhood Friends	Ashdod	Eliminated 2nd (in Ho Chi Minh City, Vietnam)
Maor Glam (מאור)	24	Childhood Friends	Ashdod	Eliminated 2nd (in Ho Chi Minh City, Vietnam)
Alen Bilig (אלן)	32	Exes	Tel Aviv	Eliminated 3rd (in Vũng Tàu, Vietnam)
Inbal Harel (ענבל)	26	Exes	Tel Aviv	Eliminated 3rd (in Vũng Tàu, Vietnam)
Hannah Shaham (חנה)	55	Kibbutz Members	Ashdot Ya'akov	Medically Removed (in Tokyo, Japan)
Margalit Koenig (מרגלית)	62	Kibbutz Members	Dganya Bet	Medically Removed (in Tokyo, Japan)
Eliana Turgeman (אליאנה)	33	Importer & Fashion Designer	Tel Aviv	Eliminated 4th (in Macau)
Yael Ambar (יעל)	32	Importer & Fashion Designer	Ramat Hasharon	Eliminated 4th (in Macau)
Hadas Federman (הדס)	24	Friends	Herzliya	Eliminated 5th (in Sydney, Australia)
Inbal Shelevi (ענבל)	24	Friends	Herzliya	Eliminated 5th (in Sydney, Australia)
Michal Shaviv (מיכל)	35	Married with 3 Children	Or Yehuda	Eliminated 6th (in Auckland, New Zealand)
Ran Shaviv (רן)	39	Married with 3 Children	Or Yehuda	Eliminated 6th (in Auckland, New Zealand)
Tom Kilman (תום)	54	Stepfather & Stepdaughter	Herzliya	Third Place
Gil Kislev (גיל)	25	Stepfather & Stepdaughter	Herzliya	Third Place
Maya Kramer (מיה)	30	Dating	Tel Aviv	Second Place
Amichay Gat (עמיחי)	33	Dating	Tel Aviv	Second Place
Shay Kahana (שי)	32	Business Partners	Tel Aviv	Winners
Guy Osadon (גיא)	30	Business Partners	Tel Aviv	Winners

=== Future appearances ===
In 2014, Maya Kramer competed with future HaMerotz LaMillion host Ron Shahar on the game show Raid the Cage.

== Results ==
The following teams participated in this season, with their relationships at the time of filming. Note that this table is not necessarily reflective of all content broadcast on television due to inclusion or exclusion of some data. Placements are listed in finishing order:

Team	Position (by leg)										Roadblocks performed
Team	1	2	3	4	5	6	7	8	9	10	Roadblocks performed
Shay & Guy	7th	2nd	2nd	5th	4th	1st	1stƒ	2nd⊃	2nd	1st	Shay 5, Guy 5
Maya & Amichay	1st	1st	3rd	1st	1st	3rd	4th⊂	3rd	3rd	2nd	Maya 4, Amichay 6
Tom & Gil	5th	4th	4th	4th	6th	2nd	2nd	4th^{3}	1st	3rd	Tom 5, Gil 5
Michal & Ran	3rd	3rd	5th	2nd	2nd	5th	3rd⊃	1st	4th		Michal 4, Ran 5
Hadas & Inbal	4th	8th	7th	3rd	3rd^{1}	4th	5th	5th⊂^{4}			Hadas 4, Inbal 4
Eliana & Yael	2nd	6th	6th	6th	5th	6th					Eliana 3, Yael 3
Hannah & Margalit	9th	9th	1stƒ	7th>	7th^{2}						Hannah 2, Margalit 1
Alen & Inbal	8th	5th	8th	8th<							Alen 2, Inbal 2
Maor & Asher	10th	7th	9th								Maor 0, Asher 3
Liran & Elena	6th	10th									Liran 1, Elena 1

Key

- A red team placement indicates that the team was eliminated.
- A green ƒ indicates that the team won a Fast Forward.
- A blue team placement indicates that the team was the last to arrive at a Pit Stop in a non-elimination leg.
  - An underlined blue placement indicates that the team was forced to relinquish all of their money and belongings (except for passports and the clothes on their back) for the remainder of the season. In addition, they were not allotted money for the next leg and were not allowed to collect money until the next leg started for them.
  - An italicized blue placement indicates that the team was "marked for elimination"; if the team did not place 1st in the next leg, they would receive a 30-minute penalty.
- A yellow > indicates that the team chose to use the Yield; < indicates the team who received it.
- A brown ⊃ indicates that the team chose to use a U-Turn; ⊂ indicates the team who received it.

Notes

1. Hadas & Inbal left the Pit Stop in Vũng Tàu in last place at the start of Leg 5 because they accidentally slept in.
2. Hannah & Margalit were unable to complete the leg because Margalit was hospitalized due to a severe abdominal infection that she began suffering during the flight to Tokyo. Raz Meirman met them at the hospital, where they were eliminated.
3. Tom & Gil initially arrived 4th, but took a taxi instead of walking to the Pit Stop. They were forced to go back to the Orient Hotel and then walk back to the Pit Stop. This did not affect their placement.
4. Hadas & Inbal had been "marked for elimination"; however, since they arrived last, they were eliminated without being issued the 30-minute penalty.

== Prizes ==
- Leg 2 – A stay at a luxurious suite during the Pit Stop, where delicacies and wine would be served.
- Leg 3 – A massage for each team member during the Pit Stop.
- Leg 4 – A Vietnamese meal served during the Pit Stop, which the winners could invite another team to join them.
- Leg 5 – A traditional Japanese massage for each team member at local hot springs during the Pit Stop.
- Leg 6 – A stay at a luxurious suite in The Venetian Macao during the Pit Stop, while all other teams slept at a simple hotel.
- Leg 7 – A Harel Relax credit card loaded with $6000, which the winners could use during the Pit Stop to purchase souvenirs and gifts to send back home.
- Leg 8 – A stay at a luxurious suite at the Hilton hotel during the Pit Stop, plus a limo ride to a restaurant to enjoy a high-quality dinner for two.
- Leg 9 – A phone call home, which could optionally be donated to another team.
- Leg 10:
  - 1st Place – ₪1,000,000 and two Honda Civic Hybrids
  - 2nd Place – A European spa vacation.
  - 3rd Place – A summer vacation in Israel.

== Race summary ==
Route Map

Destinations	Air travel Rail travel Water travel Bus travel Helicopter travel Bicycle travel Gondola travel
Route Markers	צומת (Detour) מחסום (Roadblock) קיצור דרך (Fast Forward) עצור (Yield) סיבוב פרסה (U-Turn) נקודת סיום (Pit Stop)

=== Leg 1 (Israel → South Africa) ===
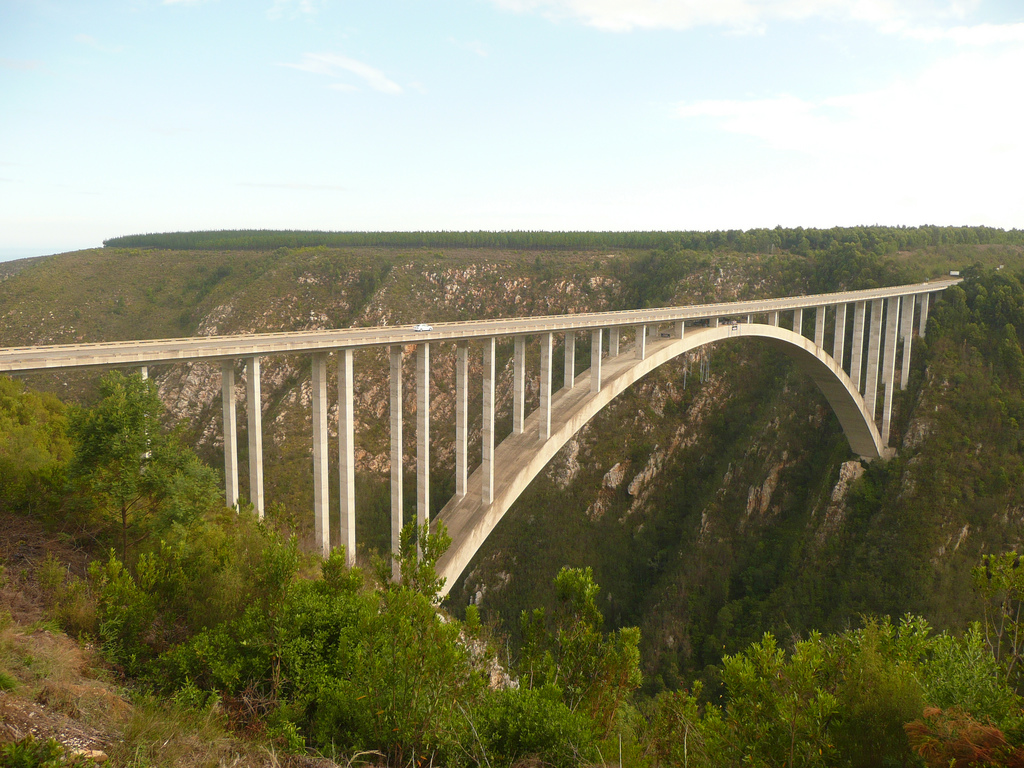
One team member had to bungee jump from Bloukrans Bridge in South Africa for the show's first Roadblock.

- Episode 1 (5 February 2009) & Episode 2 (12 February 2009)
- Prize: A stay at a hunting lodge during the Pit Stop, while all other teams slept in tents.

Locations

- Kfar Truman, Israel (Avenue Hall) (Starting Line)
- Lod (Ben Gurion Airport – Terminal 3 Issta Stand)
- Lod (Ben Gurion Airport) → Port Elizabeth, South Africa (Port Elizabeth International Airport)
- Port Elizabeth (Kragga Kamma Game Park)
- Nomathamsanqa (Fruit Stand)
- Tsitsikamma National Park (Tsitsikamma Falls Adventures) (Overnight Rest)
- Garden Route National Park (Khoisan Village)
- Garden Route National Park (Bloukrans Bridge)
- Stormsrivier (Storms River Mouth)

Episode summary (Episode 1)

- Teams set off from Avenue Hall in Kfar Truman and were instructed to travel on foot to Ben Gurion Airport. There, teams had to find an Issta stand and randomly pick one of ten envelopes containing tickets for one of two flights to Port Elizabeth, South Africa, each with seats for five teams and arriving two hours apart. Once there, teams had to find a marked car with their next clue, which instructed them to drive to Kragga Kamma Game Park, follow a marked course over swamps, attach a log to their car using a rope, then drag the log with their car to the end of the course in order to receive their next clue.
- Teams drove to Nomathamsanqa and had to find their next clue at a fruit stand. Both team members had to carry a basket of fruit on their head to the Sangoma without dropping anything in order to receive their next clue. Teams then drove to Tsitsikamma Falls Adventures, where they spent the night.

Episode summary (Episode 2)

- This series' first Detour was a choice between Water (מים – Meym) or Sky (שמים – Shemeym). In Water, teams had to rappel down a waterfall and add up the three numbers posted on the side in order to receive their next clue. In Sky, teams had to ride a zipline in order to receive their next clue.
- After the Detour, teams had to drive to the Khoisan Village and throw a tribal weapon known as an "Intonga" to break a pot held up by rope in order to receive their next clue.
- In this series' first Roadblock, one team member had to perform the world's highest bridge bungee jump off of the Bloukrans Bridge in order to receive their next clue.
- After the Roadblock, teams had to drive to the Storms River Mouth and correctly build a tent to sleep in for the night before they could run to the nearby Pit Stop.

Additional note

- This was a non-elimination leg.

=== Leg 2 (South Africa) ===
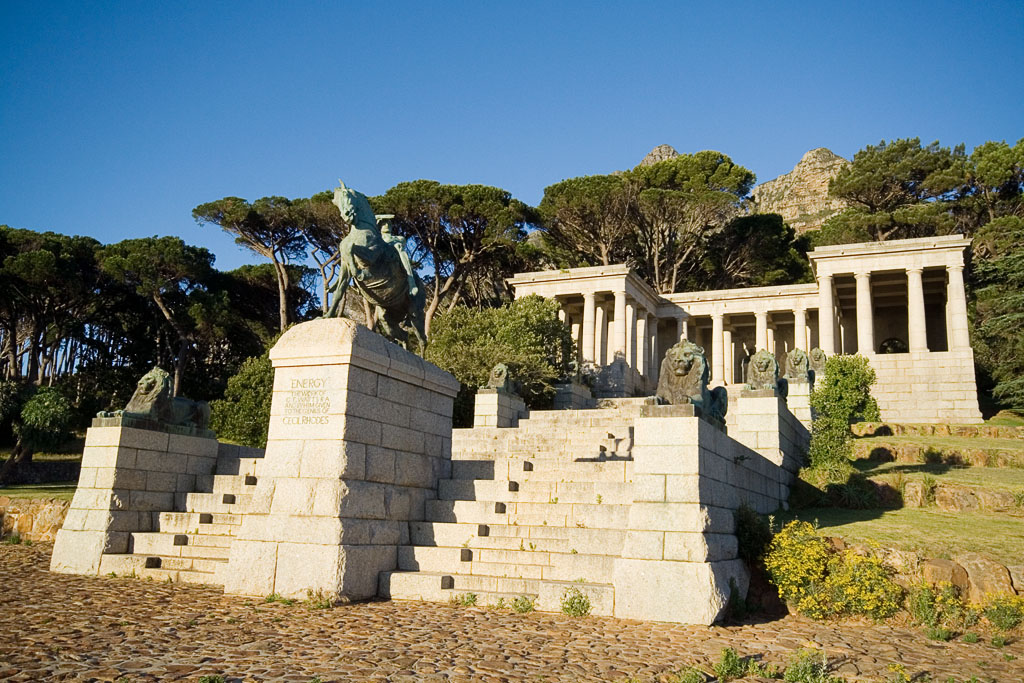
The Rhodes Memorial in Cape Town was the season's second Pit Stop.

Airdates: 19 & 26 February 2009

- Port Elizabeth (Port Elizabeth International Airport) to Cape Town (Cape Town International Airport)
- Cape Town (Table Mountain)
- Paarl (Nelson Wine Estate or Valley Gun Club)
- Atlantis (Atlantis Dunes)
- Cape Town (Killarney Motor Racing Complex)
- Cape Town (Langa – Rubber Cash Store)
- Cape Town (Langa – Tabani Street)
- Cape Town (Victoria & Alfred Waterfront – Nobel Square)
- Cape Town (Rhodes Memorial)

This leg's Detour was a choice between דרך היין (Derkh HaYayn – Wine Road) or דרך הכוונת (Derkh Hekhvenet – Through the Sight). In Wine Road, teams had to drive themselves to Nelson Wine Estate and bring an empty barrel uphill to a wine vat. Then, they had to use buckets to fill their barrel with 400 litres (110 US gal) of wine to receive their next clue. In Through the Sight, teams had to drive themselves to Valley Gun Club. There, one team member had to launch clay targets while their partner had to use a shotgun to shoot down six targets to receive their next clue.

In this leg's Roadblock, one team member had to drive a Formula One car on the Killarney race track and complete four laps with an average lap-time of two minutes or less to receive their next clue. If team members could not complete the task within the allotted time, then they had to serve a five-minute penalty before making another attempt.

Additional tasks

- At Atlantis Dunes, both team members had to slide down the dune on a sandboard through a set of flags at the bottom of the dune to receive their next clue.
- At Rubber Cash Store, the shopkeeper would give teams a bag of Epsom salt and their next clue, which instructed teams to pick up two "Smileys" (sheep heads) outside the store and bring them to Tabani Street. There, teams had to eat a roasted head to receive their next clue.
- At Nobel Square, teams had to perform a local gumboot dance with a troupe of dancers and earn R30 to receive their next clue.

=== Leg 3 (South Africa → Vietnam) ===
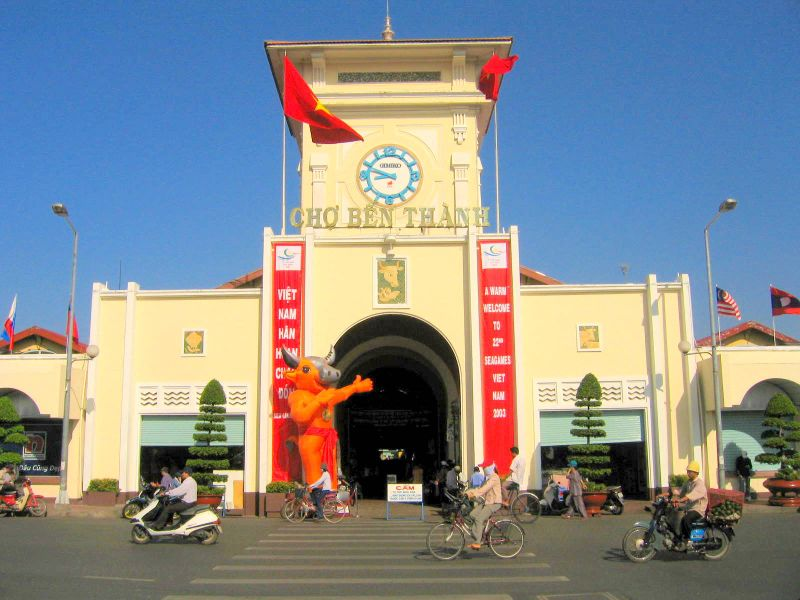
In Leg 3, teams had to go to Bến Thành Market and sell flowers to locals.

Airdates: 5 & 7 March 2009

- Cape Town (Cape Town International Airport) to Ho Chi Minh City, Vietnam (Tan Son Nhat International Airport)
- Ho Chi Minh City (Bến Thành Market)
- Cai Lậy (Mr. Tư Hải's Rice Field)
  - Cái Bè (Tân Vinh Restaurant)
- Cái Bè (Bằng Chicken Farm)
- Cái Bè (Cái Bè Land Market)
- Mỹ Tho (Trại Rắn Đồng Tâm)
- Ho Chi Minh City (Nha Tian Theatre)
- Ho Chi Minh City (Saigon Zoo and Botanical Gardens) (Note: Shay & Guy and Maya & Amichay were shown reading the clue directing them to the Pit Stop outside the gate of the Saigon Zoo at 38:16, Amichay instructed a taxi driver to go to the zoo at 44:11, and Asher instructed a taxi driver to go to the zoo after leaving the theatre at 55:36. It is unknown what task was performed there.) (Unaired)
- Ho Chi Minh City (Temple of Hùng King)

This leg's Detour was a choice between בוץ (Botz – Swamp) or קפוץ (Qefots – Jump). In Swamp, teams had to complete a swamp obstacle course to retrieve their next clue. In Jump, teams had to cross a river by jumping across five large lily pad-shaped floating platforms without falling into the water to receive their next clue.

For this series' first Fast Forward, one team had to travel to Tân Vinh Restaurant, where they would discover that each team member had to eat a serving of roasted vole to win the Fast Forward award.

In this leg's Roadblock, one team member had to collect five snakes from an enclosure and transport them into a nearby bucket to receive their next clue.

Additional tasks

- At Bến Thành Market, teams had to sell 30 flower bouquets to locals on bicycles and earn at least 150,000₫ to receive their next clue.
- At Bằng Chicken Farm, teams had to gather 20 live chickens and then deliver them using a đòn gánh to a vendor in the land market to receive their next clue and a duck, which they would have to bring with them to the Pit Stop.
- At Nha Tian Theatre, teams had to watch a fan dance and unscramble Hebrew letters on the performers' fans (נכנס יין יצא סוד – "Wine enters, secret goes out.") to receive their next clue.

=== Leg 4 (Vietnam) ===
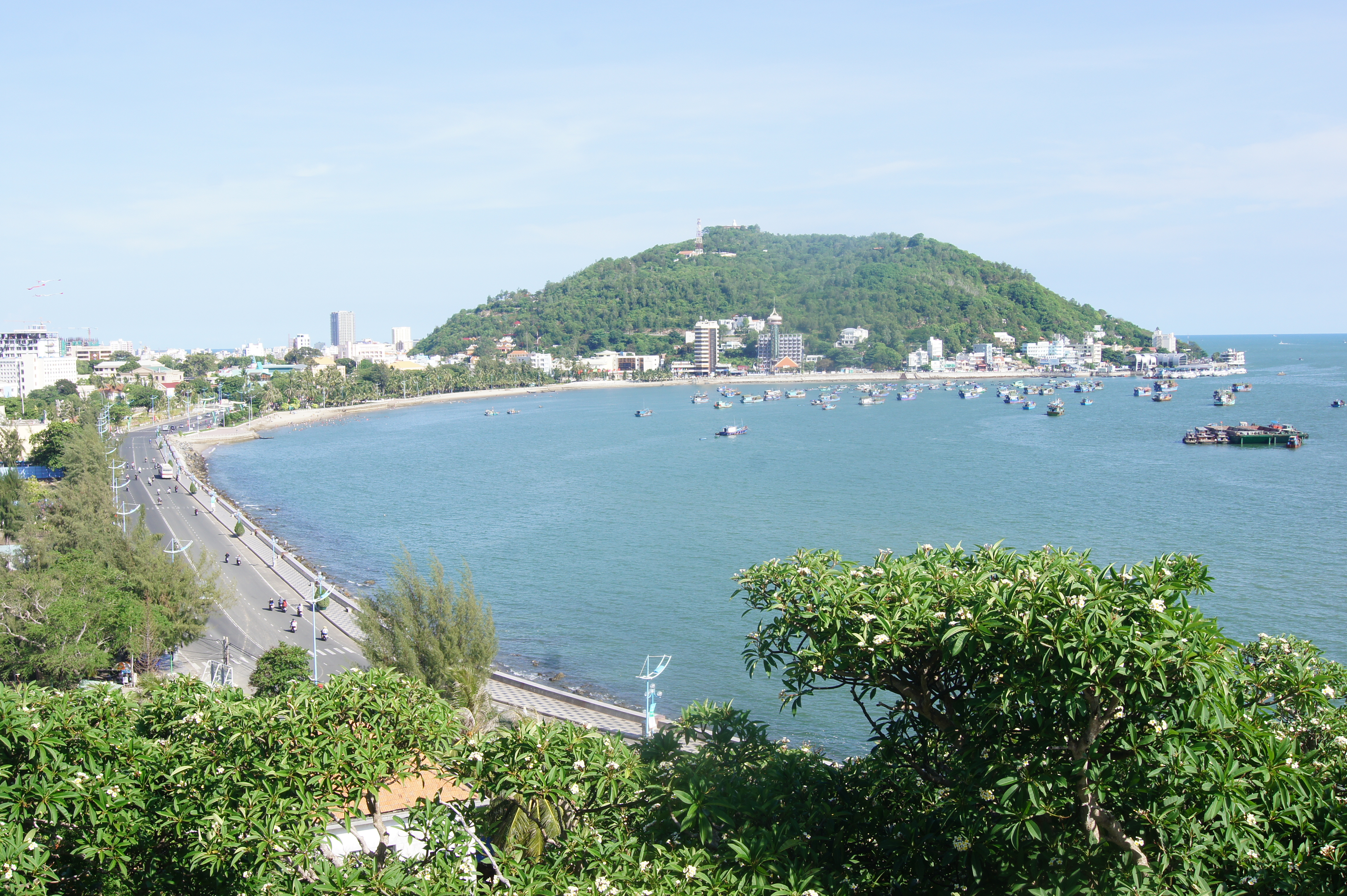
The coastal city of Vũng Tàu was the locale for this leg.

Airdates: 12 & 14 March 2009

- Ho Chi Minh City (Nguyễn Thông Motorcycle Shop)
- Ho Chi Minh City (Mien Dong Coach Station) to Bà Rịa
- Bà Rịa (Ruộng Lúa Hợp Tác Xã Quyết Thăng)
- Vũng Tàu (Vũng Tàu Market)
- Vũng Tàu (Ao Sen Cô Phương)
- Vũng Tàu (Vũng Tàu Promenade Park)
- Vũng Tàu (Trần Hưng Đạo Temple)
- Vũng Tàu (Hạ Long Street Promenade to Villa Blanche (in Vietnamese))

In this leg's Roadblock, one team member had to choose a water buffalo and then lead it to plough a muddy rice paddy in a slalom pattern past a series of posts before returning to the start to receive their next clue. Team members were taught beforehand some common vocal commands to help control their carabao but had to start over if they asked for help.

This leg's Detour was a choice between סירה במים (Syrah Bemeym – Water Boats) or לדווש ברגליים (Ledvesh Bergeleym – Pedal Feet). In Water Boats, teams had to paddle basket boats across the river to retrieve a dangling clue. In Pedal Feet, teams had to pedal bikes laden with shrimp baskets 2.5 kilometres (1.6 mi) to a house where they would receive their next clue.

Additional tasks

- At the Nguyen Thong Motorcycle Shop, teams had to assemble a motorcycle using an assembled motorcycle for reference to receive their next clue.
- At Vũng Tàu Market, teams had to correctly count the number of sardines in a basket to receive their next clue.
- At Vũng Tàu Promenade Park, teams had to correctly perform a traditional dance known as múa sạp, which involves jumping over bamboo sticks in time, to receive their next clue.
- At Tran Hung Dao Temple, teams had to solve a large Tower of Hanoi puzzle to receive their next clue.
- At Ha Long Street Promenade, one team member had to transport their partner to the next Pit Stop on a cyclo.

=== Leg 5 (Vietnam → Japan) ===
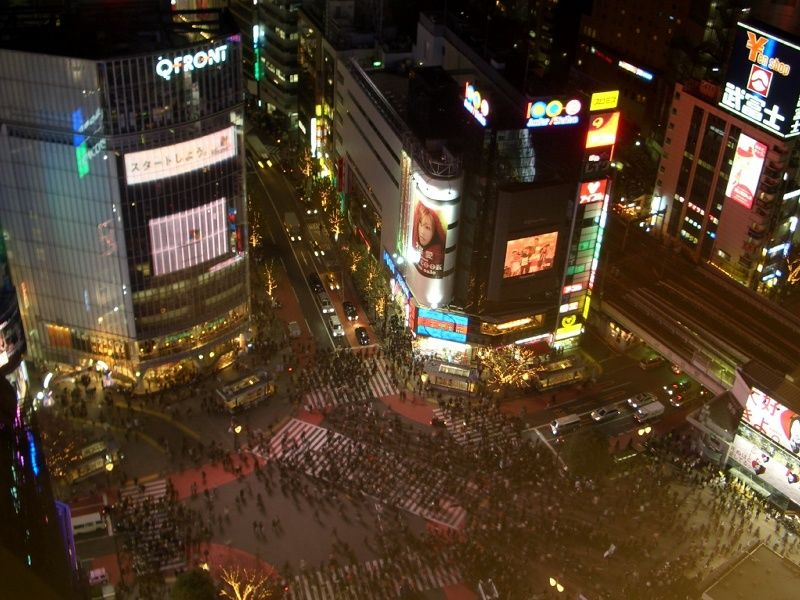
Upon arrival in Tokyo, teams had to make their way to the Shibuya Scramble Crossing and find their next clue on one of the screens.

Airdates: 19 & 26 March 2009

- Ho Chi Minh City (Tan Son Nhat International Airport) to Tokyo, Japan (Narita International Airport)
- Narita (Narita Airport Terminal 2·3 Station) to Tokyo (Shibuya – Shibuya Station)
- Tokyo (Shibuya – Shibuya Scramble Crossing)
- Tokyo (Shibuya – J-Pop Cafe)
- Tokyo (Shibuya – Geinu Kodansha School)
- Tokyo (Shinjuku – Shinjuku Station) to Gotemba (Gotemba Station)
- Gotemba (Forest)
- Gotemba (Mother Village)
- Yamanakako (Lake Yamanaka – The Big Swan)

This leg's Detour was a choice between ללמד (Lelmed – Teach) or ללמוד (Lelmod – Learn). In Teach, teams had to teach a schoolchild who did not speak Hebrew to memorize ten Hebrew words. If the child could pass a test from a local teacher, teams would receive their next clue. In Learn, teams had to learn ten Japanese words from a local schoolchild and pass a test from a local teacher to receive their next clue.

In this leg's Roadblock, one team member had to pass through three rows of archways, going through the correct archway in each row, to receive their next clue. If they entered an incorrect archway, they were sent back to the beginning by ninjas. If team members passed through 3 wrong archways, they would be sent to the back of the line of racers waiting to complete the task.

Additional tasks

- At the Shibuya Scramble Crossing, teams had to find their next clue on one of the large screens, which would instruct them to find a geisha wearing a pink kimono who would give them their next clue.
- At the J-Pop Cafe, teams had to search among women with Harajuku style clothing for one with a specific kanji character on her clothing to receive their next clue.
- At Mother Village, teams had to endure a seven-minute pedicure treatment given by baby piranhas and then solve a puzzle box encompassing their next clue.
- At Lake Yamanaka, teams had to pedal a swan boat to the Pit Stop, The Big Swan.

=== Leg 6 (Japan → Macau) ===
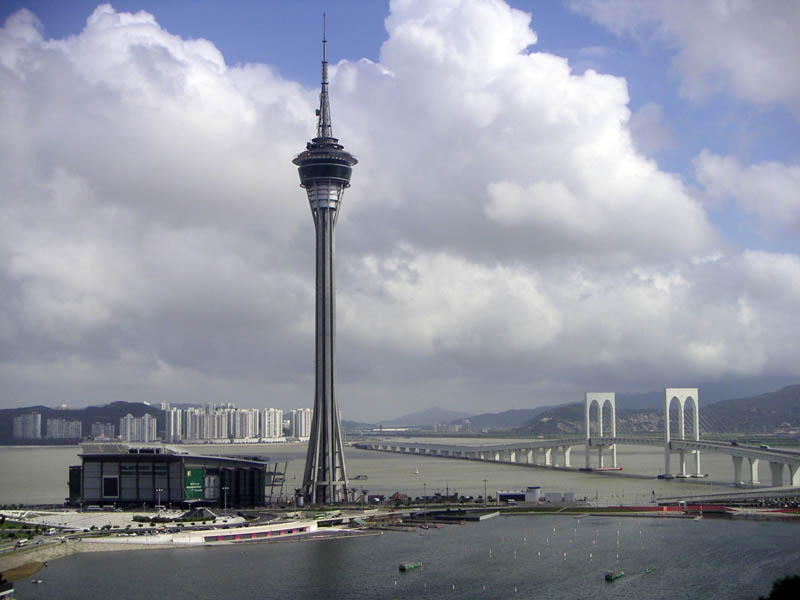
In Macau, one team member had to fall 233 meters from atop the Macau Tower.

Airdates: 2 & 4 April 2009

- Tokyo (Narita International Airport) to Freguesia de Nossa Senhora do Carmo, Macau, China (Macau International Airport)
- Freguesia da Sé (Senado Square)
- Freguesia da Sé (Kun Iam Statue)
- Freguesia da Sé (Sai Van Lake) (Overnight Rest)
- Freguesia da Sé (Macau Tower)
- Freguesia de Nossa Senhora de Fátima (Edificio Fabril Veng Kin) or Freguesia de Nossa Senhora do Carmo (Rua do Cunha)
- Freguesia de Santo António (Fortaleza do Monte)
- Zona do Aterro de Cotai (The Venetian Macao)

In this leg's Roadblock, one team member had to walk around the outer rim of the Macau Tower observation deck and then perform the SkyJump by falling 233 metres (764 ft) in a controlled descent from the 61st floor of the Macau Tower to receive their next clue.

This leg's Detour was a choice between אטריות (Ateriot – Noodles) or עוגיות (Eogiot – Cookies). In Noodles, teams had to use traditional methods to flatten and cut dough into three acceptable bundles of Chinese noodles to receive their next clue. In Cookies, teams had to bite into 2,000 almond cookies until they found one cookie with meat in it to receive their next clue.

Additional tasks

- At Senado Square, teams had to take a dragon head sculpture, travel to Kun Iam Statue to find a dragon tail sculpture, then take both sculptures to Sai Van Lake to find their next clue.
- At Sai Van Lake, teams had to put their dragon sculptures on a dragon boat and complete a lap of the lake in the boat to receive their next clue.
- After the Roadblock, teams had to find a Mini Moke parked nearby with their next clue.
- At Fortaleza do Monte, teams were given a key and had to find which of the 1000 locks it opened to receive their next clue.
- At The Venetian Macao, teams had to ride a gondola to the Pit Stop.

=== Leg 7 (Macau → Hong Kong) ===
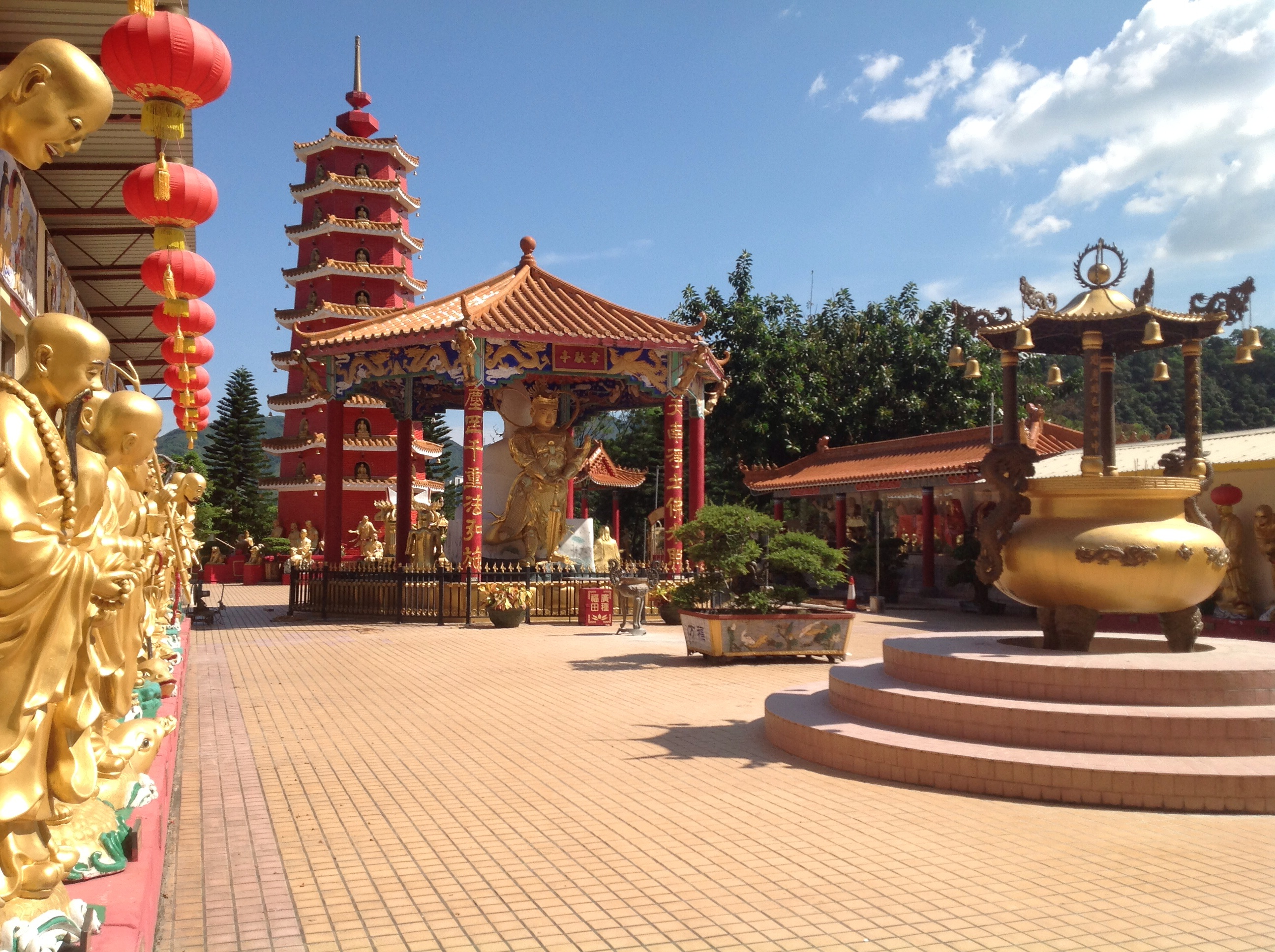
Teams finished the leg at Ten Thousand Buddhas Monastery in the Sha Tin area of Hong Kong.

Airdates: 16 & 23 April 2009

- Freguesia da Sé (Outer Harbour Ferry Terminal) to Central and Western District, Hong Kong (Hong Kong–Macau Ferry Terminal)
- Wan Chai District (Yee Wo Street)
- Wan Chai District (Cosmo Hotel)
- Wan Chai District (Southorn Stadium)
  - Sham Shui Po District (Lai Chi Kok Park)
- Central and Western District (Ko Shing Market)
- Kowloon City District (Kowloon Walled City Park)
- Kowloon City District (Commander Rock)
- Wong Tai Sin District (Wong Tai Sin Temple)
- Sha Tin District (Ten Thousand Buddhas Monastery)

In this leg's Roadblock, one team member had to play ping-pong against a junior champion and score seven points to receive their next clue.

For this season's second Fast Forward, one team had to travel to Lai Chi Kok Park, where they would discover that they had to perform a Buddhist tradition of completely shaving their heads to win the Fast Forward award.

This leg's Detour was a choice between קונג פו (Kung Fu) or ריקוד האריה (Reyqod HaReyah – Lion Dance). In Kung Fu, teams had to learn a series of kung fu stances and perform them for the kung fu master. Then, both team members had to break a stack of seven clay tiles with one punch to receive their next clue. In Lion Dance, teams had to learn a lion dance, find a local master, and correctly perform the dance while in a lion costume to receive their next clue.

Additional tasks

- On Yee Wo Street, teams had to find the answers to five questions: The number of squares on the logo of PCCW (12). The number of triangles on the logo of Sogo (2). The price of the South China Morning Post (7). The number of arches on the bridge (17). The missing number in the elevator of Cosmo Hotel (4).
- In the Cosmo Hotel, teams had to go to a marked room and use the numbers from the previous task in a calculation to find the number that opens a safe (1748) containing their next clue and a Harel Relax credit card, which they had to bring to the Pit Stop.
- At Ko Shing Market, teams had to find ingredients for a snake soup, bring them to a pharmacist, and consume two bowls of soup to receive their next clue.
- At Wong Tai Sin Temple, teams had to hear their future from one of three types of fortune tellers (phrenology, face reading, or kau chim) to receive their next clue.
- At the Ten Thousand Buddhas Monastery, teams had to correctly count the number of Buddha sculptures with only one hand visible (54) to check into the Pit Stop.

=== Leg 8 (Hong Kong → Australia) ===
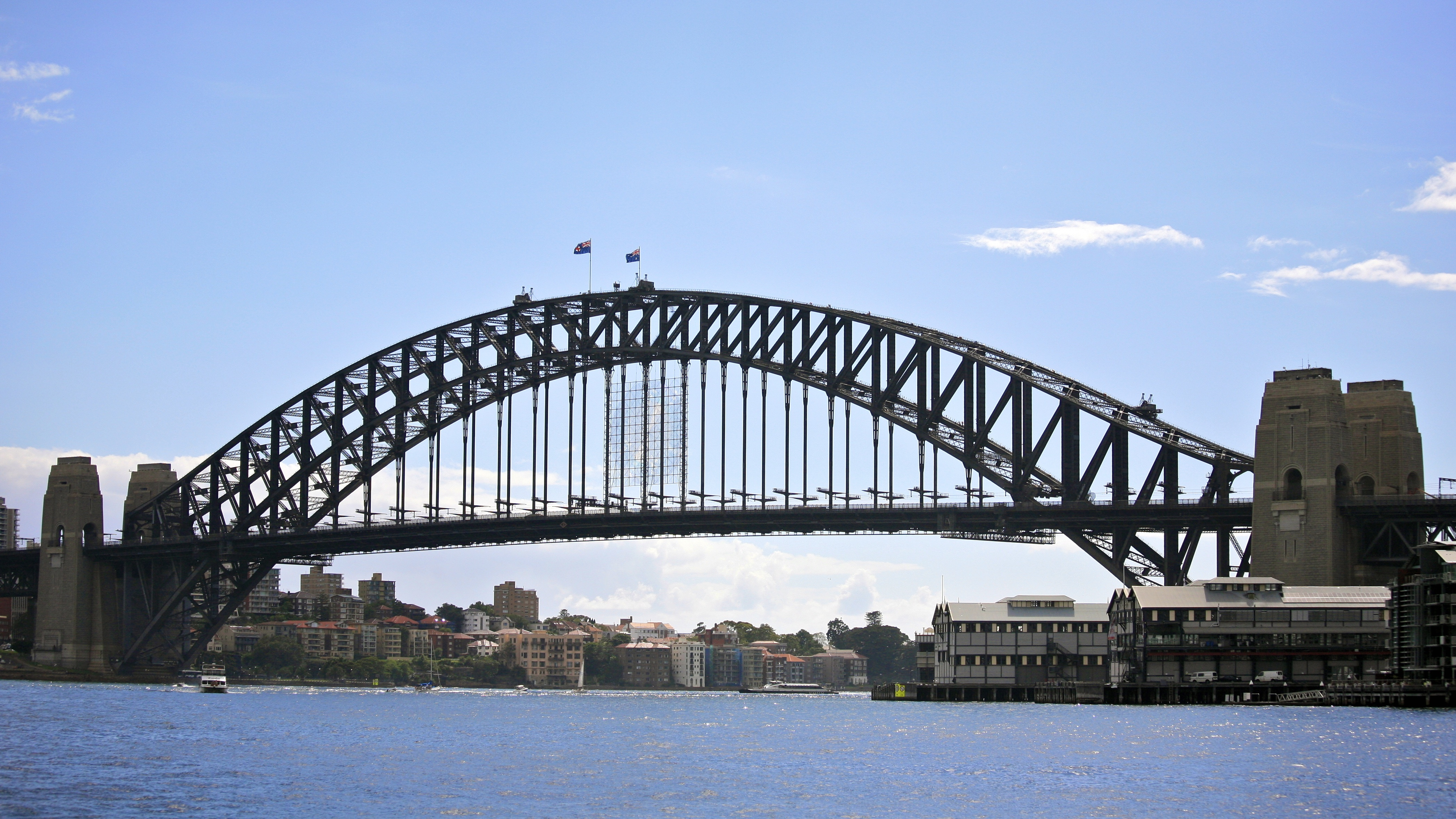
While in Sydney, teams visited the Sydney Harbour Bridge where they had to climb the top of the bridge.

Airdates: 30 April, 7 & 14 May 2009

- Chek Lap Kok (Hong Kong International Airport) to Sydney, New South Wales, Australia (Sydney Airport)
- Sydney (Dawes Point)
- Sydney (Woolloomooloo – Harry's Cafe de Wheels) (Overnight Rest)
- Sydney (Sydney Harbour Bridge)
- Sydney (Sydney Olympic Park – Acer Arena)
- Sydney (Sydney Olympic Park – Sydney Olympic Park Aquatic Centre or Sydney Circus Arts School)
- Sydney (Sydney Olympic Park – The Sprinter Sculpture)
- Sydney (City Centre – Circular Quay Ferry Wharf to Manly – Manly Wharf)
- Sydney (Manly – Manly Beach)
- Sydney (Hilton Hotel)
- Sydney (The Rocks – Australian Heritage Hotel)
- Sydney (The Rocks – Argyle Pub)
- Sydney (The Rocks – Orient Hotel)
- Sydney (Royal Botanical Gardens)

This leg's Detour was a choice between ריקוד במים (Reyqod Bemeym – Water Dance) or גלגול בשמיים (Gelgol Beshemeym – Sky Roll). For both Detour options, teams had to don leotards and travel by Segway to their chosen task. In Water Dance, teams had learn and perform a synchronized swimming routine to receive their next clue. In Sky Roll, both team members had to perform a flying trapeze maneuver known as a "catch" to receive their next clue.

In this leg's Roadblock, one team member had to perform a face-first rappel from the roof of the Hilton hotel to receive their next clue.

Additional tasks

- At Dawes Point, teams had to use binoculars to find the name of their next destination marked with two Amazing Race flags.
- At Harry's Cafe de Wheels, teams had to eat six meat pies, each of which had 1,000 calories, to receive their next clue and a departure time for the next morning.
- At Sydney Harbour Bridge, teams had to learn the "Aussie Aussie Aussie, Oi Oi Oi" cheer, don provided New Balance shoes, climb over the top of the bridge, and reiterate the cheer to receive their next clue.
- At Manly Beach, teams had to find a "Sheila" in an "Aussie cossie", a woman wearing a swimsuit with a design of the Australian flag on it, to receive their next clue.
- At Australian Heritage Hotel, both team members had to pour three cups of beer and carry them on a tray to the Argyle Pub. There, both team members had to pour three more cups of beer and deliver them to the bartender at the Orient Hotel without spilling the beer past a red line to receive their next clue.
- From the Orient Hotel, teams had to make their way by foot to the Pit Stop.

=== Leg 9 (Australia → New Zealand) ===
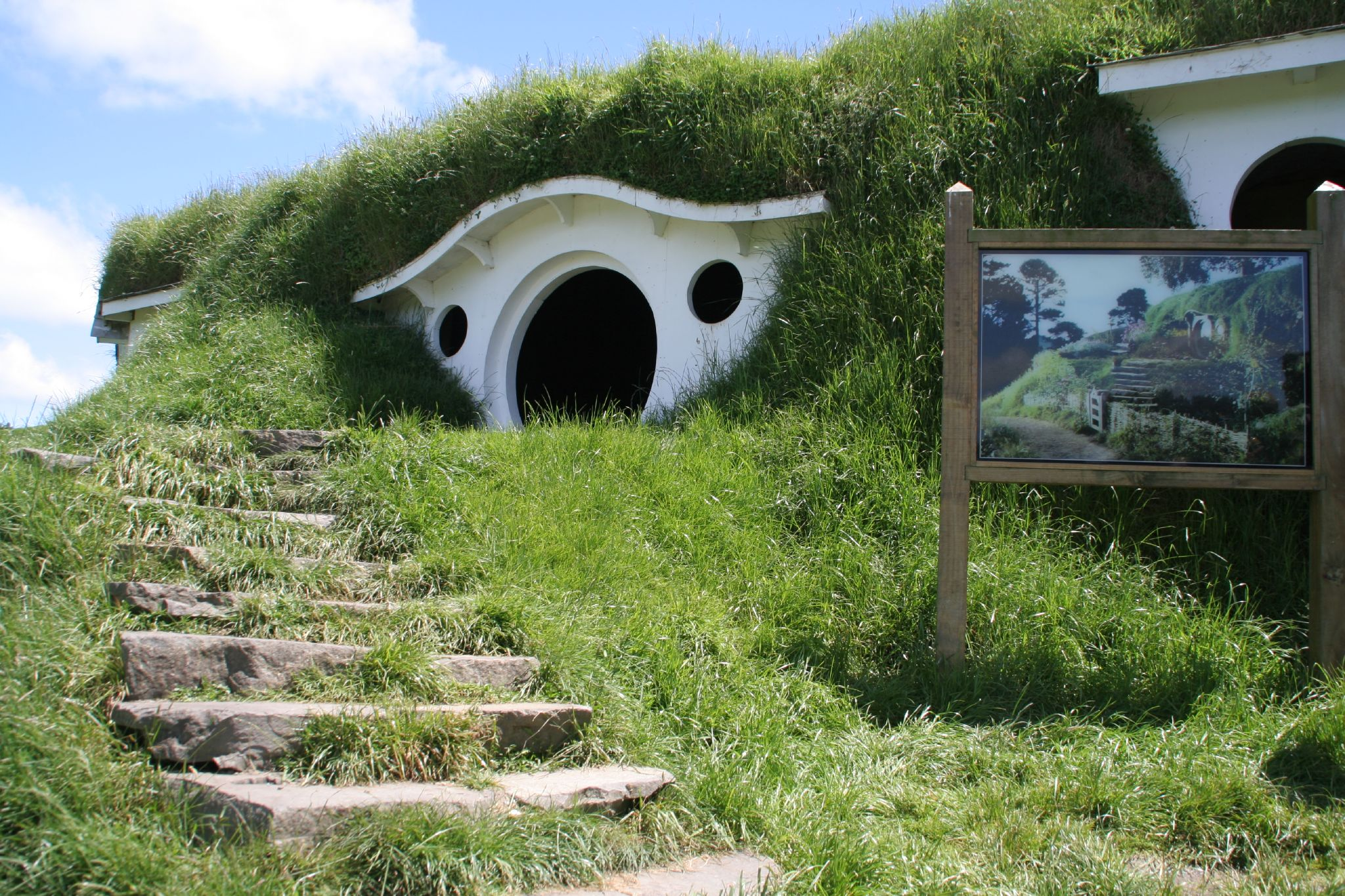
Teams visited the Hobbiton Movie Set near Matamata, New Zealand, one of the locations used for filming The Lord of the Rings movie trilogy.

Airdates: 14 & 21 May 2009

- Sydney (Issta Travel Agency)
- Sydney (Sydney Airport) to Auckland, New Zealand (Auckland Airport)
- Auckland (Westhaven Marina)
- Matamata (Hobbiton Movie Set) (Overnight Rest)
- Matamata (Shire's Rest Farm)
- Rotorua (Te Puia)
- Rotorua (Rotorua International Stadium or Pikirangi Village)
- Rotorua (Hell's Gate)
- Auckland (One Tree Hill)

In this leg's Roadblock, one team member had to herd three sheep into a small fenced area to receive their next clue.

This leg's Detour was a choice between לחטוף (Lechtof – Snatch) or לתפוס (Letfos – Catch). In Snatch, teams had to play Rugby against three professional Rugby players. They had to run with the ball 22 metres (72 ft) without coming into contact with the rugby players or letting the ball touch the ground. Then, one team member had to kick the ball through the goalposts to receive their next clue. In Catch, teams had to learn and correctly perform a Māori stick game known as titi torea to receive their next clue.

Additional tasks

- At the Issta travel agency, teams would receive tickets for one of two flights, each carrying two teams and arriving a half-hour apart.
- At Auckland Airport, teams had to find a Maui campervan, which would serve as their transportation for this leg, with their next clue.
- At Westhaven Marina, teams had to prepare a yacht for sailing so that it matched example yacht to study to receive their next clue from the skipper.
- At the Hobbiton Movie Set, teams had to find two items from The Lord of the Rings film trilogy (Gandalf's staff and the One Ring) and bring them to Gandalf to receive their next clue.
- At Te Puia, the male team members had to receive their next clue from a Māori warrior.
- In Hell's Gate, teams had to enter the mud pools and find two Māori totems, which they could exchange for their next clue.

=== Leg 10 (New Zealand) ===
Teams had to find a clue while riding in the Shotover Jet.

Airdates: 4 & 11 June 2009

- Auckland (Auckland Airport) to Queenstown (Queenstown Airport)
- Queenstown (Shotover River)
- Gibbston (Peren Farm)
- Queenstown (The Bakery)
- Queenstown (Lake Hayes)
- Queenstown (Deer Park Heights) (Overnight Rest)
- Queenstown (Queenstown Airport – Actionflite)
- Gibbston (Kawarau River)
- Gibbston (Dennis' Farm)
- Gibbston (Nevis Highwire Platform)
- Otago (Black Rock Valley)

In this season's final Roadblock, one team member had to ride in an airplane with a stunt pilot, enduring wild moves with heavy g-forces, to receive their next clue.

The task at the Nevis Highwire Platform was presented as an additional task, but it was actually a Detour. In the one aired choice, קפוץ יחד (Leqefotz 'Yeched – Jump Together), both team members would be harnesses together and had to swing above the Nevis Canyon to receive their next clue.

Additional tasks

- At Queenstown Airport, teams had to search for a marked Toyota Land Cruiser Prado with their next clue.
- At Shotover River, teams had to ride on an extreme jet boat and grab their next clue hanging along the way.
- At Peren Farm, teams had to search through 50 hay bales to find one of only five with their next clue.
- At The Bakery, teams had to decorate four Pavlovas and then sell them for a combined total of NZ$50 to receive their next clue.
- At Lake Hayes, teams had to cut five pieces of wood with a two-man saw together and two pieces from each team member. They then had to use them to correctly answer nine multiple-choice questions about the season to receive their next clue. The questions were:
  - Where did you experience the highest free fall in the world? (Macau)
  - What is the local nickname for the African delicacy of sheep head? (Smiley)
  - What was the name of the town where you met Gandalf? (Matamata)
  - What was the name of the traditional wooden weapon of the Khoisan tribe? (Intonga)
  - What was the name of the flower market where you sold flowers in Ho Chi Minh City? (Bến Thành Market)
  - What command will make a carabao turn left? (Hee)
  - What was the combination of the safe in Hong Kong? (1748)
  - What was the name of the meat pie from Harry's Cafe de Wheels? (Tiger Pie)
  - What is the nickname for the unique street fashion worn in the fashion district of Tokyo? (Harajuku).
- At Kawarau River, teams had to go riverboarding down the river to receive their next clue.
- At Dennis' Farm, one team member had to answer eight questions about the season's teams, and their partner had to match the answers to receive their next clue.

Questions	Answers		
Questions	Maya & Amichay	Shay & Guy	Tom & Gil
Who is the untrustworthy team?	Michal & Ran	Michal & Ran	Michal & Ran
Which team is overrated?	Hadas & Inbal	Hadas & Inbal	Maya & Amichay
Which team are you most jealous of?	Maor & Asher	Hannah & Margalit	Hadas & Inbal
Which of the three teams does not deserve to be in the finals?	Tom & Gil	Tom & Gil	Maya & Amichay
Which team should have reached the finals?	Michal & Ran	Michal & Ran	Michal & Ran
Which team has the best relationship with each other?	Maor & Asher	Shay & Guy	Tom & Gil
If the race was a foursome, which team would you pair up with?	Shay & Guy	Maya & Amichay	Shay & Guy
Which team argued the most?	Eliana & Yael	Alen & Inbal	Alen & Inbal

- In Black Rock Valley, teams had to roll a 250-kilogram (550 lb) globe using a set of three logs across a field before they could run to the Finish Line.

== Ratings ==
The first season had a 23% average Jewish household rating across the season.
