= Kfar HaOranim =

Israeli settlement in the West Bank

Kfar HaOranim: כְּפָר הָאֳרָנִים כפר האורנים (Hebrew)
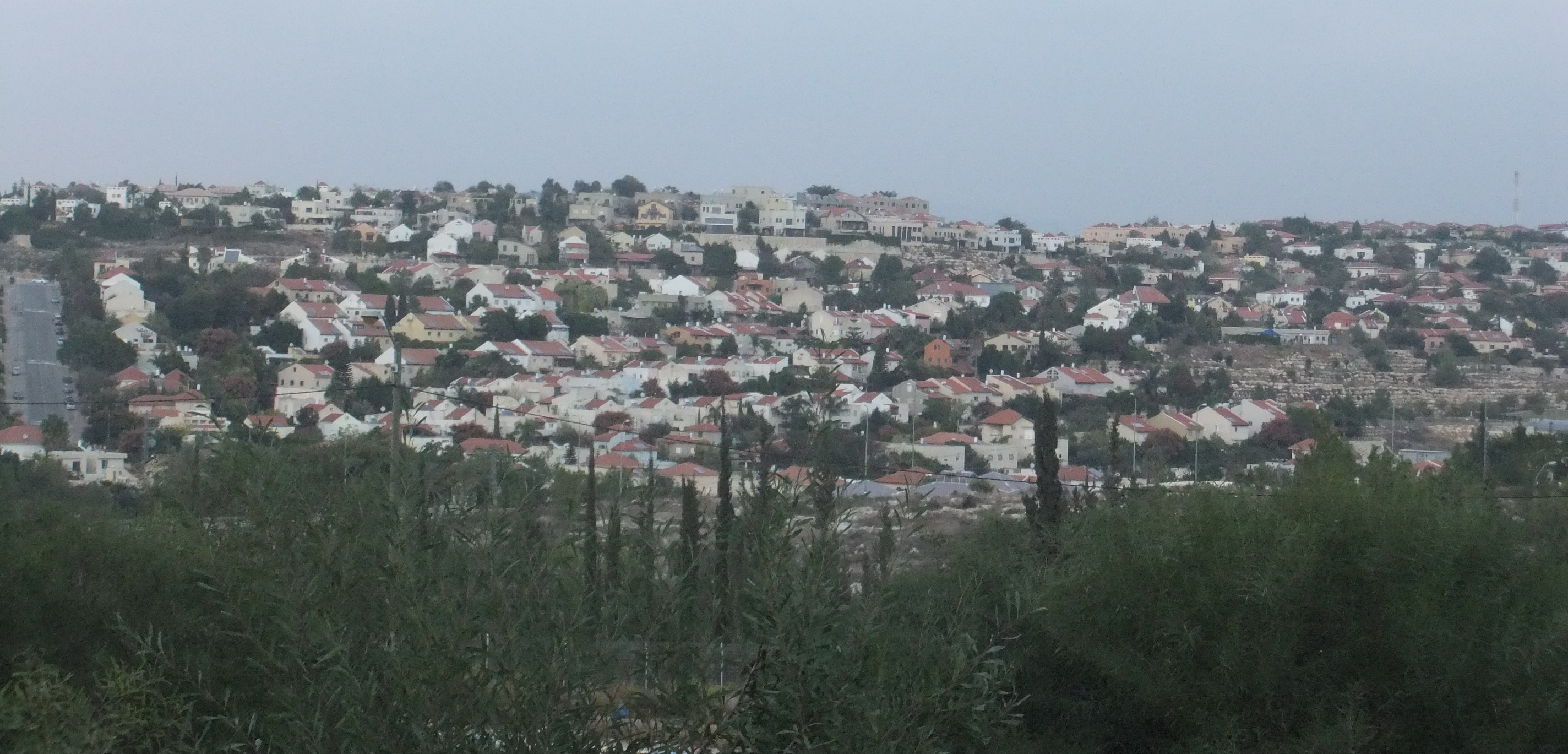
- Etymology: Village of the Pines
- Location within the Central West Bank Location within the West Bank
- Coordinates: 31°55′9″N 35°2′18″E
- Country: Palestine
- District: Judea and Samaria Area
- Council: Mateh Binyamin
- Region: West Bank
- Founded: 1997
- Founder: Amana
- Population (2024): 2,314

Kfar HaOranim (Hebrew: כְּפָר הָאֳרָנִים, lit. 'Village of the Pines'), also known as Menorah (Hebrew: מְנוֹרָה) or Giv'at Ehud, is an Israeli settlement in the West Bank. Contiguous with Lapid and located near to the major city of Modi'in, it is organised as a community settlement and falls under the jurisdiction of Mateh Binyamin Regional Council. In 2024 it had a population of 2,314.

The international community considers Israeli settlements in the West Bank illegal under international law, but the Israeli government disputes this.

== History ==
Planning for the settlement (then named Giv'at Ehud, after Ehud Ben-Amitai, a fighter pilot killed in a training accident) began in 1981. The cornerstone was laid in 1984 at a ceremony attended by Prime Minister Yitzhak Shamir, by which time the name Menorah was suggested. Ultimately, the name Kfar HaOranim was accepted. However, legal issues over the ownership of the land led to a delay in construction. The first residents moved in during October 1997.

According to ARIJ, Israel confiscated 682 dunams of land from the Palestinian village of Saffa for the construction of Menorah/Kfar HaOranim.

== Notable residents ==
- Moshe Edri, retired police officer, Director General of Knesset
