= Elena Ralph =

Israeli model and beauty queen (born 1983)

- ילנה ראלף
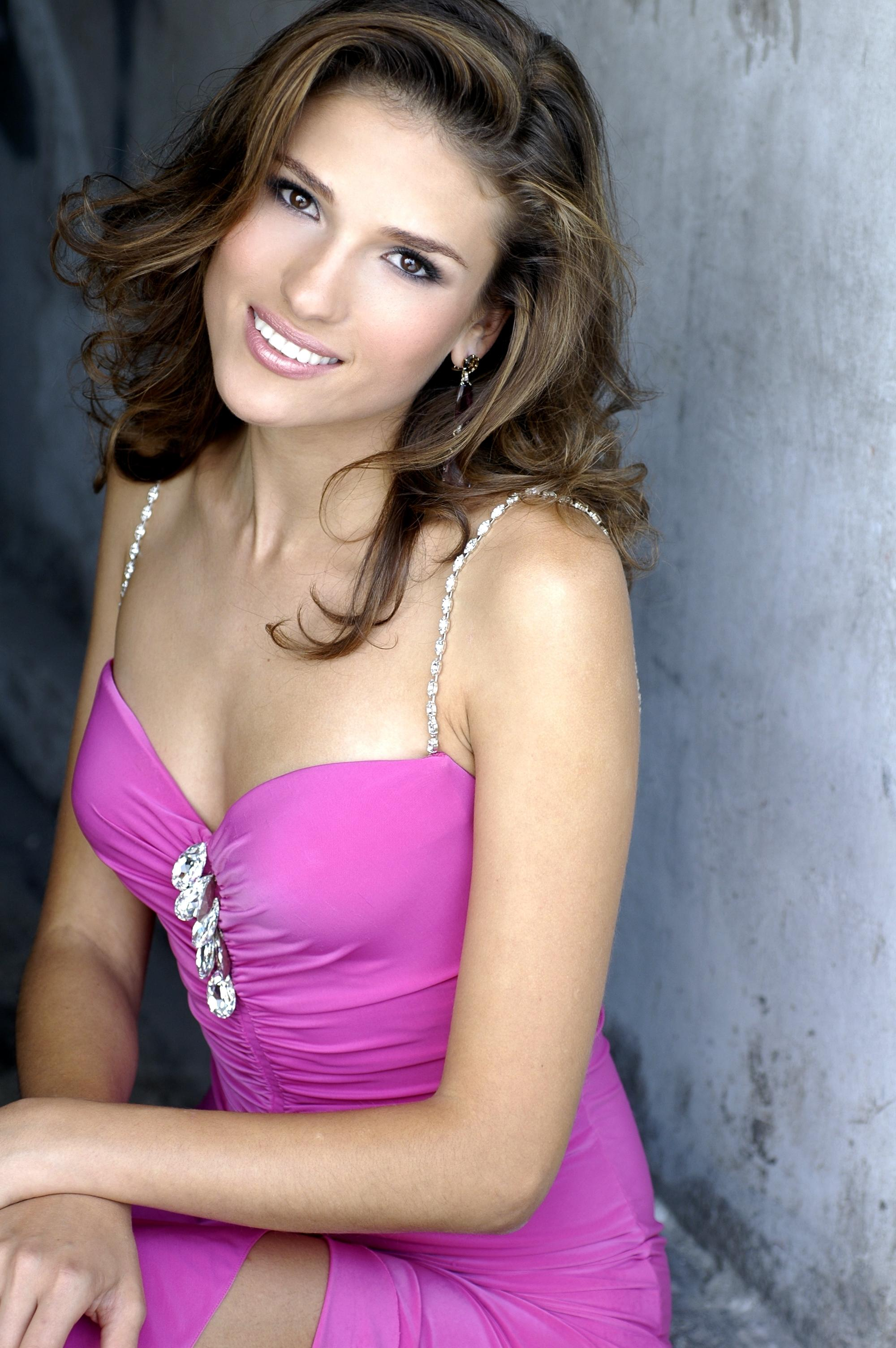
- Born: November 27, 1983 (age 42)
- Occupations: Actress; model

Elena Ralph (Hebrew: ילנה ראלף, Russian: Елена Ральф; born November 27, 1983) is an Israeli actress, model and beauty pageant titleholder who was crowned Miss Israel 2005 and represented her country at Miss Universe 2005 where placed Top 10.

Ralph was born in Donetsk, Soviet Ukraine, to a family of engineers, a Christian father and a Jewish mother.

Ralph won the Miss Israel 2005 title and went on to represent Israel in the Miss Universe 2005 beauty pageant held in Bangkok, Thailand. She made the top ten in the internationally televised pageant, which was Israel's first placement since 2001. (The pageant was won by Natalie Glebova of Canada.)

Ralph came to Israel in 2001 by herself at the age of 18, under the Jewish Agency's Students before Parents educational program. After the graduation from the program Elena Ralph studied sociology at the Tel Aviv University, and management and political science at the Open University of Israel.

In 2009, she was a contestant in the first season of reality show HaMerotz LaMillion, she and fellow Miss Israel Liran Kohener placed 10th.
