= Kfar Truman =

Moshav in central Israel

Kfar Truman: כְּפַר טְרוּמַן (Hebrew)
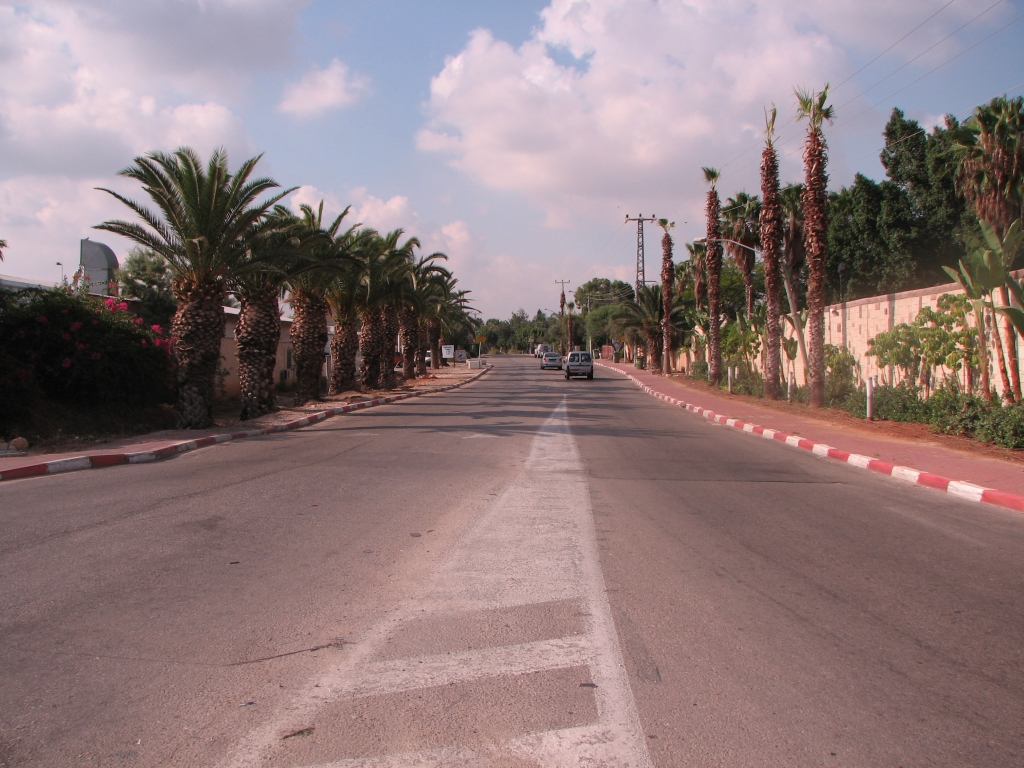

- Location within Central Israel
- Coordinates: 31°58′47″N 34°55′20″E
- Country: Israel
- District: Central
- Subdistrict: Ramla
- Council: Hevel Modi'in
- Affiliation: Moshavim Movement
- Founded: 1949
- Founder: Demobilized Harelniks
- Population (2024): 850

Kfar Truman (Hebrew: כְּפַר טְרוּמַן, lit. 'Truman Village') is a moshav in central Israel. Located in the Shephelah around three kilometres east of Ben Gurion International Airport, it falls under the jurisdiction of Hevel Modi'in Regional Council. In 2024 it had a population of 850.

== History ==
According to Marom, during the 18th and 19th centuries, the area around Kfar Truman belonged to the Nahiyeh (sub-district) of Lod that encompassed the area of the present-day city of Modi'in-Maccabim-Re'ut in the south to the present-day city of El'ad in the north, and from the foothills in the east, through the Lod Valley to the outskirts of Jaffa in the west. This area was home to thousands of inhabitants in about 20 villages, who had at their disposal tens of thousands of hectares of prime agricultural land.

The moshav was established in 1949 by demobilised Palmach soldiers of the Harel Brigade on land located near the depopulated Palestinian village of Bayt Nabala. It was initially called Bnei Harel (Sons of Harel), but in 1950, representatives of the Jewish Agency proposed changing the name to Kfar Truman, in honor of U.S. president Harry S. Truman, who had supported the establishment of the State of Israel. In return, the moshav was promised official recognition, entitling it to services such as roads, running water and electricity. The forest alongside Kfar Truman was renamed for Margaret Truman, daughter of the president.

== See also ==
- Trump Heights
