= Liran Kohener =

Israeli beauty queen (born 1988)

Liran Kohener לירן כוהנר
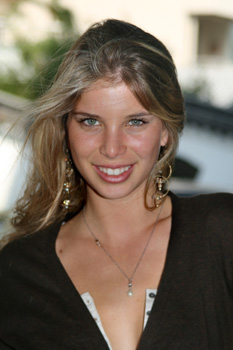
- Kohner representing Israel at the Miss World 2007
- Born: Liran Chaya Kohener; November 20, 1988 (age 37); Rishon LeZion, Israel
- Height: 1.71 m (5 ft 7 in)
- Spouse: Guy Geyor (m. 2015)
- Children: 2
- Beauty pageant titleholder
- Title: Miss Israel 2007

Liran Chaya Kohener-Geyor (Hebrew: לירן כוהנר-גיאור; born November 20, 1988) is an Israeli model and beauty pageant titleholder who won Miss Israel 2007 and represented Israel at Miss World 2007.

== Biography ==
Kohener was born in Rishon LeZion, Israel, to Israeli-born parents. Her father is of Turkish Jewish descent, whereas her mother is of Moroccan Jewish and Egyptian Jewish descent. To celebrate her Bat Mitzvah, Kohener travelled with family all across Europe. After graduating high school, she served as a soldier in the Israeli Air Force.

In 2009, Kohener competed with fellow Miss Israel Elena Ralph in the first season of the reality show HaMerotz LaMillion (the Israeli version of The Amazing Race). She married Israeli naturopath and television persona Guy Geyor in 2015. They have two daughters.

== See also ==
- Israeli women
