= HaMerotz LaMillion 9 =

Season of television series

- Season 9
- Presented by: Yehuda Levi
- No. of days: 35
- No. of teams: 13
- Winners: Lee & Anne Avrahami
- Distance traveled: 59,566 km (37,013 mi)
- No. of episodes: 39

Release
- Original network: Channel 12
- Original release: 1 July – 25 September 2024

Additional information
- Filming dates: 11 May – 14 June 2023

Series chronology
- ← Previous; Season 8 (on Channel 13) Next → Season 10

HaMerotz LaMillion 9, also known as HaMerotz LaMillion 2024, is the ninth season of HaMerotz LaMillion (Hebrew: המירוץ למיליון, lit. The Race to the Million), an Israeli reality competition show based on the American series The Amazing Race, and the first installment of Channel 12's iteration of the show. Hosted by Yehuda Levi, replacing Ron Shahar who hosted the previous seasons of the show, it featured thirteen teams of two, each with a pre-existing relationship, in a race around the world to win ₪1,000,000. This season visited four continents and twelve countries and traveled over 59,566 kilometres (37,013 mi) during twelve legs. Starting in Mýrdalshreppur, racers traveled through Iceland, Spain, Gibraltar, Morocco, Senegal, Azerbaijan, Austria, Germany, Mongolia, South Korea, Vietnam, and New Zealand before finishing in Gibbston. New twists introduced in this season include Partner Swap. Elements of the show that returned for this season include the Fast Forward and the no-rest leg. The season was set to premiere in early 2024, although the premiere date was delayed by the Gaza war. The season premiered on 1 July 2024 on Channel 12 and concluded on 25 September 2024.

Sisters Lee and Anne Avrahami were the winners of this season, while niece and uncle Inbar Ben Atia and Avishai Regev finished in second place, and married parents Lior Dabach and Sapir Avisror finished in third place.

== Production ==
=== Development and filming ===
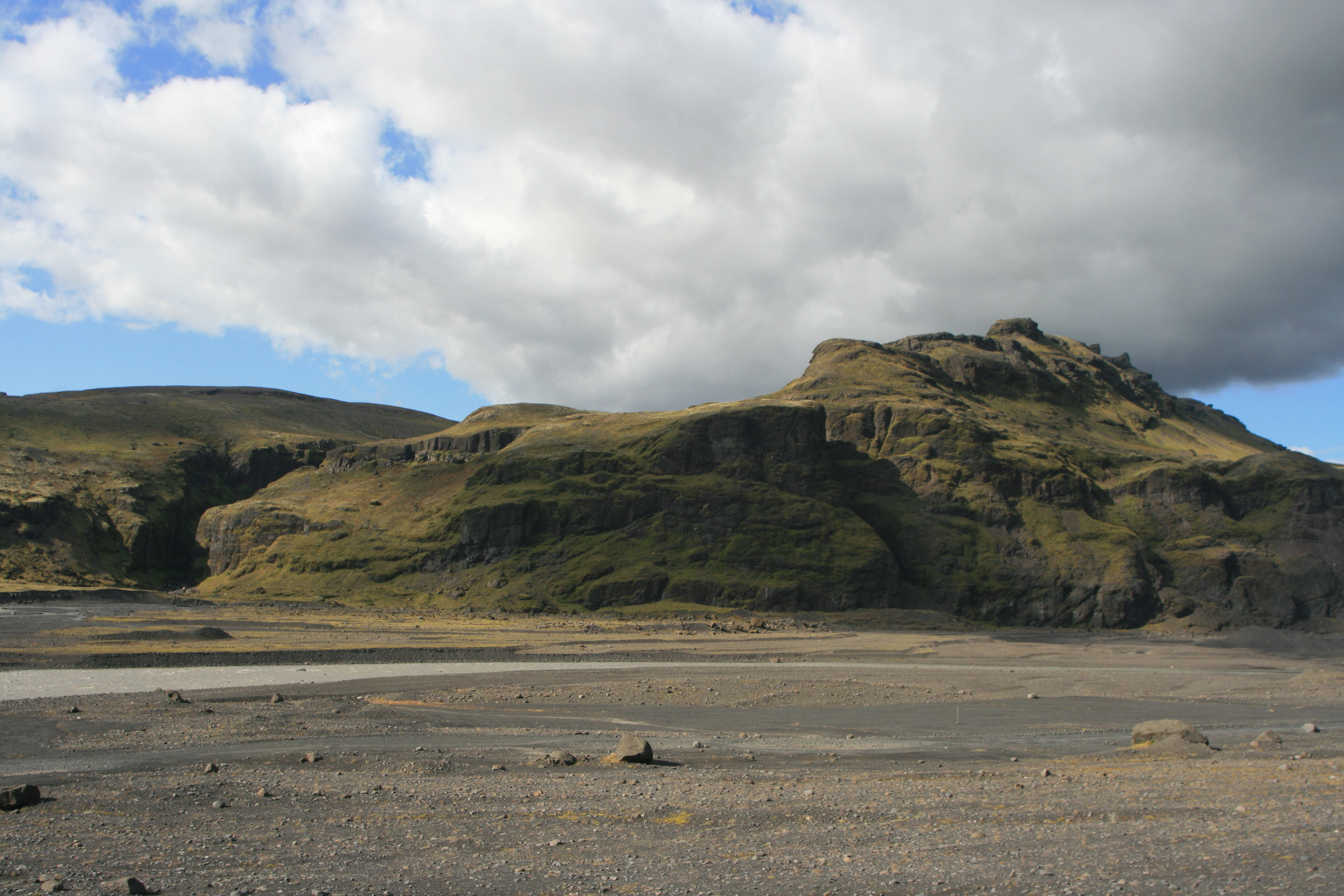
HaMerotz LaMillion 9 began within the volcanos, glaciers, and black sands of the Southern Region of Iceland.

During finale press for the previous season, Ron Shahar said that due to the COVID-19 pandemic production for a subsequent season would happen after the countries to which the show would visit had sufficient vaccinated populations. Shahar reiterated that filming for a new season would happen as soon as possible in an interview after his elimination from The Singer in the Mask a year later. In October 2022, Channel 13 announced that it would be producing a local version of Peking Express instead of new seasons of HaMerotz LaMillion due to high production costs, with Peking Express estimated to cost 1.1 million shekels per episode rather than 1.5 million shekels for each episode of HaMerotz LaMillion.

On 11 November 2022, Channel 12 announced that it had acquired the rights to HaMerotz LaMillion and would be filming a new season in 2023. On 12 March 2023, Yehuda Levi was announced as the new host of HaMerotz LaMillion. Filming began in May 2023 (The Amazing Race 35 was filmed shortly after the conclusion of this season but aired before that). On 14 May 2023, racers were spotted in Málaga, Spain, by Hapoel Jerusalem B.C. fans there for the 2023 Basketball Champions League Final Four. On 9 June, filming occurred in Queenstown, New Zealand. After 35 days, filming concluded in mid-June. Promotion material released before the season began claimed that this season visited more countries that any other season of The Amazing Race globally. This season also includes first-time visits to Iceland, the British Overseas Territory of Gibraltar, the Arab world with Morocco, Senegal, Azerbaijan, Austria, Germany, and Mongolia.

=== Casting ===
Casting for the season opened on 24 November 2022. Within a month, over 6,000 people had applied for the show. The cast was finalized in April 2023.

== Release ==
=== Broadcast ===
The season was slated to release in early 2024; however, news coverage of the Gaza war delayed the programming blocks for Channel 12. On 26 June 2024, the premiere date was announced to be 1 July.

=== Marketing ===
Sponsors for this season include Harel Group, Samsung, SKYMAX, Loacker, La Roche-Posay, Papaya Gaming, XL Energy Drink, and Elite Turkish Coffee.

== Cast ==
The cast includes Bnot Brak cast member Esti Socolovski, Tnuva vice chairman Guy Rosen, and Yiftach Ramon, son of Space Shuttle Columbia disaster victim Ilan Ramon. The cast was revealed on 1 July 2024.

Contestants	Age	Relationship	Hometown	Status
Michal Matzov (מיכל מצוב)	29	Internet Stars	Haifa	Eliminated 1st (in Reykjavík, Iceland)
Elrom Ben Avraham (אלרום בן אברהם)	25	Internet Stars	Petah Tikva	Eliminated 1st (in Reykjavík, Iceland)
Shahar Elbaz (שחר אלבז)	27	Mother/Son	Petah Tikva	Eliminated 2nd (in Tangier, Morocco)
Ronit Elbaz (רונית אלבז)	56	Mother/Son	Petah Tikva	Eliminated 2nd (in Tangier, Morocco)
Racheli Mizrahi (רחלי מזרחי)	39	Sisters	Jerusalem	Eliminated 3rd (in Marrakesh, Morocco)
Miri Eliezer (מירי אליעזר)	42	Sisters	Jerusalem	Eliminated 3rd (in Marrakesh, Morocco)
Amit Chen (עמית חן)	30	Best Friends	Tel Aviv	Eliminated 4th (in Dakar, Senegal)
Rotem Revivo (רותם רביבו)	29	Best Friends	Tel Aviv	Eliminated 4th (in Dakar, Senegal)
Idan Rosen (עידן רוזן)	26	Father/Son	Petah Tikva	Eliminated 5th (in Baku, Azerbaijan)
Guy Rosen (גיא רוזן)	58	Father/Son	Petah Tikva	Eliminated 5th (in Baku, Azerbaijan)
Hasida "Hasi" Chasson (חסי חסון)	52	Mother/Daughter	Rishon LeZion	Eliminated 6th (in Munich, Germany)
Yarin Chasson (ירין חסון)	24	Mother/Daughter	Rishon LeZion	Eliminated 6th (in Munich, Germany)
Mahmoud "Modi" Safouri (מודי ספורי)	46	Business Partners	Bat Yam	Withdrew (in Ulaanbaatar, Mongolia)
Miki Laloum (מיקי ללום)	43	Business Partners	Bat Yam	Withdrew (in Ulaanbaatar, Mongolia)
Udi Naor (אודי נאור)	28	Childhood Friends	Ramat HaSharon	Eliminated 7th (in Seoul, South Korea)
Matan Oved (מתן עובד)	28	Childhood Friends	Ramat HaSharon	Eliminated 7th (in Seoul, South Korea)
Sahar Koren (סהר קורן)	29	Army Friends	Kfar HaNassi	Eliminated 8th (in Ho Chi Minh City, Vietnam)
Yiftach Ramon (יפתח רמון)	31	Army Friends	Ramat Gan	Eliminated 8th (in Ho Chi Minh City, Vietnam)
Itzik Socolovski (איציק סוקולובסקי)	33	Married Parents	Bnei Brak	Eliminated 9th (in Queenstown, New Zealand)
Esti Socolovski (אסתי סוקולובסקי)	31	Married Parents	Bnei Brak	Eliminated 9th (in Queenstown, New Zealand)
Lior Dabach (ליאור דבח)	30	Married Parents	Be'er Ya'akov	Third place
Sapir Avisror (ספיר אביסרור)	28	Married Parents	Be'er Ya'akov	Third place
Inbar Ben Atia (ענבר בן עטיה)	26	Uncle/Niece	Gedera	Runners-up
Avishai Regev (אבישי רגב)	44	Uncle/Niece	Talmei Yehiel	Runners-up
Lee Avrahami (לי אברהמי)	24	Sisters	Tel Aviv	Winners
Anne Avrahami (אן אברהמי)	23	Sisters	Tel Aviv	Winners

Future appearances

In 2025, Yiftach Ramon competed on the eleventh season of Rokdim Im Kokhavim.

== Results ==
The following teams are listed with their placements in each leg. Placements are listed in finishing order.

- A red placement with a dagger (†) indicates that the team was eliminated.
- An italicized and underlined placement indicates that the team was the last to arrive at a Pit Stop, but there was no rest period at the Pit Stop and all teams were instructed to continue racing.
- A green ƒ indicates that the team won the Fast Forward. If placed next to a leg number, this indicates that the Fast Forward was available for that leg but not obtained.
- An orange + indicates that there was a Duel on this leg, while an orange − indicates the team that lost the final iteration of the Duel and received a 15-minute penalty.
- A gold < or orange « indicates the team who received a Yield; > or » indicates that the team voted for the recipient.
- A brown ⊂ indicates the team who received a U-Turn; ⊃ indicates that the team voted for the recipient.

Team placement (by leg)
Team	1	2ƒ	3+	4+	5	6	7	8	9+	10+	11	12
Lee & Anne	7th⊃	1st	3rd	3rd	7th	4th⊃	1st⊃	2nd	1st	3rd<	1st	1st
Inbar & Avishai	8th⊃	9th	5th>	7th	4th	7th	3rd⊃	3rd	3rd	1st>	3rd	2nd
Lior & Sapir	9th	8th>	2nd>	2nd	2nd	6th⊂	5th⊃	6th⊂ (Note: Lior & Sapir were the last team to arrive at MBC Studios, which was then announced to be the Pit Stop as part of the Partner Swap twist.)	2nd	2nd>−	2nd	3rd (Note: Lior & Sapir decided to quit the task at Tussock Point due to Lior having an anxiety attack. Yehuda then came to the location and confirmed they had finished the race in third place.)
Itzik & Esti	2nd⊃	5th	7th>	5th	3rd>	2nd	2nd⊃	4th⊃	4th	4th>	4th†	
Sahar & Yiftach	1st	6th^{«}_{>}	1st	4th<	6th>	5th⊃	4th	5th⊃	5th	5th†		
Udi & Matan	3rd	11th»	8th>	6th	8th<	1st⊃	7th⊂ (Note: Udi & Matan arrived last at the Pit Stop but were spared from elimination due to Miki & Modi electing to quit the race.)	1st⊃	6th†			
Modi & Miki	5th⊃	4th»	4th>	8th>	5th	3rd	6th† (Note: After initially arriving 6th at the Pit Stop, Modi & Miki made the decision to quit the race as Miki was suffering from exhaustion during the past few legs.)					
Hasi & Yarin	11th	7th	10th>	9th	1st>	8th†						
Idan & Guy	12th⊃	2nd»	9th	1st>	9th†							
Amit & Rotem	4th⊃	3rd»	6th	10th†>−								
Racheli & Miri	10th⊃	10th<	11th†<−									
Shahar & Ronit	6th	12th†>										
Michal & Elrom	13th†⊂											

=== Voting history ===
Teams may vote to choose either U-Turn or Yield. The team with the most votes received the U-Turn or Yield penalty, depending on the respective leg.

	U-Turn	Yield				U-Turn			Yield
Leg #	1	2	3	4	5	6	7	8	10
U-Turned/Yielded	Michal & Elrom	Racheli & Miri; Sahar & Yiftach	Racheli & Miri	Sahar & Yiftach	Udi & Matan	Lior & Sapir	Udi & Matan	Lior & Sapir	Lee & Anne
Result	7–1–1–1–1–1–1	4–4–2–1–1	6–2–2–1	3–2–2–1–1–1	3–2–2–1–1	3–1–1–1–1–1	4–1–1–1	3–2–1	3–1–1
Voter	Team's Vote								
Lee & Anne	Michal & Elrom	Shahar & Ronit	Lior & Sapir	Lior & Sapir	Lior & Sapir	Lior & Sapir	Udi & Matan	Udi & Matan	Inbar & Avishai
Inbar & Avishai	Michal & Elrom	Racheli & Miri	Racheli & Miri	Hasi & Yarin	Hasi & Yarin	Hasi & Yarin	Udi & Matan	Lee & Anne	Lee & Anne
Lior & Sapir	Racheli & Miri	Racheli & Miri	Racheli & Miri	Lee & Anne	Lee & Anne	Lee & Anne	Udi & Matan	Udi & Matan	Lee & Anne
Itzik & Esti	Michal & Elrom	Shahar & Ronit	Racheli & Miri	Udi & Matan	Udi & Matan	Udi & Matan	Udi & Matan	Lior & Sapir	Lee & Anne
Sahar & Yiftach	Modi & Miki	Racheli & Miri	Udi & Matan	Udi & Matan	Udi & Matan	Lior & Sapir	Modi & Miki	Lior & Sapir	Lior & Sapir
Udi & Matan	Lior & Sapir	Sahar & Yiftach	Racheli & Miri	Hasi & Yarin	Hasi & Yarin	Lior & Sapir	Lior & Sapir	Lior & Sapir	
Modi & Miki	Michal & Elrom	Sahar & Yiftach	Racheli & Miri	Sahar & Yiftach	Sahar & Yiftach	Sahar & Yiftach	Sahar & Yiftach		
Hasi & Yarin	Udi & Matan	Udi & Matan	Racheli & Miri	Inbar & Avishai	Udi & Matan	Inbar & Avishai			
Idan & Guy	Michal & Elrom	Sahar & Yiftach	Udi & Matan	Sahar & Yiftach	Sahar & Yiftach				
Amit & Rotem	Michal & Elrom	Sahar & Yiftach	Sahar & Yiftach	Sahar & Yiftach					
Racheli & Miri	Michal & Elrom	Lior & Sapir	Lior & Sapir						
Shahar & Ronit	Inbar & Avishai	Racheli & Miri							
Michal & Elrom	Amit & Rotem								

== Episode Titles ==
Translated from Hebrew from the official website:

1. The Premiere Episode (תכנית הבכורה) (Leg 1)
2. The Start - The Second Part (ההזנקה - החלק השני) (Leg 1)
3. The First Elimination (ההדחה הראשונה) (Leg 1)
4. Arriving in Spain (מגיעים לספרד) (Leg 2)
5. The Battle of Gibraltar (הקרב על גיברלטר) (Leg 2)
6. A Storm in Morocco (סערה במרוקו) (Leg 2)
7. Elimination Episode! (פרק הדחה!) (Leg 2)
8. Crazy Day in the Desert (היום המטורף במדבר) (Leg 3)
9. Itzik in His Life's Mission (איציק במשימת חייו) (Leg 3)
10. The Dramatic Night in Marrakesh (הלילה הדרמטי במרקש) (Leg 3)
11. Not Easy at all in Senegal (לא קל בכלל בסנגל) (Leg 4)
12. The Sweet Revenge (הנקמה המתוקה) (Leg 4)
13. 48 Hours of Drama (48 שעות של דרמה) (Leg 4)
14. Heartbreaking Elimination (הדחה שוברת לב) (Leg 4)
15. The Race Has Reopened (המירוץ נפתח מחדש) (Leg 5)
16. The Fight That Became a Victory (הריב שהפך לניצחון) (Leg 5)
17. Upheavals in Azerbaijan (המהפכים באזרבייג'ן) (Leg 5)
18. A Strong Team is Eliminated! (זוג חזק מודח!) (Leg 5)
19. Landing in Austria (נוחתים באוסטריה) (Leg 6)
20. Love or Rejection? (אהבה או הדחה?) (Leg 6)
21. Last Minute Elimination (90-הדחה בדקה ה) (Leg 6)
22. The Race in Mongolia (המירוץ במונגוליה) (Leg 7)
23. Mongolian Dance (הריקוד המונגולי) (Leg 7)
24. The Rule-Breaking Elimination (ההדחה שוברת החוקים) (Leg 7)
25. Landing in Korea! (נוחתים בקוריאה!) (Leg 8)
26. The Task That Overwhelms Everyone (המשימה שהציפה הכול) (Leg 8)
27. The Teams Are Revealed (זוגות נחשפים) (Leg 8)
28. The First Challenge! (האתגר הראשון!) (Leg 9)
29. Team Litzik in Seoul (צוות ליציק בסיאול) (Leg 9)
30. Esti's Choice (בחירתה של אסתי) (Leg 9)
31. A Single Task and an Elimination (משימת יחיד והדחה) (Leg 9)
32. The Battle for the Semi-Finals (הקרב על חצי הגמר) (Leg 10)
33. The Storm in Vietnam (הסערה בוייטנאם) (Leg 10)
34. The Painful Elimination (ההדחה הכואבת) (Leg 10)
35. The Battle for a Place in the Finals (הקרב על מקום בגמר) (Leg 11)
36. The Fateful Day (היום הגורלי) (Leg 11)
37. The Last Elimination (ההדחה האחרונה) (Leg 11)
38. The Final Shock: Part 1 (הלם בגמר: חלק א) (Leg 12)
39. The Final Shock: Part 2 (הלם בגמר: חלק ב) (Leg 12)

== Race summary ==
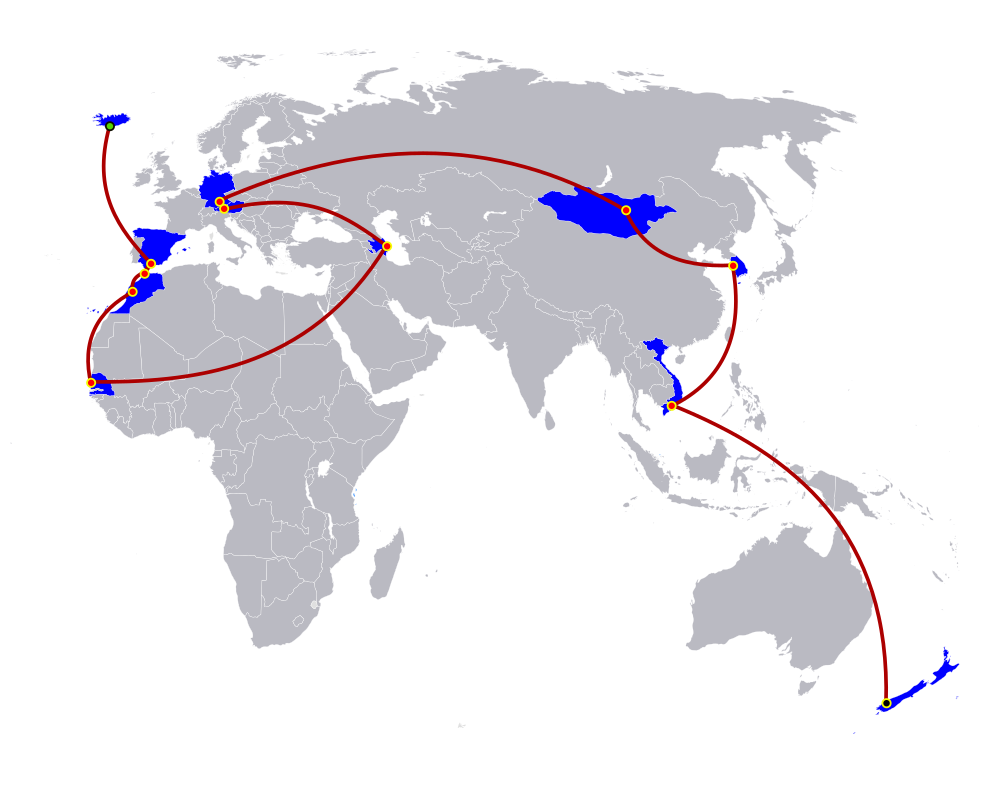
The route map of HaMerotz LaMillion 9.

Destinations	Air travel Rail travel Water travel Bus travel Helicopter travel Bicycle travel Gondola travel
Route Markers	צומת (Detour) מחסום (Roadblock) קיצור דרך (Fast Forward) דו–קרב (Duel) פרסה (U-Turn) עצור (Yield) חילופי זוגות (Partner Swap) נקודת סיום (Pit Stop)

=== Leg 1 (Iceland) ===
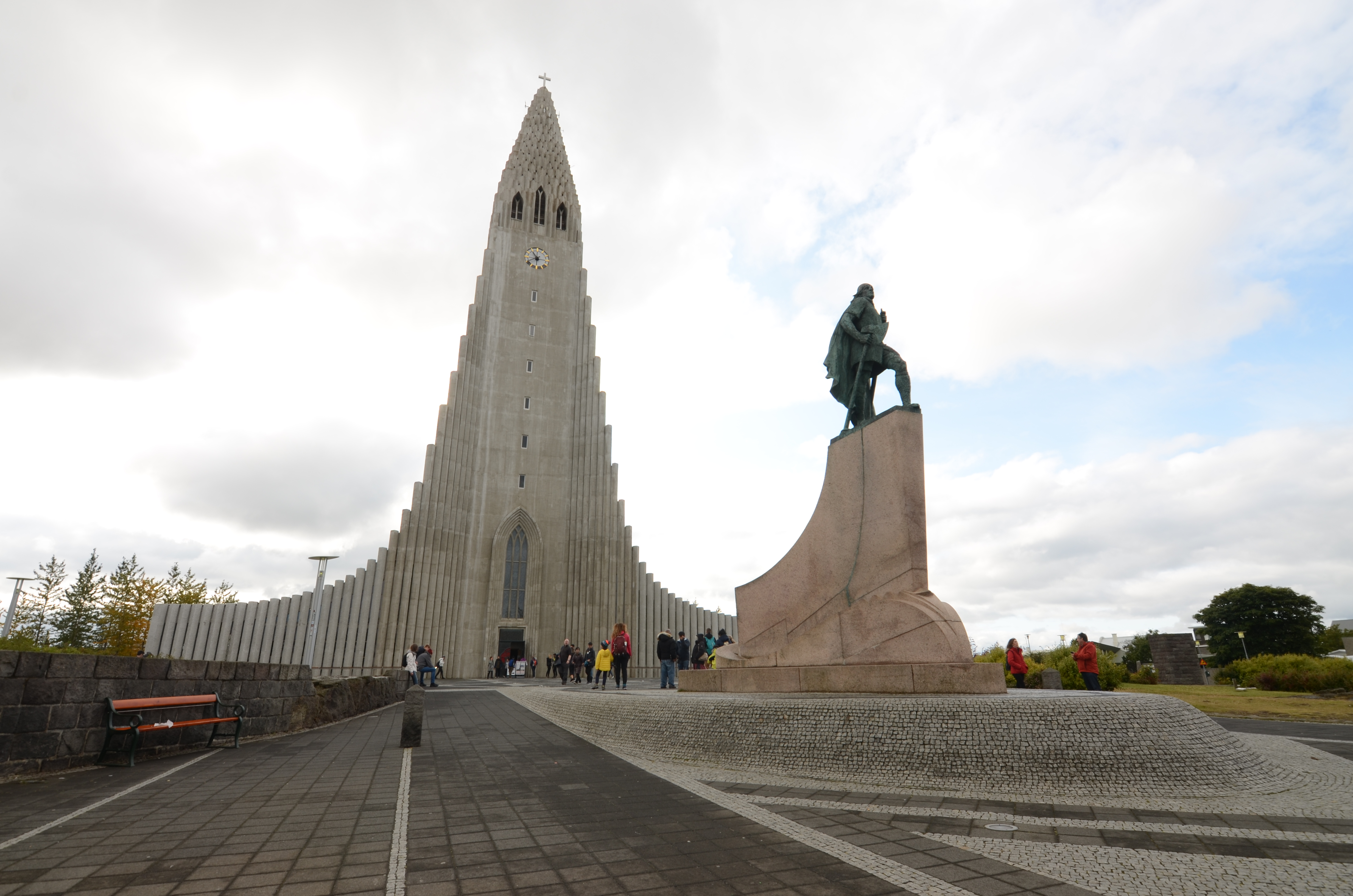
After encountering their first U-Turn Vote, teams had to search for their next task from atop Hallgrímskirkja in Reykjavík.

- Airdates: 1, 2 & 7 July 2024
- Eliminated: Michal & Elrom

Locations

- Mýrdalshreppur, Iceland (Katla Geopark) (Starting Line)
- Reykjavík (City Center – Bæjarins Beztu Pylsur)
- Reykjavík (Hallgrímskirkja)
- Reykjavík (Sandholt Bakery)
- Bláskógabyggð (Heiðarbær – Johannes Animal Farm)
- Reykjavík (Álafoss Wool Store)
- Reykjavík (Reykjavíkurtjörn – Iðnaðarmannahúsið)

Episode summary (Episode 1)

- Teams began the race at the Katla Geopark in Iceland. After finding their first clue at a nearby glacier, one team member had to guide their partner, who was ice climbing up a glacial wall, to retrieve the six necessary puzzle pieces needed to complete a snowflake puzzle.
- Teams were instructed to drive to the center of Reykjavík and find their next clue at a place associated with an American president. They had to figure out that it was Bæjarins Beztu Pylsur, a hot dog stand visited by Bill Clinton in 2004.

Episode summary (Episode 2)

- Teams were directed to Hallgrímskirkja and had to vote to U-Turn another team before searching inside the church. There, an organ player was playing "Ma'ale, Ma'ale" ("Up, Up") leaving teams to figure out that they had to go up to the bell tower. After purchasing tickets for the tower, teams received a sweater keychain that they would need later in the leg. Then, teams found their next clue instructing them to search for a building marked with an Amazing Race flag: the Sandholt bakery on Laugavegur.
- Outside the bakery, teams found a stand with 15 rjómabollur, a cream bun eaten during Bolludagur. Teams had to convince locals to purchase one for 500 króna and received their next clue if it contained jam. Otherwise, teams had to eat it before selling another. Teams then had to drive to a farm outside Reykjavík and find their next clue.

Episode summary (Episode 3)

- This season's first Detour was a choice between Sitting (לשבת) or Running (לרוץ). In Sitting, one team member had to guide a horse through a course. Their partner had to ride the horse while balancing a stein of beer on a wooden spoon. After filling a tube at the end of the course with beer, teams received their next clue. In Running, teams had to herd 20 sheep into a pen before receiving their next clue.
- After the Detour, teams found the U-Turn reveal board before driving to their next clue at the Álafoss Wool Store in Reykjavík. There, teams had to find a sweater that matched their keychain before receiving their next clue, which directed them to the Pit Stop: Iðnaðarmannahúsið along Reykjavíkurtjörn.

Additional notes

- Seven teams chose to use the U-Turn on Michal & Elrom.
- This leg was HaMerotz LaMillion's 100th overall leg.

=== Leg 2 (Iceland → Spain → Gibraltar → Morocco) ===
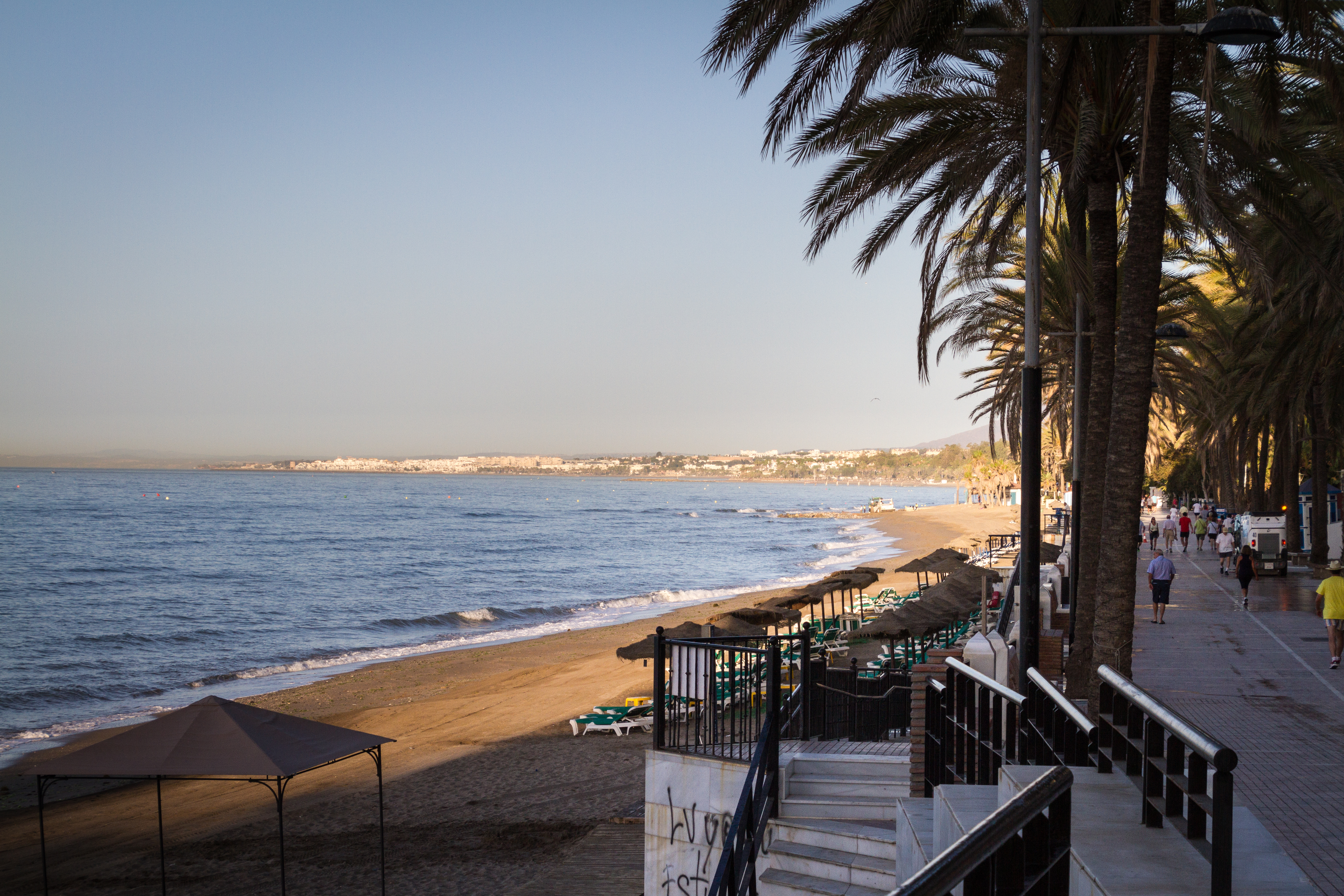
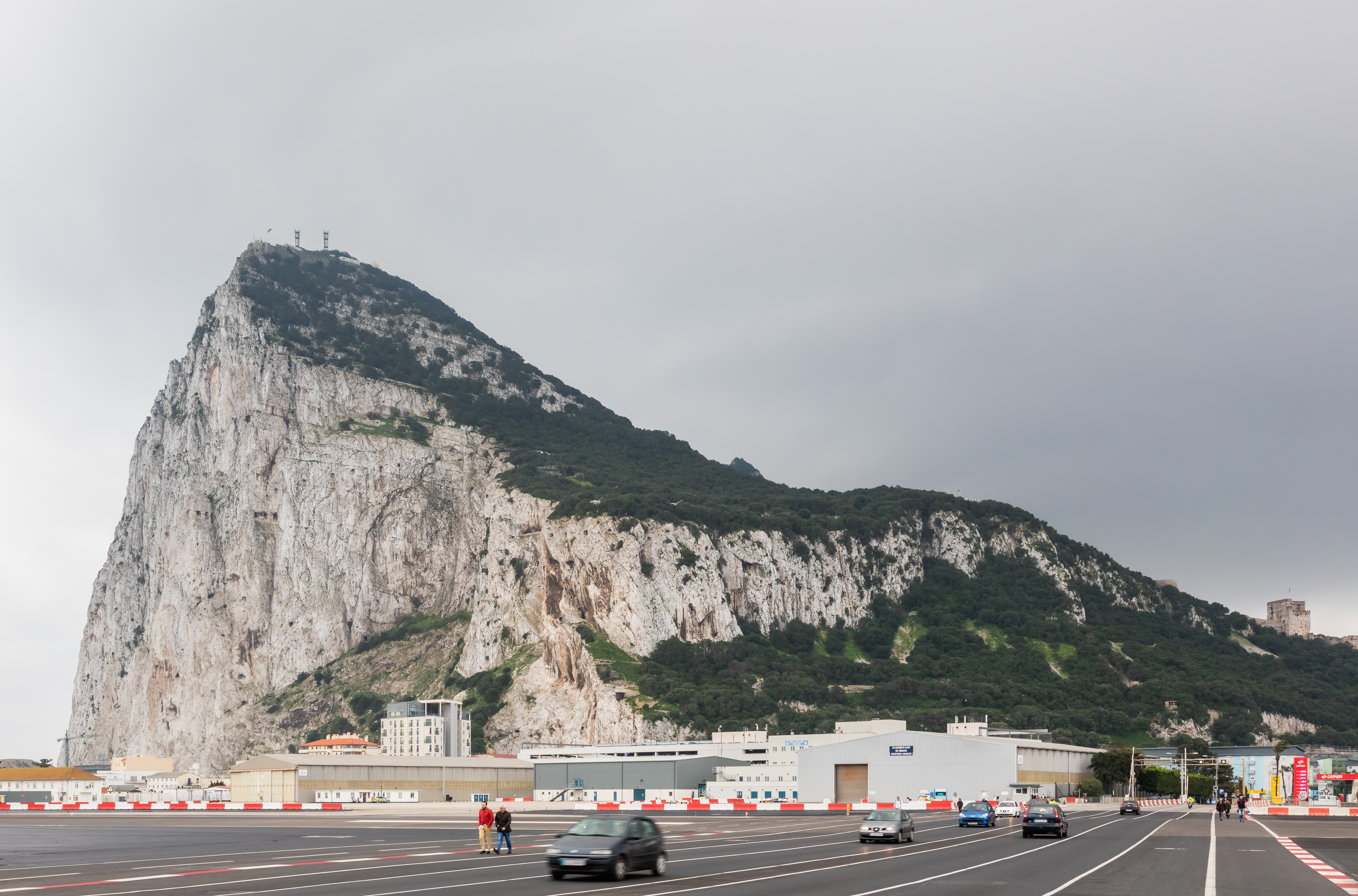
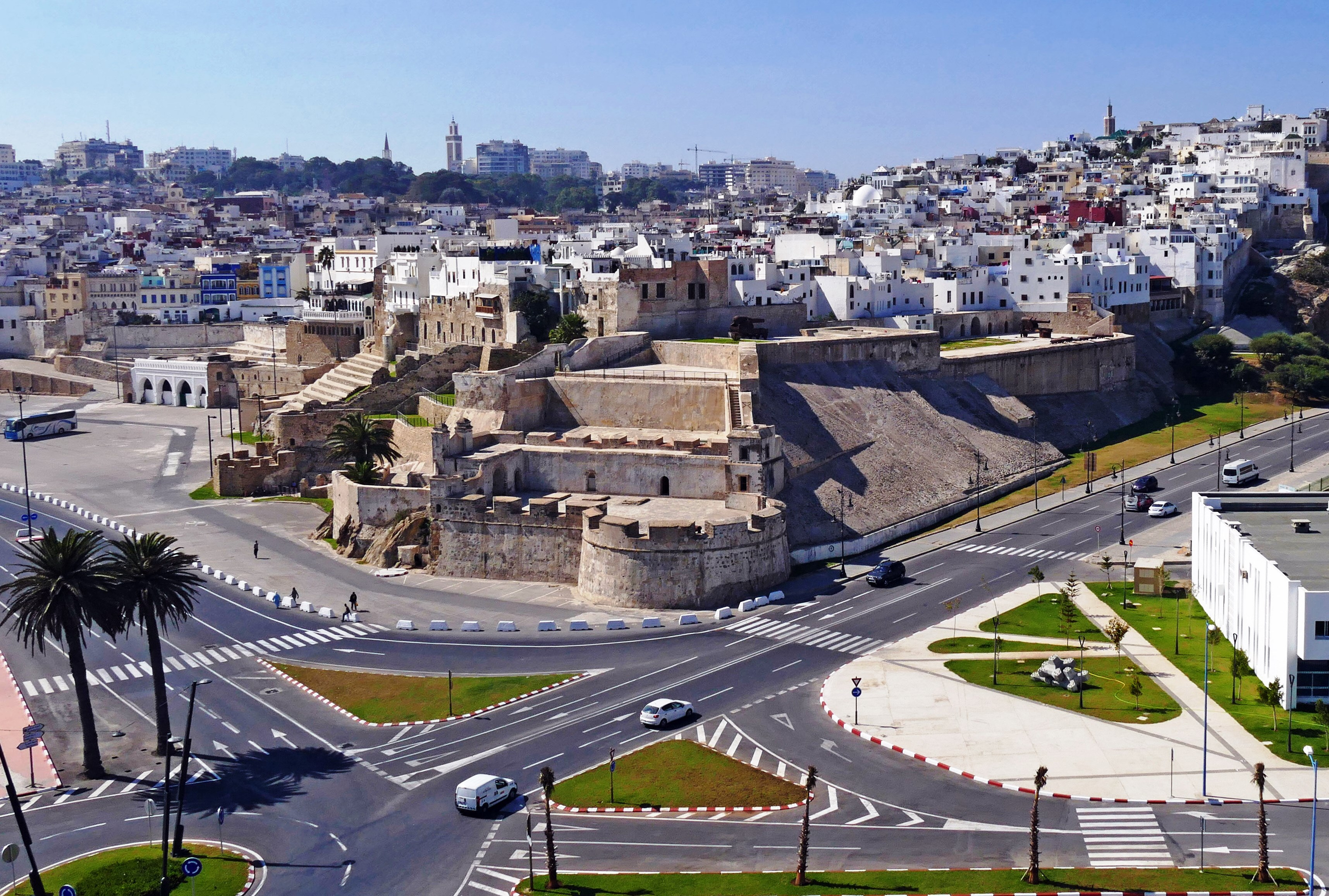
Within the span of 24 hours, teams visited Spain and the British exclave of Gibraltar before crossing the Strait of Gibraltar to Tangier, Morocco.
- Airdates: 8, 13, 16 & 17 July 2024
- Eliminated: Shahar & Ronit

Locations

- Reykjavík (Reykjavíkurtjörn – Iðnaðarmannahúsið)
- Reykjavík (Keflavík International Airport) → Málaga, Spain (Málaga Airport)
  - Málaga (Port of Málaga – El Cubo)
- Málaga (Plaza de la Merced)
- Marbella (La Pesquera del Faro)
- Marbella (Playa de Rio Real – Tourist Booth)
- Gibraltar (Grand Casemates Square)
- Algeciras, Spain (Port of Algeciras) → Tangier, Morocco (Tanger Med)
- Tangier (Bab El Marsa – Ahmed Halia's Hat Store) (Overnight Rest)
- Tangier (Terrasse Borj al-Hajoui)
- Tangier (Jawad's Souvenir Store)
- Tangier (Tanger-Ville Railway Terminal)

Episode summary (Episode 4)

- At the start of this leg, teams were instructed to fly to Málaga, Spain. Once there, teams found a car outside of the airport with their next clue.
- For this season's only Fast Forward, one team had to drive to El Cubo. There, the team had to find a trumpet and a violin, musicians to play those instruments as well as a provided piano and drum set, and three people who had to sing "The Rain in Spain" from My Fair Lady in Hebrew. Lior & Sapir attempted the Fast Forward but were unsuccessful.
- Teams who did not attempt the Fast Forward had to drive to Plaza de la Merced. There, teams had to arrange six glass panels so as to recreate Pablo Picasso's Three Musicians before receiving their next clue.

Episode summary (Episode 5)

- After voting to Yield another team, teams had to drive to La Pesquera del Faro in Marbella. There, teams had to take a tapas order, pick out the correct food items from a spread, serve the customers, and calculate the bill before receiving their next clue.
- Teams then had to travel on foot to a tourist booth, which had their next clue. There, teams had to listen to "The Ballad of John and Yoko" and find the location where John Lennon and Yoko Ono were married – Gibraltar – before receiving their next clue.

Episode summary (Episode 6)

- After driving to Grand Casemates Square in Gibraltar, teams had to search the musicians of the Royal Gibraltar Regiment Band, all of whom were wearing 12 medals, for the one person wearing a different medal, which depicted the Lalla Abla Mosque, before receiving their next clue. If teams chose an incorrect medal, they had to march a lap around the square with the band while playing an instrument before making another choice.
- Teams then had to drive to the Port of Algeciras, travel by ferry to Tangier, Morocco, and choose a departure time outside Ahmed Halia's Hat Store. Teams received varying sleeping accommodations – sleeping bags, personal home, hostel, or hotel – based on their departure time.

Episode summary (Episode 7)

- In this season's first Roadblock, one team member had to join a group of Gnawa musicians and continuously twirl the tassel on a chechia for one minute while playing krakebs before receiving their next clue. The non-participating member had to play a drum.
- After the Roadblock, teams found the Yield reveal board before traveling on foot to Jawad's Souvenir Store. There, teams had to search the store for a telephone number. Teams had to realize that number of flashes from lanterns corresponded to the telephone number before using a nearby payphone to learn the name of the Pit Stop: the Tanger-Ville Railway Terminal.

Additional note

- Four teams chose to use the Yield on Racheli & Miri and Sahar & Yiftach.

=== Leg 3 (Morocco) ===
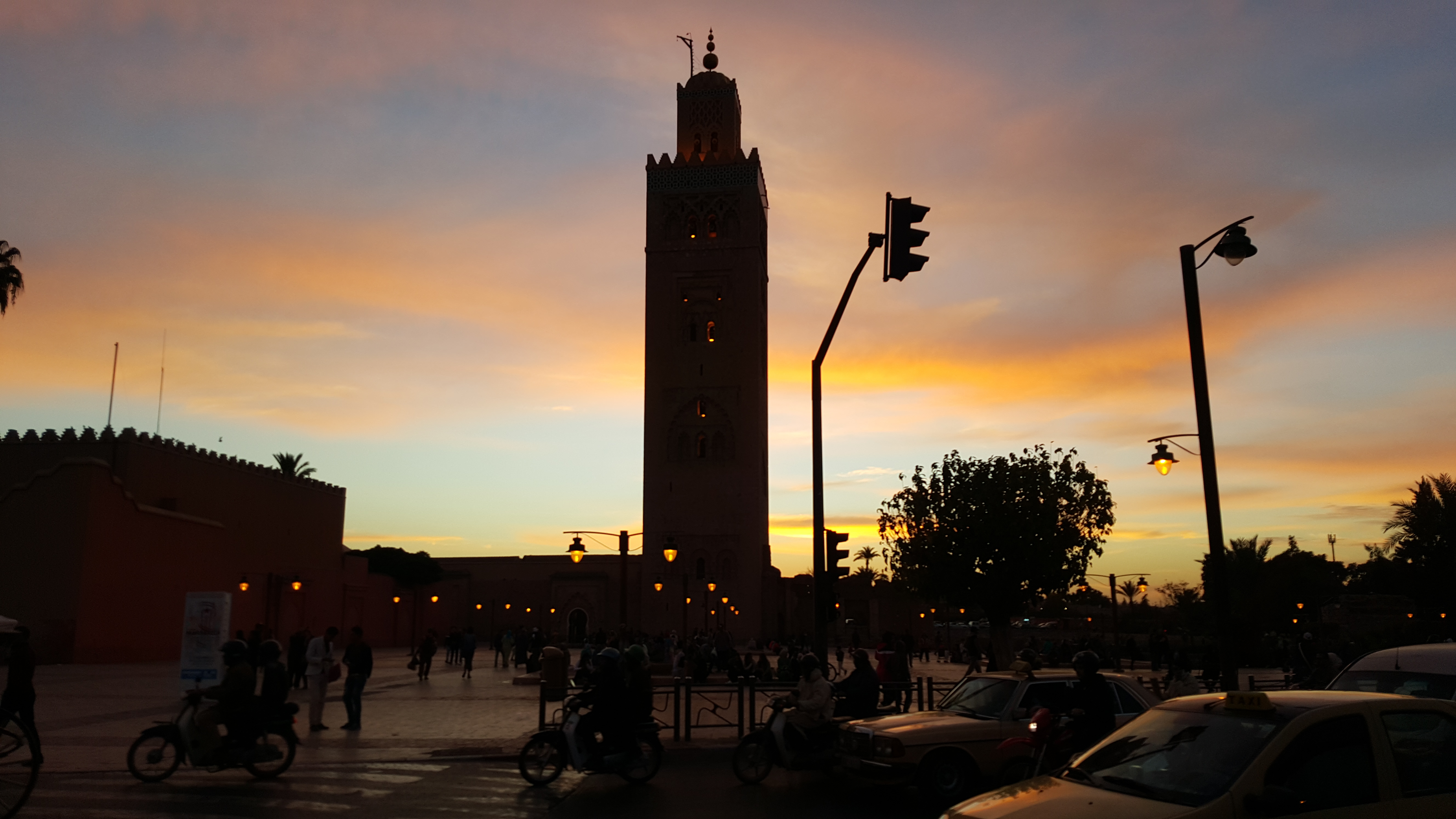
The third Pit Stop was located outside of the Koutoubia Mosque in Marrakesh.

- Airdates: 20, 22 & 23 July 2024
- Eliminated: Racheli & Miri

Locations

- Tangier (Tanger-Ville Railway Terminal)
- Tangier (Tanger-Ville Railway Terminal) → Marrakesh (Marrakesh Railway Station)
- Agafay (Agafay Desert Camp)
- Lalla Takerkoust (Lac Lalla Takerkoust)
- Oumnass (Oumnasse Kasbah)
- Marrakesh (Mohammed V School)
- Marrakesh (Bab Debbagh Tanneries)
- Marrakesh (Mellah – Place des Ferblantiers)
- Marrakesh (Jemaa el-Fnaa)
- Marrakesh (Koutoubia Mosque)

Episode summary (Episode 8)

- At the start of this leg, teams were instructed to travel by train to Marrakesh. After finding their next clue outside of the train station, teams were driven to the Agafay Desert Camp. There, teams had to lead out a herd of camels and arrange them in order based on a brain teaser scroll before receiving their next clue.
- After voting to Yield another team, teams traveled to Lac Lalla Takerkoust, where they had to scrub a large piece of Moroccan black soap until they could reveal an image of their next destination: the Oumnasse Kasbah.

Episode summary (Episode 9)

- For this season's first Duel, one racer from each team had to dress as Princess Tamina from Prince of Persia: The Sands of Time. The other racer, who was dressed as Prince Dastan, had to collect apples from the kasbah's inner perimeter, including from a large staircase, and reunite with their partner. The first team to finish received their next clue, while the losing team had to wait for another team. The team that lost the final Duel had to wait out a 15-minute penalty. Racheli & Miri lost the final Duel.
- After the Duel, teams had to travel to the Mohammed V School in Marrakesh.
- In this leg's Roadblock, one team member had to deliver leather to the tanneries near Bab Debbagh Gate and dip them into a dyeing vat until they found one that revealed an X when fully dyed, which they could exchange for their next clue.

Episode summary (Episode 10)

- After the Roadblock, teams found the Yield reveal board before traveling in a marked tuk-tuk to Place des Ferblantiers in the Mellah quarter of the city. There, teams had to use a bicycle-powered juicer to make orange juice and had to sell ten cups for five Moroccan dirhams apiece before receiving their next clue.
- Teams then had to travel to Jemaa el-Fnaa and search through a set of cassettes for one that played a familiar song: "Tipat Mazal" ("A Bit of Luck") by Zehava Ben. Once found, teams had to check in at the Pit Stop, which was depicted on the correct cassette: the Koutoubia Mosque.

Additional note

- Six teams chose to use the Yield on Racheli & Miri.

=== Leg 4 (Morocco → Senegal) ===
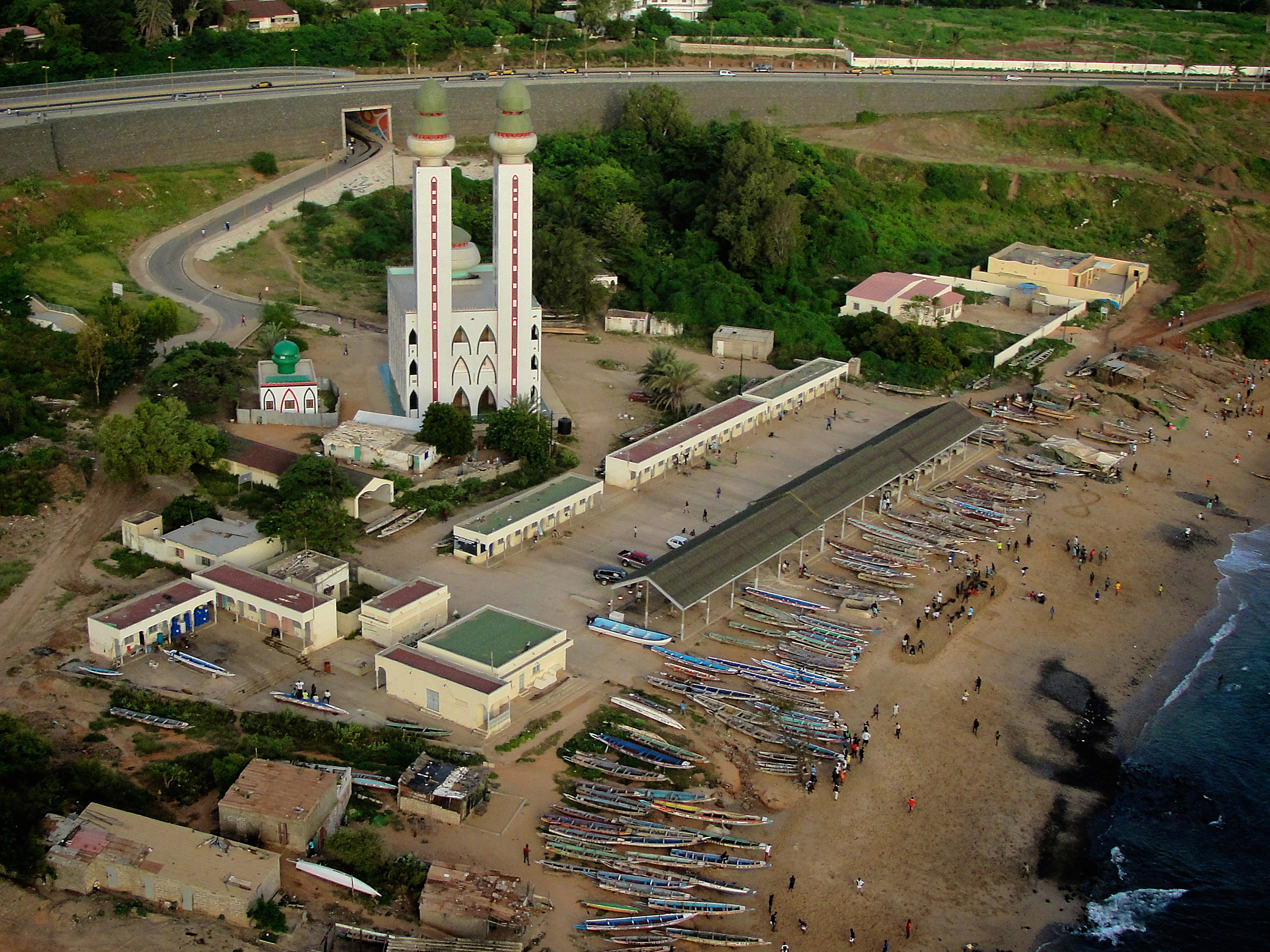
Teams laid out fish to dry by the Mosque of Divinity in Dakar.

- Airdates: 1, 3, 5 & 6 August 2024
- Eliminated: Amit & Rotem

Locations

- Marrakesh (Koutoubia Mosque)
- Marrakesh (Marrakesh Menara Airport) → Dakar, Senegal (Blaise Diagne International Airport)
- Dakar (King Fahd Palace Hôtel)
- Dakar (Fass Market)
- Dakar (Mosque of Divinity)
- Dakar (Autonomous Port of Dakar) → Gorée Island (Gorée Island Ferry Terminal)
- Gorée Island (Le Petit Thio Baguette)
- Gorée Island (Gorée Island Ferry Terminal) → Dakar (Autonomous Port of Dakar)
- Dakar (C.I.C.E.S Industrial Area)
- Dakar (Ouakam Camp School)
- Dakar (African Renaissance Monument)

Episode summary (Episode 11)

- At the start of this leg, teams were instructed to fly to Dakar, Senegal. Once there, teams received their next clue at the King Fahd Palace Hôtel and had to travel to Fass Market. There, teams had to load 30 watermelons onto a two-wheeled cart and deliver then to a marked stall before receiving their next clue.
- After voting to Yield another team, teams had to travel to the beach near the Mosque of Divinity, find a boat that matches a design on a card, travel out into the Atlantic Ocean, retrieve a bundle of fish from a boat, and lay out on a drying table only the species of fish present on an example back on shore before receiving their next clue.

Episode summary (Episode 12)

- Teams had to sign up for a ferry to Gorée Island. The following day, teams found their next clue on the island and had to make seven baguette deliveries while carrying a basket of baguettes on one racer's head before receiving their next clue.

Episode summary (Episode 13)

- Teams had to return to Dakar and travel to the C.I.C.E.S Industrial Area, where they found the Yield reveal board and their next clue.
- For this leg's Duel, two teams had to complete against each other in a game of life-sized fooseball. The first team to score three goals received their next clue, while the losing team had to wait for another team. The team that lost the final Duel had to wait out a 15-minute penalty. Amit & Rotem lost the final Duel.

Episode summary (Episode 14)

- After the Duel, teams had to travel to the Ouakam Camp School. There, one team member had to perform a dance, where each move corresponded to a letter, and their partner had to decode the word RENAISSANCE. Teams then had to figure out the location of the Pit Stop: the African Renaissance Monument.

Additional notes

- Due to news coverage of the Majdal Shams attack and the 2024 Haret Hreik airstrike, the episodes for this leg were delayed by nearly a week.
- Three teams chose to use the Yield on Sahar & Yiftach.

=== Leg 5 (Senegal → Azerbaijan) ===
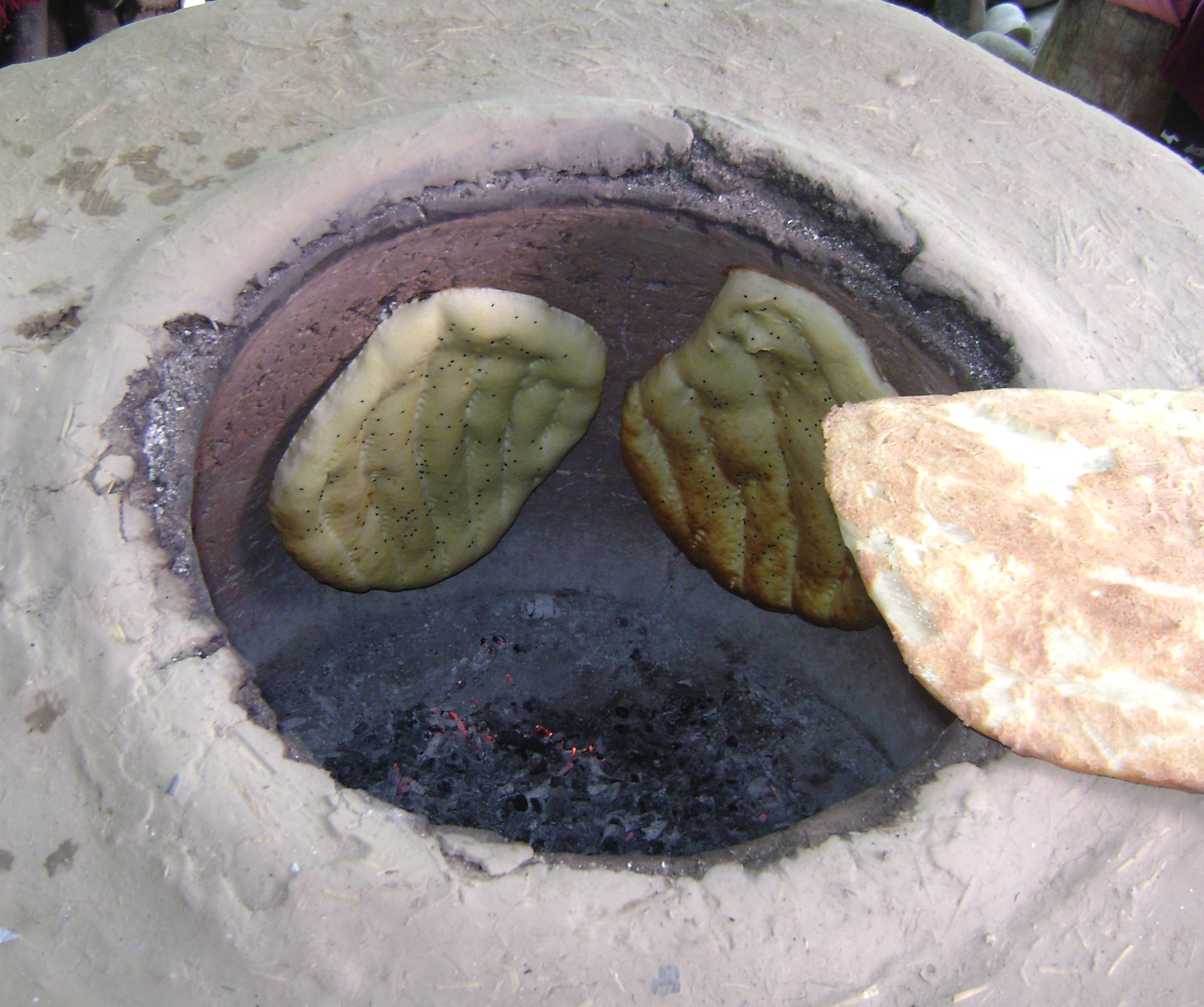
While in Baku, teams had to bake and deliver təndir çörəyi.

- Airdates: 10, 13, 17 & 19 August 2024
- Eliminated: Idan & Guy

Locations

- Dakar (African Renaissance Monument)
- Dakar (Blaise Diagne International Airport) → Baku, Azerbaijan (Heydar Aliyev International Airport)
- Baku (Balaxanı – Sabir Park)
- Baku (Dağüstü Park)
- Baku (Mugam Club Restaurant)
- Baku (UNBAR)
- Baku (Muse Cafe)
- Baku (White City Boulevard)

Episode summary (Episode 15)

- At the start of this leg, teams were instructed to fly to Baku, Azerbaijan. Once there, teams found their next clue outside of the airport and had to fill a Lada Riva with exactly five liters of gasoline using only three, seven, and ten-liter cans. Teams were then driven to Sabir Park in Balaxanı.
- After voting to Yield another team, teams had to stretch and bake twenty 35-centimeter pieces of bread called təndir çörəyi in a tandir, an earth oven, before receiving their next clue.

Episode summary (Episode 16)

- After transporting their bread to Dağüstü Park, teams had to carry them and a table up 182 stairs. Along the way, teams had to notice the names of ingredients listed on the stairs and deliver the amount that corresponded to the step number for each ingredient before receiving their next clue.
- Teams were then brought to the Mugam Club Restaurant, where they had to convince 20 people to stand on an Azerbaijani carpet for 30 seconds before receiving a business card that listed their next destination: UNBAR.

Episode summary (Episode 17)

- After traveling by taxi to the nightclub, teams had to say a password – HAPPY HOUR – that was visible on the business card they received at a low angle before receiving their next clue and finding the Yield reveal board.
- In this leg's Roadblock, one team member had to replicate a flair bartending routine and make a fire daiquiri before receiving their next clue.

Episode summary (Episode 18)

- After the Roadblock, teams had to travel to the Muse Cafe. There, teams had to sample 20 jams and identify their flavors before receiving their next clue, which directed them to the Pit Stop: White City Boulevard. Teams were advised to search for the Pit Stop near ZAFAR Cafe.

Additional note

- Three teams chose to use the Yield on Udi & Matan.

=== Leg 6 (Azerbaijan → Austria → Germany) ===
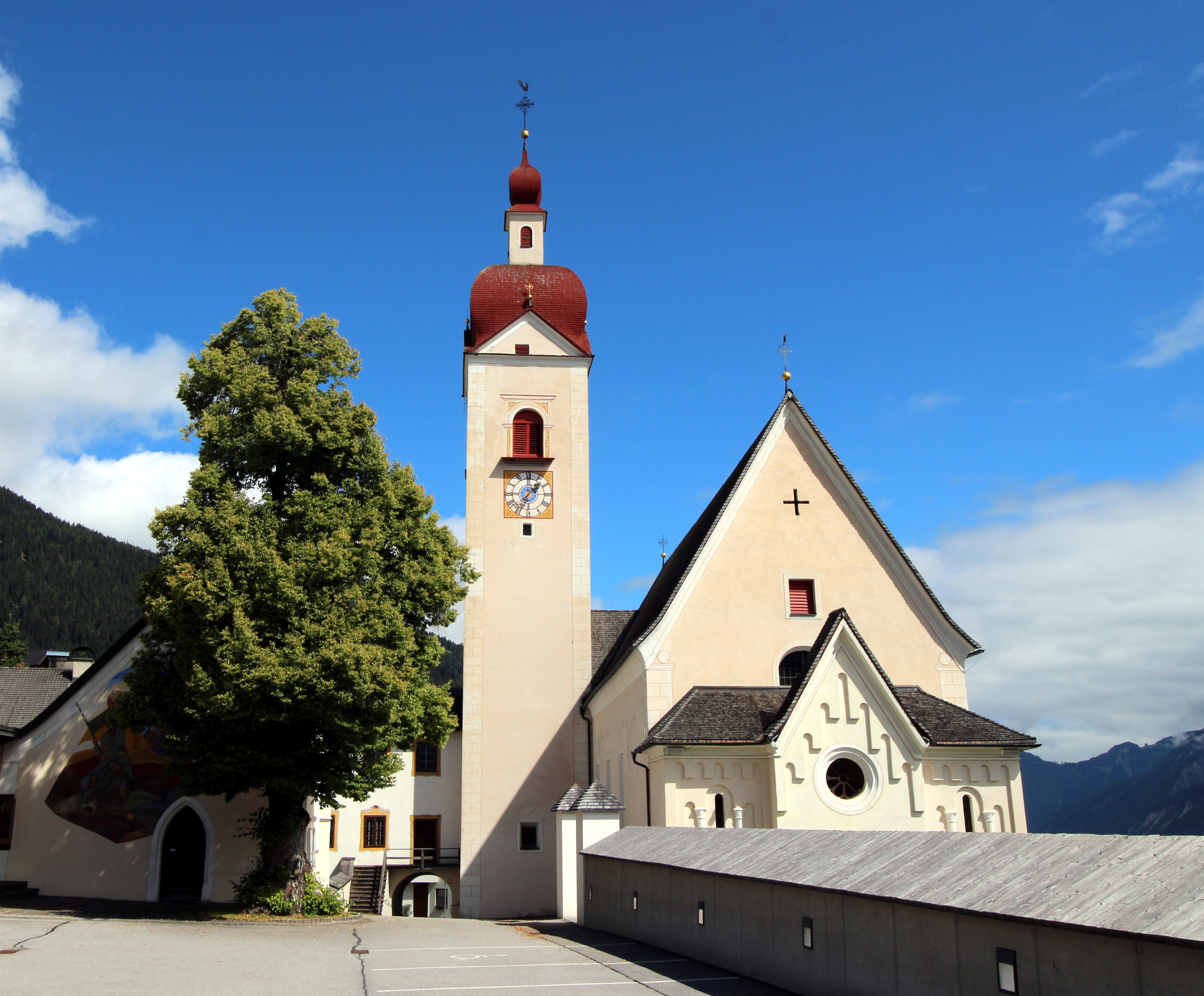
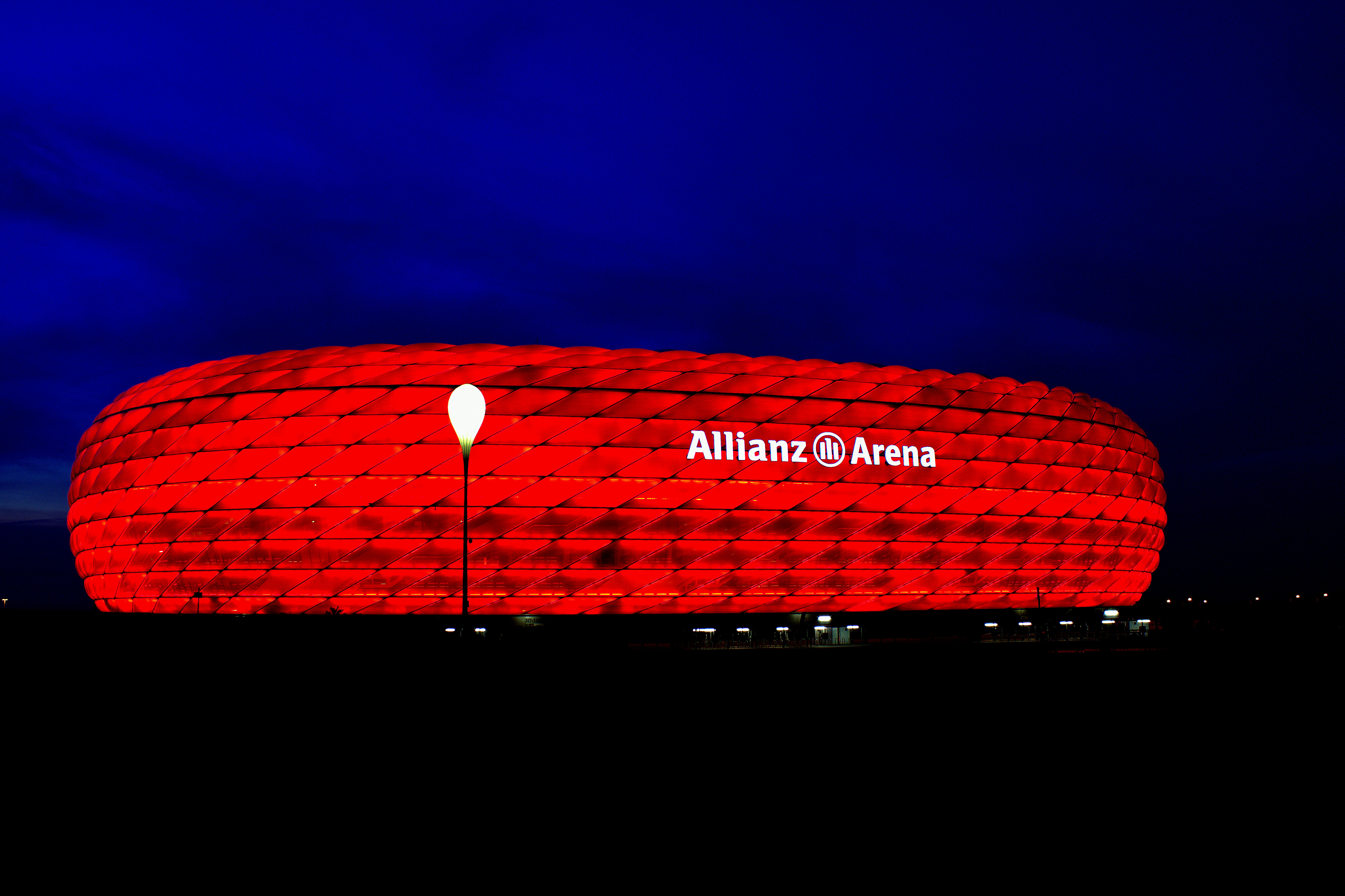
After exploring the Austrian Alps of East Tyrol, teams finished the leg in Munich outside Allianz Arena.
- Airdates: 20, 22 & 24 August 2024
- Eliminated: Hasi & Yarin

Locations

- Baku (White City Boulevard)
- Baku (Heydar Aliyev International Airport) → Innsbruck, Austria (Innsbruck Airport)
- Abfaltersbach (HELLA Headquarters)
- Assling (Pfarrkirche Hl. Dreifaltigkeit Assling)
- Heinfels (Loacker Factory)
- Landeggwald (Parkplatz Landeckwald)
- Munich, Germany (Augustiner-Keller Biergarten)
- Munich (Filmtheater Sendlinger Tor (in German))
- Munich (Platzl 1)
- Munich (Allianz Arena)

Episode summary (Episode 19)

- At the start of this leg, teams were instructed to fly to Tyrol, Austria. Once there, teams found their next clue outside of the HELLA Head Office in Abfaltersbach and were then driven to Pfarrkirche Hl. Dreifaltigkeit Assling in Assling. From the church, teams had to find Hanny Nahmias, who was dressed as Maria von Trapp, sing "My Favorite Things", and bring 11 items found in the song to Nahmias before receiving their next clue.
- After voting to U-Turn another team, teams were driven to the Loacker Factory in Heinfels. There, Gnometti gave teams a box of chocolate wafers with their next clue. Teams then had to make 250 grams of Quadratini chocolate wafers before receiving their next clue, which directed them to Parkplatz Landeckwald at the base of Grossglockner.

Episode summary (Episode 20)

- This leg's Detour was a choice between Split (לחלק) or Slip (להחליק). In Split, teams had to saw off four wooden disks from a log using a two-man saw before receiving their next clue. In Slip, both team members had to ride a miniature bicycle down a slope before receiving their next clue.
- After the Detour, teams found the U-Turn reveal board and then learned that they were traveling to Munich, Germany. Once there, teams found their next clue at the Augustiner-Keller Biergarten, where they had to play an Oktoberfest party game called beer puppeteer. Using marionette strings, one team member had to lift a beer glass to their partner, who had to spit the beer into a stein until it was full before receiving their next clue.

Episode summary (Episode 21)

- Teams had to travel by taxi to Filmtheater Sendlinger Tor and search for their next clue, which they had to figure out was with a cleaning man, while the cinema played The Blue Angel.
- After traveling to Platzl 1, teams received a schmalznudel and had to figure out that they had to travel to the Pit Stop outside of a building that resembled the pastry's takeaway container: the Allianz Arena.

Additional note

- Three teams chose to use the U-Turn on Lior & Sapir.

=== Leg 7 (Germany → Mongolia) ===
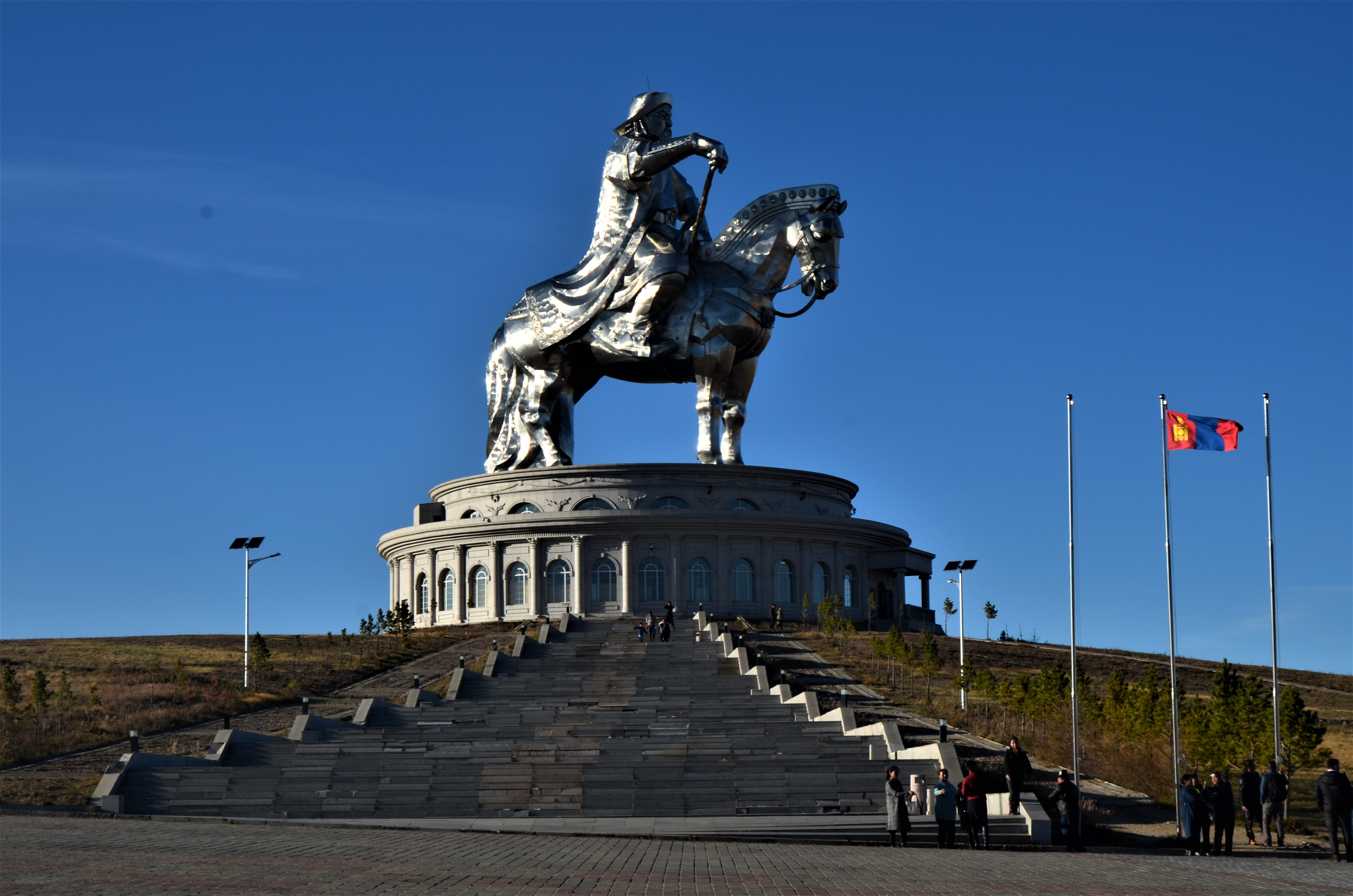
Teams had to pass through rows of Mongol warriors at the Genghis Khan Equestrian Statue in Ulaanbaatar.

- Airdates: 26, 27 & 31 August 2024
- Quit: Modi & Miki

Locations

- Munich (Allianz Arena)
- Munich (Munich Airport) → Ulaanbaatar, Mongolia (Chinggis Khaan International Airport)
- Ulaanbaatar (Ibis Styles Ulaanbaatar Polaris)
- Terelj (Gorkhi-Terelj National Park)
- Terelj (Wadi Terelj)
- Ulaanbaatar (Genghis Khan Equestrian Statue)
- Ulaanbaatar (Sky Resort – HUN Theatre)
- Ulaanbaatar (Dashchoilin Monastery & Khan Bank)
- Ulaanbaatar (Zaisan Memorial)

Episode summary (Episode 22)

- At the start of this leg, teams were instructed to fly to Ulaanbaatar, Mongolia. Once there, teams found their next clue outside of the Ibis Styles Ulaanbaatar Polaris, voted to U-Turn another team, and boarded a van to Gorkhi-Terelj National Park. After arriving at a nomadic village in the park, team members had to complete a welcome ceremony by each drinking a bowl of airag – fermented yak milk – before receiving their next clue.
- After donning nomadic clothing, teams had to furnish the interior of a ger so that it matched the one where they drank the airag before receiving their next clue, which directed them to Wadi Terelj. Teams could re-enter the ger, but they had to eat a dried cheese snack called aaruul before refreshing their memory.

Episode summary (Episode 23)

- This leg's Detour was a choice between Burn (לשרוף) or Collect (לאסוף). In Burn, teams had to shoot flaming arrows with a Mongol bow until they could strike and ignite a target before receiving their next clue. In Collect, team members were tied together at the waists and had to collect dung, which nomads dry and use as fuel. One team member had to scoop the dung over their heads and fill a basket on their partner's back before receiving their next clue.
- After the Detour, teams found the U-Turn reveal board before traveling to the Genghis Khan Equestrian Statue. There, teams had to pass through twelve rows of Mongol warriors before receiving their next clue. Only one warrior in each row allowed teams to pass, while the others blocked them and sent them back to the start.

Episode summary (Episode 24)

- After traveling to the HUN Theatre, teams had to perform a Mongolian dance called biyelgee before receiving their next clue.
- Teams then had to travel to the Dashchoilin Monastery. There, teams had to count the number of prayer wheels at the monastery and use that number as a PIN (5-8-5) to withdraw money from a nearby ATM needed for a taxi to the Pit Stop: the Zaisan Memorial. Once there, teams had to climb over 600 stairs before reaching the mat.

Additional notes

- Four teams chose to use the U-Turn on Udi & Matan.
- When arriving at the Pit Stop, Modi & Miki announced their intention to quit the race on account of the exhaustion Miki was suffering from the last few legs. Yehuda then checked them in at the mat for one last time as the sixth team to arrive before exiting the race for good. Udi & Matan, the last team to check in, were therefore spared from elimination.

=== Leg 8 (Mongolia → South Korea) ===
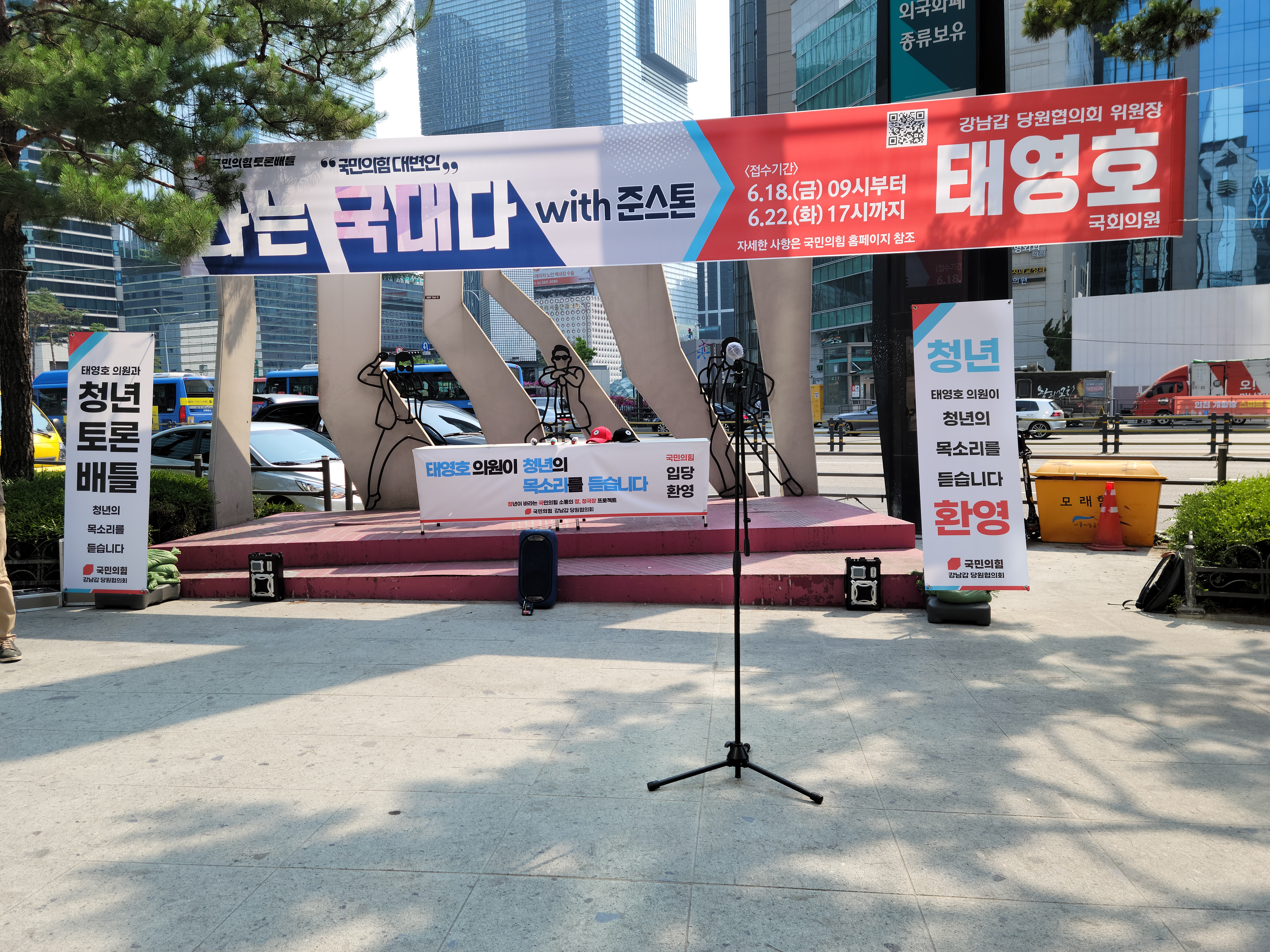
Teams had to travel to the Gangnam Style Horse Dance Stage, before heading to K-Star Road where they had to match 5 K-pop songs and bands

- Airdates: 2, 3 & 5 September 2024

Locations

- Ulaanbaatar (Zaisan Memorial)
- Ulaanbaatar (Chinggis Khaan International Airport) → Seoul, South Korea (Incheon International Airport)
- Seoul (Swiss Grand Hotel Seoul)
- Seoul (Myeong-dong – SUPY & K-Beauty Shop)
- Seoul (Myeong-dong Station → Gangnam Station)
- Seoul (Gangnam Style Horse Dance Stage)
- Seoul (K-Star Road)
- Seoul (Some Sevit)
- Seoul (Sogang University)
- Seoul (MBC Studio)

Episode summary (Episode 25)

- At the start of this leg, teams were instructed to fly to Seoul, South Korea. Once there, teams found their next clue outside of the Swiss Grand Hotel Seoul and then traveled to SUPY in Myeong-dong, where teams had to watch a video of a K-beauty star. Teams then had to find the products used in the video at the nearby K-Beauty Shop and return to SUPY, where the cosmetics were applied to them before receiving their next clue and K-pop clothes.
- After voting to U-Turn another team, teams had to decipher an image, which depicted the "Gangnam Style" dance, and figure out that they had to travel by subway to the Gangnam Style Horse Dance Stage, where they would find their next clue, a smartphone, and earbuds.
- After traveling to K-Star Road, teams had to listen to five K-pop songs and then take a selfie in front of the GangnamDol for each song's artist before receiving their next clue, which directed them to Some Sevit. Teams could ask locals for help but could only describe the songs through scat singing.

Episode summary (Episode 26)

- This season's final Detour was a choice between Trick (תעלול) or Treat (ממתק). In Trick, one team member had to operate a giant claw machine with their partner acting as the claws, who had to grab a toy marked with a flag and place it on a target before receiving their next clue. In Treat, teams had to carve four shapes into ppopgi without breaking them, much like in Squid Game, before receiving their next clue.
- After the Detour, teams found the U-Turn reveal board before traveling to Sogang University, where they were tied back-to-back and had to win a game of Red Light, Green Light before receiving their next clue and coffee. During the game, recordings of teams' loved ones played as a distraction, and after the game, teams could spend a moment with them.

Episode summary (Episode 27)

- After the loved ones visit, teams had to travel to MBC Studio, where they found their next clue.
- In this season's final Roadblock, one team member had to compete in King of Mask Singer. After all of the teams arrived, the chosen racers had to choose a new partner based on hints provided by the non-participating racers in full body costumes. Racers made their selections based on the order that they arrived at the studio. The new teams following the Partner Swap were: Avishai & Matan, Sahar & Anne, Inbar & Udi, Itzik & Lee, Lior & Yiftach, and Esti & Sapir.

Additional notes

- The first episode for this leg was initially set to air on 1 September but was postponed after the bodies of six Israeli hostages were recovered from Gaza.
- Three teams chose to use the U-Turn on Lior & Sapir.
- There was no elimination at the end of this leg; all the newly formed teams were instead instructed to continue racing.

=== Leg 9 (South Korea) ===
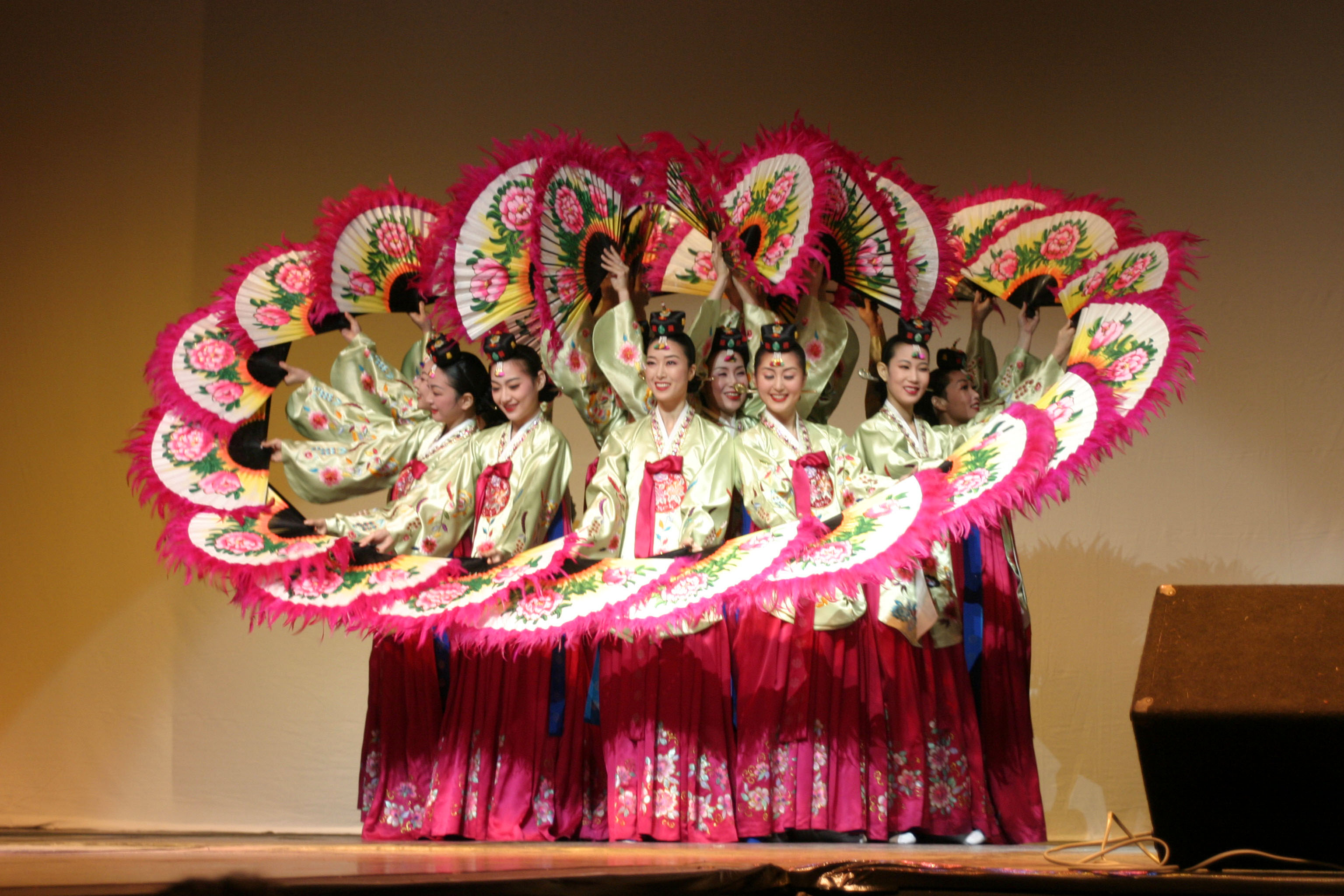
During their second leg in South Korea, the swapped teams had to watch a Buchaechum performance.

- Airdates: 7, 8, 10 & 11 September 2024
- Eliminated: Udi & Matan

Locations

- Seoul (Swiss Grand Hotel Seoul)
- Seoul (Namsan Park)
- Seoul (Samsung Hongdae Flagship Store)
- Seoul (Mokdong Ice Rink)
- Seoul (Gwangjang Market)
- Seoul (Bukchon Hanok Village)
- Seoul (CTS Art Hall)
- Seoul (Jangseungbaegi Station)
- Seoul (Bongeunsa Temple)

Episode summary (Episode 28)

- At the start of this leg, the newly formed teams were instructed to spend the night at the Swiss Grand Hotel Seoul. The following morning, teams gathered in Namsan Park and were told by Yehuda to travel to the Samsung flagship store in Hongdae. There, teams had to use a smartphone to blindly photograph the name of their next destination, which was written in Korean inside a box: the Mokdong Ice Rink.
- For this leg's Duel, two teams had to compete against each other in a game of tic-tac-toe on ice. One racer at a time had to ice skate across the rink, grab a colored disc, and place it on a game board. The first team to place three discs in a vertical, horizontal, or diagonal row received their next clue, while the losing team had to wait for another team. The team that lost the final Duel had to wait out a 15-minute penalty. During the Duel, Esti fell and injured her chin, which required stitches. After she & Sapir returned to the rink, they were informed that they could not perform this task and had to forfeit.

Episode summary (Episode 29)

- After the Duel, teams had to travel to Gwangjang Market, where they found a box with 28 skewers of Korean food. Teams had to pull out skewers and eat whatever was on them until they uncovered one with red and yellow colors before receiving their next clue.
- Teams then had to travel to Bukchon Hanok Village, don traditional hanbok clothing, and have a photograph taken before receiving their next clue. When teams received their photographs, they depicted another couple, and teams had to search the village for that couple, who had their next clue.

Episode summary (Episode 30)

- From the village, teams had to travel by taxi to CTS Art Hall. There, teams had to watch a Korean fan dance called Buchaechum, count the number of times that the colors of the South Korean flag – white, red, blue, and black – appear on the fans, and use those numbers (2-4-6-7) in a four-digit number lock to unlock their next clue. If teams had a two digit number for a color, then they had to add the two digits into one number.
- Teams then had to search outside Jangseungbaegi Station for the location of the next Pit Stop. Teams had to figure out that a taxi that passed by the station every few minutes was displaying Yehuda on its advertising screen as well as the name of the Pit Stop: the Bongeunsa Temple.

Episode summary (Episode 31)

- After teams arrived at Bongeunsa Temple, they faced one more task as individuals. Racers had to search among hundreds of Yeondeunghoe lanterns that adorn the temple for one with a prayer card that had their name written in Korean. Once both racers from an original team found their card, they could check in at the Pit Stop.

=== Leg 10 (South Korea → Vietnam) ===
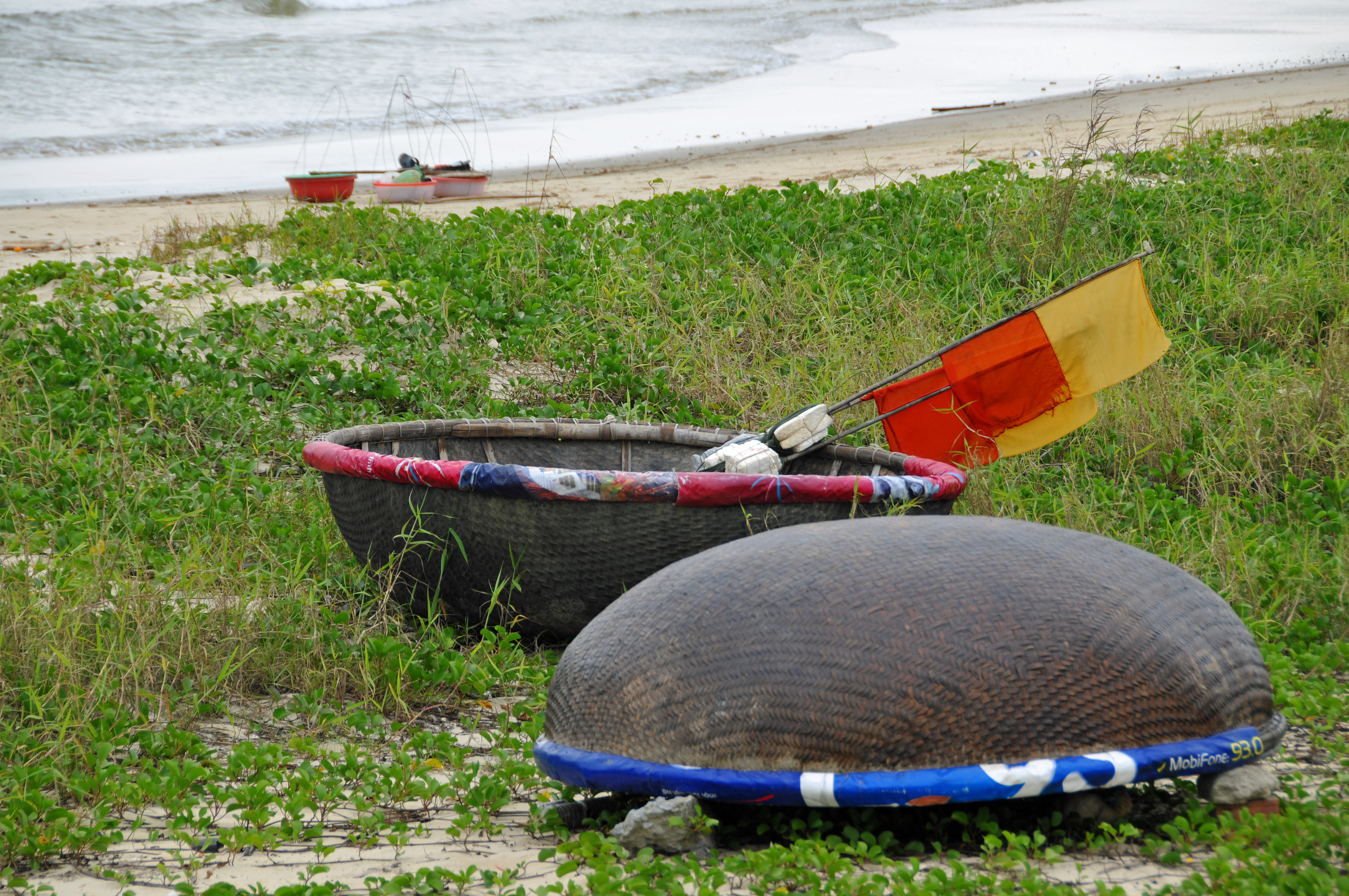
The Duel in Ho Chi Minh City had teams race in basket boats.

- Airdates: 14, 15 & 17 September 2024
- Eliminated: Sahar & Yiftach

Locations

- Seoul (Bongeunsa Temple)
- Seoul (Incheon International Airport) → Ho Chi Minh City, Vietnam (Tan Son Nhat International Airport)
- Ho Chi Minh City (New World Saigon Hotel)
- Ho Chi Minh City (Saigon Star International School)
- Ho Chi Minh City (Cà Phê Cà Pháo)
- Ho Chi Minh City (Sáu Cau Fishing Pond)
- Ho Chi Minh City (Bình Quới Tourist Village)
- Ho Chi Minh City (Saigon Central Post Office)
- Ho Chi Minh City (The Café Apartments – The Letter Cafe)
- Ho Chi Minh City (Hồ Thị Kỷ Flower Market)
- Ho Chi Minh City (Thủ Thiêm Park)

Episode summary (Episode 32)

- At the start of this leg, teams were instructed to fly to Ho Chi Minh City, Vietnam. Once there, teams received their next clue outside of the New World Saigon Hotel and had to travel to the Saigon Star International School. There, teams had to collect five kilograms of snails from a paddy field before receiving their next clue.
- Teams then had to deliver their snails to a vendor outside Cà Phê Cà Pháo. From there, teams had to travel by cycle rickshaw to Sáu Cau Fishing Pond, where they found their next clue.
- For this season's final Duel, two teams had to race in basket boats called thung chai. The first team to paddle their boat around a buoy and return to the start received their next clue, while the losing team had to wait for another team. The team that lost the final Duel had to wait out a 15-minute penalty. Lior & Sapir lost the final Duel.

Episode summary (Episode 33)

- After the Duel, teams had to keep traveling by cycle rickshaw to the Bình Quới Tourist Village. After voting to Yield another team, one team member had to sit on a seesaw while their blindfolded partner had to toss papayas into a basket on the other end until it dropped to the ground before receiving their next clue.
- Teams then had to travel by taxi to the Saigon Central Post Office. There, teams had to sort mail by finding the listed addresses on a map and placing them into bins with a corresponding district before receiving their next clue.

Episode summary (Episode 34)

- Teams received a letter and had to travel to its address: The Letter Cafe at The Café Apartments in Nguyễn Huệ Boulevard. There, teams had to drink a cup of coffee, search among 30 bags of coffee beans using taste and smell for the coffee that they drank, then bring a full sack of beans from the building's basement to the proprietor before receiving their next clue.
- After finding the Yield reveal board, teams had to travel to Hồ Thị Kỷ Flower Market and find an artificial flower hidden among the flowers in a shop without touching the flowers before receiving their next clue, which directed them to the Pit Stop: Thủ Thiêm Park. Every time teams were incorrect, they had to bring a bucket of flowers to the shop.

Additional note

- Three teams chose to use the Yield on Lee & Anne.

=== Leg 11 (Vietnam → New Zealand) ===
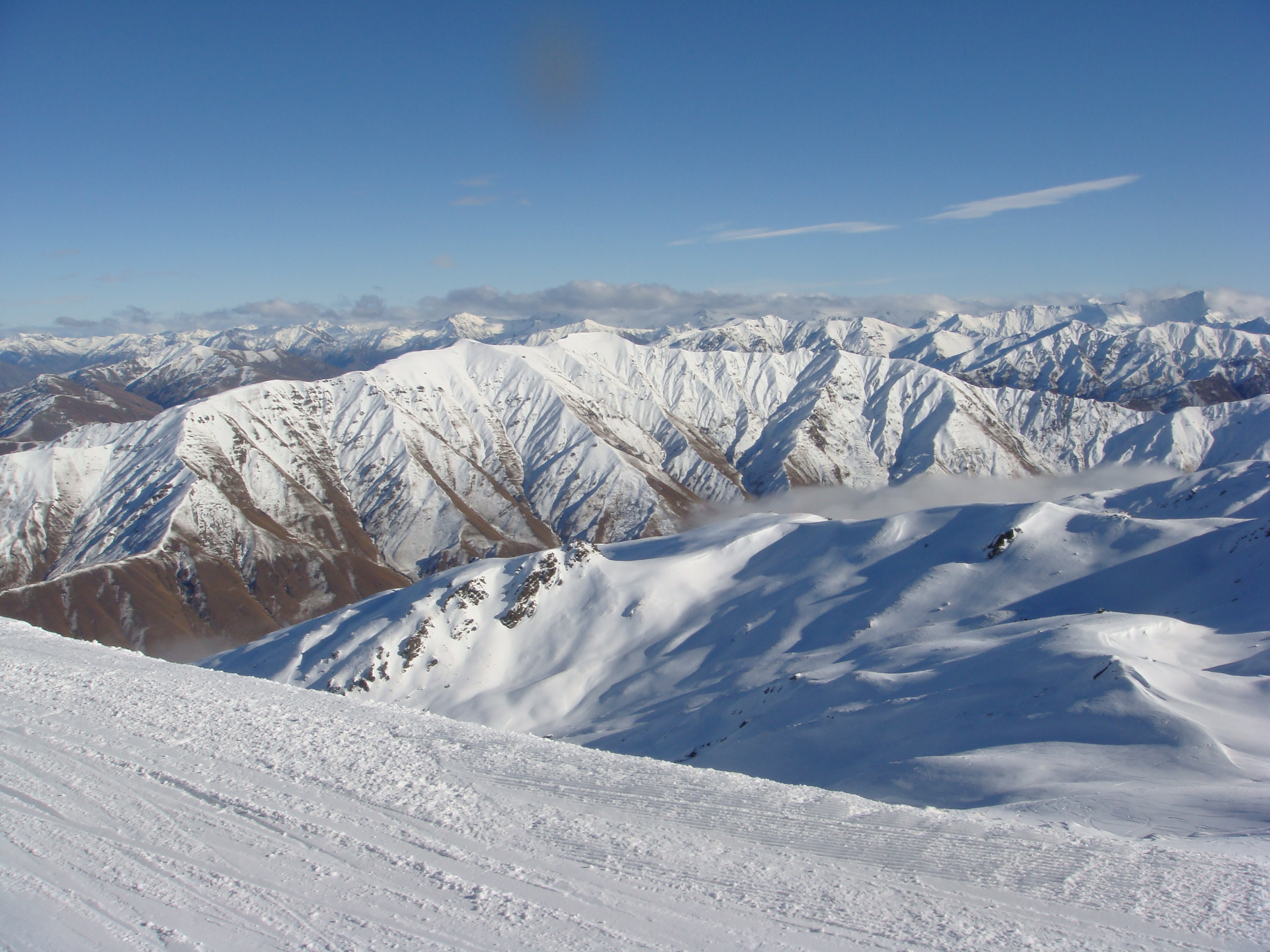
After landing in Queenstown, New Zealand, teams ventured up into The Remarkables.

- Airdates: 18, 21 & 22 September 2024
- Eliminated: Itzik & Esti

Locations

- Ho Chi Minh City (Thủ Thiêm Park)
- Ho Chi Minh City (Tan Son Nhat International Airport) → Queenstown, New Zealand (Queenstown Airport)
- Kawarau Falls (The Remarkables Ski Area)
- Arrowtown (Arrow River)
- Queenstown (Shotover River)
- Gibbston (178 Gibbston Back Road – Christine and Adam's Farm)
- Queenstown (Village Green)
- Queenstown (Queenstown Hill – Kerry Drive Jump Park)
- Queenstown (Queenstown Memorial Centre)
- Kawarau Falls (Hilton Queenstown Resort & Spa – Frankton Arm Ferry Wharf)

Episode summary (Episode 35)

- At the start of this leg, teams were instructed to fly to Queenstown, New Zealand. Once there, teams found their next clue outside of the airport and were driven to the ski resort at The Remarkables, where they had to find their next clue using an avalanche beacon. Teams then had to drive to the Arrow River and find a piece of gold in the frigid river before receiving their next clue.
- After driving to the Shotover River, teams had to ride a jetboat. During their ride, teams had to spot thirteen letters, each with an attached number, and then unscramble the letters in numerical order to form a phrase – SHEMOZZLE RACE – before receiving their next clue.

Episode summary (Episode 36)

- Teams had to drive to Christine and Adam's Farm in Gibbston and complete a four-stage obstacle course known as a Shemozzle. After donning burlap sacks, one racer had to pull their partner in a wheelbarrow through the course, over a narrow beam, and through a mud pit. Teams then had to crawl under a net, crawl through a tunnel of feathers, go down a slide, and deliver five intact kiwi eggs to the end of the course before receiving their next clue.
- After driving to Queenstown's village green, teams had to deflate a giant whoopee cushion – referencing the country's proposed agricultural emissions research levy – with the help of ten people before receiving their next clue.

Episode summary (Episode 37)

- Teams had to drive to Kerry Drive Jump Park, where they had to dress as kiwi birds and push an egg through a pump track using only their beaks until they crossed a finish line before receiving their next clue.
- Teams then had to drive to the Queenstown Memorial Centre and arrange twelve images of items they encountered in previous legs. When they finished, racers had to flip over their work station to reveal music notes. A string trio would play the notes, and if they played The Amazing Race theme song team received their next clue, which directed them to the Pit Stop: the Frankton Arm Ferry Wharf in Kawarau Falls. The correct answers were:

Correct answers
Leg	Image	Source	Note
1	American flag	Bæjarins Beztu Pylsur	D
1	Beer	Sitting Detour	F
3	Apple	Prince of Persia Duel	E
4	Stamp	Baguette Delivery	B
5	Cherries	Dağüstü Park	C
5	Strawberries	Fire Daiquiri Garnish	C
6	Rose	Maria's Favorite Things	B
6	Poodle	Maria's Favorite Things	A
7	Yak	Nomad Village	A
8	Salted Fish	Red Light Green Light	C
8	Tomato	King of Mask Singer Roadblock Mask	D
10	Cycle Rickshaw	Thanh Đa Island	D
All	HaMerotz LaMillion Logo		Treble Clef

=== Leg 12 (New Zealand) ===
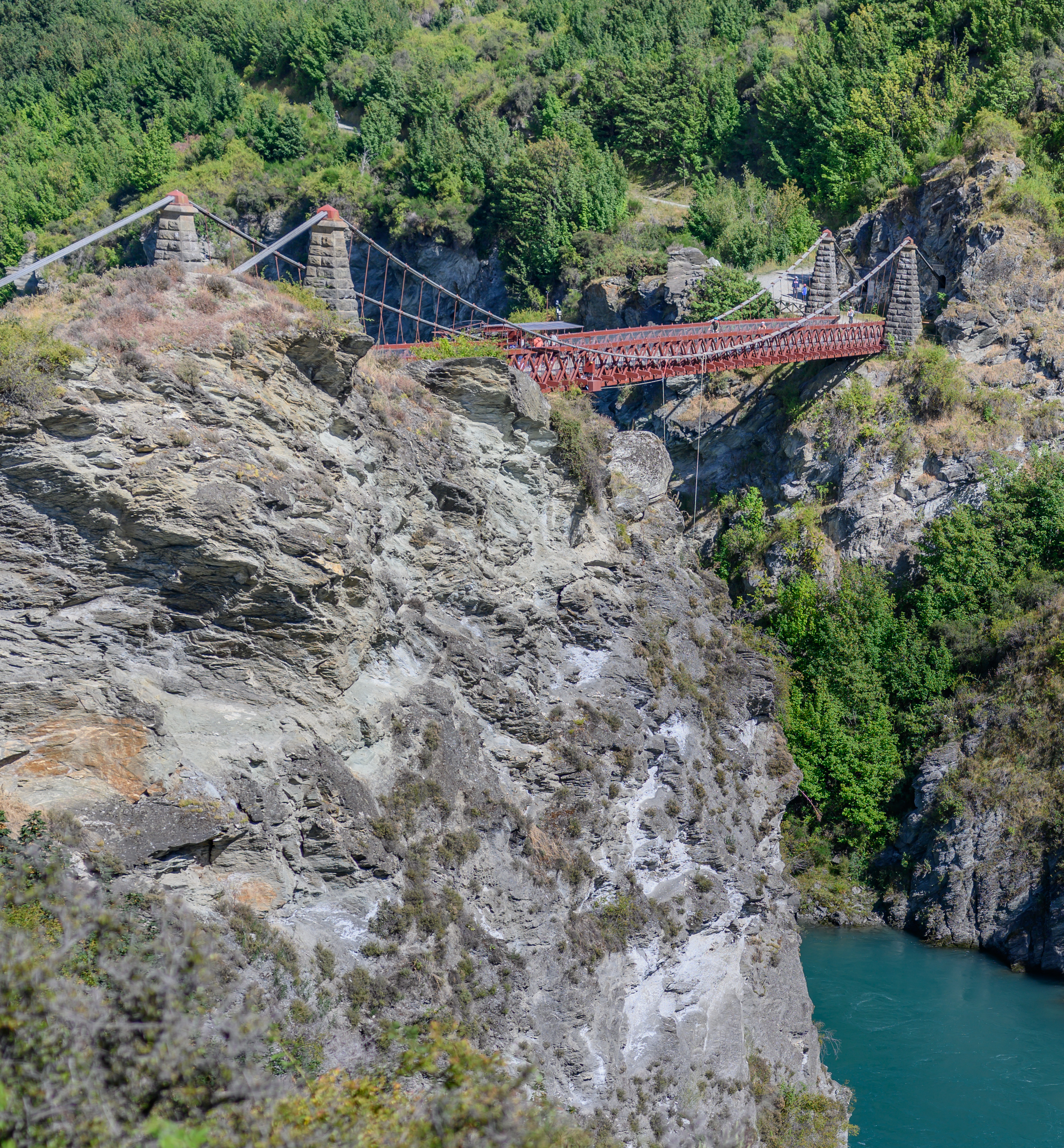
After racing through four continents and twelve countries, teams finished HaMerotz LaMillion 2024 at the Kawarau Gorge Suspension Bridge in Gibbston.

- Airdates: 24 & 25 September 2024
- Prize: ₪1,000,000
- Winners: Lee & Anne
- Runners-up: Inbar & Avishai
- Third place: Lior & Sapir

Locations

- Queenstown (Lake Johnson)
- Queenstown (Canyon Brewing)
- Queenstown (Tussock Point)
- Gibbston (Kawarau Gorge Suspension Bridge)

Episode summary (Episode 38)

- At the start of this leg, teams were instructed by Yehuda to jump from roof to roof across five cars suspended above Lake Johnson until they reached the final one with their next clue.
- Teams then had to drive to Canyon Brewing, listen to a story about the history of the restaurant, and eat two marmite pies before receiving their next clue.

Episode summary (Episode 39)

- After driving to Tussock Point, teams had to answer two questions about the story that they heard. The answer gave them an access code needed to open a gate.
- Once inside, teams had to climb to the top of a 50-meter tower by looping a rope through the side beams and forming a ladder. At the top, one team member had to lean off the tower and grab their final clue while their partner held them back from falling with a support rope.
- After jumping off of the tower, teams had to convince a local to lend them their car, with the owner not allowed to accompany them, and then drive to the finish line: the Kawarau Gorge Suspension Bridge in Gibbston.

Additional note

- Lior & Sapir decided to quit the tower climb task due to Lior experiencing an anxiety attack from acrophobia. Yehuda then came to the task's location and informed them that they had conceded to a third place finish.

== Ratings ==
HaMerotz LaMillion 2024 was the tenth most-watched Israeli program for 2024 with an average viewership of 16.7%. Data courtesy of the Israeli Rating Committee, according to individuals aged 4+ from the general population.

No.	Air date	Episode	Percentage	Nightly Rank	Jewish Household Percentage	Viewers	Ref
1	1 July 2024	"The Premiere Episode"	6.4%	1	15.6%	440,000	
2	2 July 2024	"The Start - The Second Part"	5.4%	1	15.0%	370,000	
3	7 July 2024	"The First Elimination"	5.6%	1	14.0%	383,000	
4	8 July 2024	"Arriving in Spain"	5.4%	1	13.6%	370,000	
5	13 July 2024	"The Battle of Gibraltar"	6.6%	2	15.8%	451,000	
6	16 July 2024	"A Storm in Morocco"	6.6%	1	17.0%	447,000	
7	17 July 2024	"Elimination Episode!"	6.1%	1	16.0%	420,000	
8	20 July 2024	"Crazy Day in the Desert"	5.9%	2	15.2%	403,000	
9	22 July 2024	"Itzik in His Life's Mission"	7.1%	1	17.6%	486,000	
10	23 July 2024	"The Dramatic Night in Marrakesh"	5.9%	1	15.0%	404,000	
11	1 August 2024	"Not Easy at all in Senegal"	5.6%	1	14.0%	384,000	
12	3 August 2024	"The Sweet Revenge"	5.8%	2	14.0%	395,000	
13	5 August 2024	"48 Hours of Drama"	6.1%	2	15.8%	420,000	
14	6 August 2024	"Heartbreaking Elimination"	6.2%	1	15.1%	427,000	
15	10 August 2024	"The Race Has Reopened"	5.4%	2	13.6%	371,000	
16	13 August 2024	"The Fight That Became a Victory"	6.1%	1	15.9%	416,000	
17	17 August 2024	"Upheavals in Azerbaijan"	5.9%	3	14.4%	404,000	
18	19 August 2024	"A Strong Team is Eliminated!"	6.1%	1	16.0%	414,000	
19	20 August 2024	"Landing in Austria"	6.6%	1	17.5%	448,000	
20	22 August 2024	"Love or Rejection?"	5.7%	2	14.5%	387,000	
21	24 August 2024	"Last Minute Elimination"	6.9%	1	17.5%	471,000	
22	26 August 2024	"The Race in Mongolia"	6.2%	1	16.1%	423,000	
23	27 August 2024	"Mongolian Dance"	6.9%	1	17.8%	473,000	
24	31 August 2024	"The Rule-Breaking Elimination"	6.9%	1	16.3%	469,000	
25	2 September 2024	"Landing in Korea!"	6.8%	2	17.0%	466,000	
26	3 September 2024	"The Task That Overwhelms Everyone"	7.1%	1	19.6%	482,000	
27	5 September 2024	"The Teams Are Revealed"	6.3%	1	16.5%	432,000	
28	7 September 2024	"The First Challenge!"	7.5%	1	18.9%	516,000	
29	8 September 2024	"Team Litzik in Seoul"	7.7%	1	18.4%	525,000	
30	10 September 2024	"Esti's Choice"	6.8%	1	16.9%	464,000	
31	11 September 2024	"A Single Task and an Elimination"	7.4%	1	18.6%	504,000	
32	14 September 2024	"The Battle for the Semi-Finals"	7.2%	1	17.2%	489,000	
33	15 September 2024	"The Storm in Vietnam"	6.9%	1	18.5%	469,000	
34	17 September 2024	"The Painful Elimination"	7.2%	2	19.0%	498,000	
35	18 September 2024	"The Battle for a Place in the Finals"	6.2%	2	16.6%	425,000	
36	21 September 2024	"The Fateful Day"	7.2%	2	17.5%	489,000	
37	22 September 2024	"The Last Elimination"	7.9%	1	19.6%	540,000	
38	24 September 2024	"The Final Shock: Part 1"	8.3%	1	20.8%	568,000	
39	25 September 2024	"The Final Shock: Part 2"	9.8%	1	22.3%	672,000	
