= HaMerotz LaMillion =

Israeli adventure reality game show

- Logo from the first season
- Hebrew: המירוץ למיליון
- Genre: Reality competition
- Created by: Elise Doganieri; Bertram van Munster
- Based on: The Amazing Race by: Bertram van Munster; Elise Doganieri
- Presented by: Raz Meirman (2009); Ron Shahar (2011–2020); Yehuda Levi (2024–present)
- Country of origin: Israel
- Original language: Hebrew
- No. of seasons: 10
- No. of episodes: 346

Production
- Executive producers: Michael McKay, Ido Baron
- Producer: David Gardner
- Production location: See below
- Cinematography: Ryan Godard
- Production companies: Reshet (2009–2020) activeTV (2009–2014); Keshet Media Group (2024–present); Baron Productions (2025–present)

Original release
- Network: Channel 2 (Reshet) (2009–2017); Channel 13 (2017–2020); Channel 12 (2024–present)
- Release: 5 February 2009 – present

Related
- International versions

HaMerotz LaMillion (Hebrew: המירוץ למיליון, lit. The Race to the Million) is an Israeli reality competition entertainment show, drawing inspiration from the American series The Amazing Race. Following the premise of other versions in the Amazing Race franchise, the show closely follows the competitive journeys of many couples overcoming challenges and making their way into the final stage of the race, as they often navigating their ways worldwide. Each season is split into legs, with teams tasked to deduce clues, navigate themselves in foreign areas, interact with locals, perform physical and mental challenges, and travel by air, boat, car, taxi, and other modes of transport. Teams are progressively eliminated at the end of most legs for being the last to arrive at designated Pit Stops. The first team to arrive at the Finish Line wins a grand prize of ₪1,000,000.

On 8 April 2008, Israeli TV network Reshet announced plans to produce a local version of the show. It premiered on 5 February 2009, on Channel 2. The show was produced by Reshet and, during its first four seasons, activeTV, which also produced the first four seasons of The Amazing Race Asia and the first two seasons of The Amazing Race Australia, in association with Disney-ABC and ESPN Television. It was originally hosted by Raz Meirman in the first season.

In April 2009, during the airing of the show, Reshet had begun preparations for a second season. They considered producing a celebrity edition of the show that would have raised the price of producing the show. Reshet had consulted with CBS and agreed it would film two more seasons at the same time to save expenses, a celebrity and non-celebrity editions. Despite this, on 20 December, Reshet announced that the show would not continue due to the overall high costs. However, on 20 September 2010, Reshet reconsidered and announced a new season. On 11 February 2011, Ron Shahar was announced as the new host, replacing Raz Meirman.

In October 2021, Shahar stated that a new season would be filmed as soon as it is safely possible due to the COVID-19 pandemic. The show was later cancelled by Reshet in September 2022 in favour of a local version of Peking Express, a similar travel reality competition show. However, in October 2022, it was reported that a new season produced by Keshet Media Group would be filmed in 2023 and aired on Channel 12 in 2024 with Yehuda Levi serving as the new host. Casting for a tenth season opened on 18 July 2024, and the show was officially renewed on 30 October 2024. The show began casting for an eleventh season in December 2025.

== The Race ==
HaMerotz LaMillion is a reality television competition between two teams, in a race worldwide. Each season is divided into a number of legs wherein teams travel and complete various tasks to obtain clues to help them progress to a Pit Stop, where teams are given a chance to rest and recover before starting the next leg. The last team to arrive is normally eliminated (except in non-elimination legs, where the last team to arrive may be penalized in the following leg). The final leg is run by the last three remaining teams, and the first to arrive at the final destination wins ₪1,000,000.

=== Teams ===
Each of the teams is composed of two individuals who have some type of relationship to each other.

=== Route Markers ===
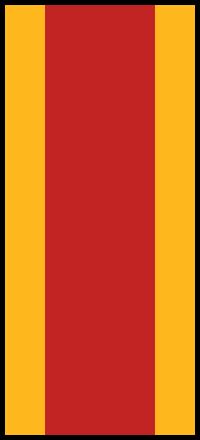

Route Markers are yellow and red flags that mark the places where teams must go. Most Route Markers are attached to the boxes that contain clue envelopes, but some may mark the place where the teams must go in order to complete tasks, or may be used to line a course that the teams must follow. Route markers were, however, colored yellow and white in the third and fourth legs of Season 1, which took place in Vietnam, to avoid confusion with the flag of South Vietnam. During the Vietnamese leg in Season 5, the regular Route Marker was used.

=== Clues ===
Most clues are directly adopted from the original American version:

- Route Info (סימן דרך – Siman Derech): A general clue that may include a task to be completed by the team before they can receive their next clue.
- Detour (צומת – Tzomet ): A choice of two tasks. Teams are free to choose either task and swap tasks if they find one option too difficult.
- Roadblock (מחסום – Machsom ): A task only one team member can complete. Teams must choose which member will complete the task based on a brief clue about the task before fully revealing the details of the task.
- Fast Forward (קיצור דרך – Qitzur Derech ): A task that only one team may complete, allowing that team to skip all remaining tasks and head directly for the next Pit Stop. Teams may only claim one Fast Forward.
- Duel (דו־קרב – Du-Qrav ): Introduced in Season 2, it is a task where two teams must compete against each other. In the Duel, the first team to arrive must wait for another team to perform a task. The team that wins the Duel will receive the next clue while the losing team would have to wait for the next team to redo the task. The cycle repeats until the last remaining team would have to wait out a penalty.

=== Obstacles ===
In addition to performing tasks, teams may encounter the following that could potentially slow them down:

- Yield (עצור – Atzor ): It is where a team is forced to wait a pre-determined amount of time before continuing racing.
- U-Turn (סיבוב פרסה – Sibuv Parsa ): It is where a team is forced to return and complete the other option of the Detour they did not choose.

In Season 1, the Yield and U-Turn rules were similar to the original rules in the American version; The Yield and U-Turn only appeared sporadically and a single team can utilize their power to Yield/U-Turn another team at the Yield/U-Turn board only once.

In Season 2, a new rule regarding the Yield and U-turn was introduced. The Yield and U-Turn now appeared more often (almost every leg) and instead of a single team using their power to affect another team, all teams are now required to vote for the team they wish to Yield or U-turn (depending on the leg). Sometime during the leg, teams will encounter a board with their pictures. Here, they could choose from photographs of the teams and place the one they want to Yield/U-Turn below their pictures faced backwards. Sometime later in the leg, they would encounter another board where they would have to pull down their pictures on the board to reveal if they have been Yielded or U-Turned. The team/s with the most votes will receive the penalty. Teams that pull down their picture and get a red will get the penalty and the pictures of the teams that Yielded/U-Turned them. Those that get a green are free to continue racing.

In Season 3, the Double U-Turn was introduced. In addition to the rules above, the team that gets U-Turned is free to U-Turn another team of their choosing.

- Intersection (מסלול משותף – Maslul Meshutaf ): Introduced in Season 3, two teams have to team up and complete further tasks together until they are informed that they are no longer Intersected. Teams are free to choose which team they want to partner with.

=== Legs ===
At the beginning of each leg, teams receive an allowance of cash to cover expenses during the legs (except for the purchase of airline tickets, which are paid-for by provided credit cards).

Teams then have to follow clues and Route Markers that will lead them to the various destinations and tasks they will face. Modes of travel between these destinations include commercial and chartered airplanes, boats, trains, taxis, buses, and rented vehicles provided by the show, or the teams may simply travel by foot. Each leg ends with a twelve-hour Pit Stop where teams are able to rest and where teams that arrive last are progressively eliminated until only three teams remain..

Differing from most of the other franchises of the series, the season finale is filmed as the program is being broadcast.

- The Salvage Pass was awarded to the winners of the first leg of Season 3. This allowed that team to either save the last team to arrive on that leg from elimination or gain a lead in the next leg.
- The Return Ticket was awarded to the team that finished first during a leg that consisted of previously eliminated teams in Season 6. This allowed the team that won it to return to the competition.

==== Non-elimination legs ====
Each season has a number of pre-determined non-elimination legs, in which the last team to arrive at the Pit Stop is not eliminated and is allowed to continue. There is no single elimination penalty in this version of the show:

- Season 1
  - In the first leg, the team was forced to relinquish all of their money and belongings (except for passports and the clothes on their back) for the remainder of the season. In addition, they were not allotted money for the next leg and were not allowed to collect money until the next leg started for them.
  - In the seventh leg, the team was "Marked for Elimination"; if the team did not place first in the next leg, they would receive a 30-minute penalty.
- Season 2
  - In the fourth and eleventh legs, the team had to perform a Speed Bump (פס האטה – Pas Heatah), a task only they must complete in the next leg.
  - In the sixth and ninth legs, the team was "Marked for Elimination"; if the team did not place first in the next leg, they would receive a 1-hour (leg 6) or 30-minute (leg 9) penalty.
- Season 3
  - In the fifth leg, the team was required to wear their winter clothing for the duration of the next leg in the heat of Brazil.
  - In the seventh leg, the team that came last would have to wait an extra 30 minutes before departing on the next leg.
- From Season 4 to Season 6 and in Season 8, no penalty was given to the affected team.
- Season 7
  - In the first leg, the team would be on a flight that arrived two hours after the other teams landed in their first destination.
- Season 9
  - The eighth leg featured a non-elimination leg that combined a no-rest leg with a Partner Swap (חילופי זוגות – Hilufey Zugot).

=== Rules and penalties ===
Most of the rules and penalties are adopted directly from the American edition, but in some cases, this version has been seen to have a unique set of additional rules.

== Seasons ==
Season	Broadcast		Winners	Teams	Host
Season	Premiere date	Finale date	Winners	Teams	Host
Channel 2 & 13 Iteration (2009–2020)
1	5 February 2009	11 June 2009	Guy Osadon & Shay Kahana	10	Raz Meirman
2	25 October 2011	11 February 2012	Bar Ben-Vakil & Inna Broder	11	Ron Shahar
3	11 May 2013	31 August 2013	Talia Gorodess & Koby Windzberg	11	Ron Shahar
4	22 November 2014	28 March 2015	Shay Gavriel & Shani Alon	14	Ron Shahar
5	17 May 2016	26 September 2016	Amit & Raz Gal	14	Ron Shahar
6	21 October 2017	17 March 2018	Evelin & Tohar Haimovich	12	Ron Shahar
7	15 July 2019	22 September 2019	Matija "Tia" Galili & Fatima "Fay" Jakite	12	Ron Shahar
8	6 September 2020	8 December 2020	Yael Carmon & Yosiel Neeman	12	Ron Shahar
Channel 12 Iteration (2024–present)
9	1 July 2024	25 September 2024	Lee & Anne Avrahami	13	Yehuda Levi
10	24 January 2026	10 May 2026	Tom Shelach & Almog Ohayon	14	Yehuda Levi

== Countries and locales visited ==
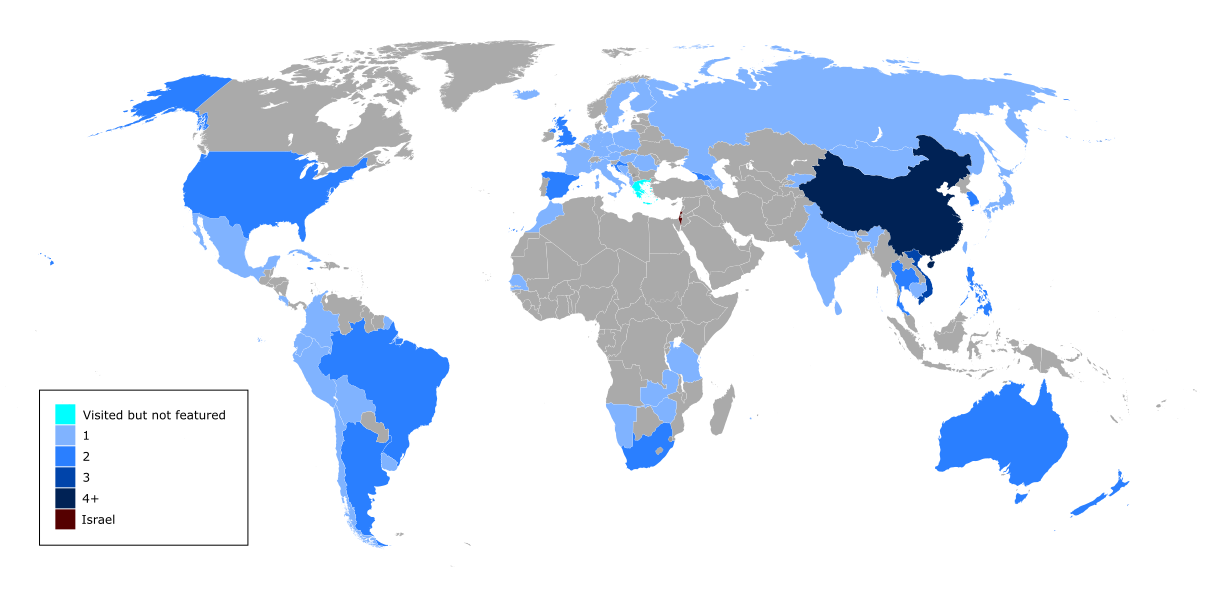
Countries that HaMerotz LaMillion has visited are shown in color.

As of 2026, HaMerotz LaMillion has visited 61 countries, one territory and six continents.

=== Asia ===
Rank	Country	Seasons visited	Pit Stops
1	Israel	8 (1–8)	11^{6}
2	China^{1}	4 (1, 2, 7, 10)	7
3	Vietnam	3 (1, 5, 9)	4
4	Georgia^{2}	2 (4, 10)	4
4	Philippines	2 (7, 8)	3
4	South Korea	2 (5, 9)	3
4	Thailand	2 (2, 6)	4
8	Armenia^{2}	1 (8)	2
8	Azerbaijan^{2}	1 (9)	1
8	Cambodia	1 (5)	1
8	India	1 (5)	1
8	Japan	1 (1)	1
8	Kyrgyzstan	1 (6)	2
8	Mongolia	1 (9)	1
8	Nepal	1 (7)	2
8	Singapore	1 (2)	2^{5}
8	Sri Lanka	1 (2)	2
8	Taiwan	1 (3)	2^{5}

=== North America ===
Rank	Country	Seasons visited	Pit Stops
1	Jamaica	2 (6, 10)	2
1	United States	2 (3, 6)	5
3	Costa Rica	1 (4)	2
3	Cuba	1 (3)	2
3	Mexico	1 (6)	2

=== South America ===
Rank	Country	Seasons visited	Pit Stops
1	Argentina	2 (4, 10)	3^{7}
1	Brazil	2 (3, 8)	4
2	Bolivia	1 (4)	2
2	Chile	1 (8)	2
2	Colombia	1 (6)	1
2	Ecuador	1 (8)	2
2	Peru	1 (10)	2
2	Uruguay	1 (10)	1

=== Europe ===
Rank	Country/Territory	Seasons visited	Pit Stops
1	Croatia	2 (2, 10)	2
1	Spain	2 (3, 9)	2
1	United Kingdom^{3}	2 (4, 9)	1
4	Albania	1 (10)	1
4	Austria	1 (9)	0
4	Bosnia and Herzegovina	1 (2)	0
4	Czech Republic	1 (2)	1
4	Finland	1 (4)	2
4	France	1 (3)	1
4	Germany	1 (9)	1
4	Gibraltar	1 (9)	0
4	Greece^{4}	1 (6)	0
4	Hungary	1 (2)	2
4	Iceland	1 (9)	1
4	Italy	1 (5)	2
4	Montenegro	1 (10)	1
4	Netherlands	1 (8)	1
4	Poland	1 (2)	1
4	Romania	1 (5)	1
4	Russia	1 (6)	1
4	Sweden	1 (4)	1

=== Africa ===
Rank	Country	Seasons visited	Pit Stops
1	South Africa	2 (1, 7)	4
2	Mauritius	1 (7)	2
2	Morocco	1 (9)	2
2	Namibia	1 (5)	2
2	Senegal	1 (9)	1
2	Tanzania	1 (5)	1
2	Zambia	1 (7)	1
2	Zimbabwe	1 (7)	1

=== Oceania ===
Rank	Country	Seasons visited	Pit Stops
1	Australia	2 (1, 5)	3^{5}
1	New Zealand	2 (1, 9)	4^{7}

== Notes ==
1. Including the Special Administrative Regions of Hong Kong and Macau (1 & 10).
2. Armenia, Azerbaijan, and Georgia are geographically located in both Europe and Asia, but they are officially counted as in Asia.
3. Including the constituent country of England (4) and the overseas territory of Gibraltar (9).
4. For one episode, 5 of the 8 first eliminated teams of Season 6 took part in a special separate leg of reward competitions taking place in Greece.
5. Includes 1 Finish Line.
6. Includes 3 Finish Lines.
7. Includes 2 Finish Lines.
