= Equestrian statue of Genghis Khan =

Monument in Ulaanbaatar, Mongolia

Genghis Khan Equestrian Statue
- Чингис хааны морьт хөшөө
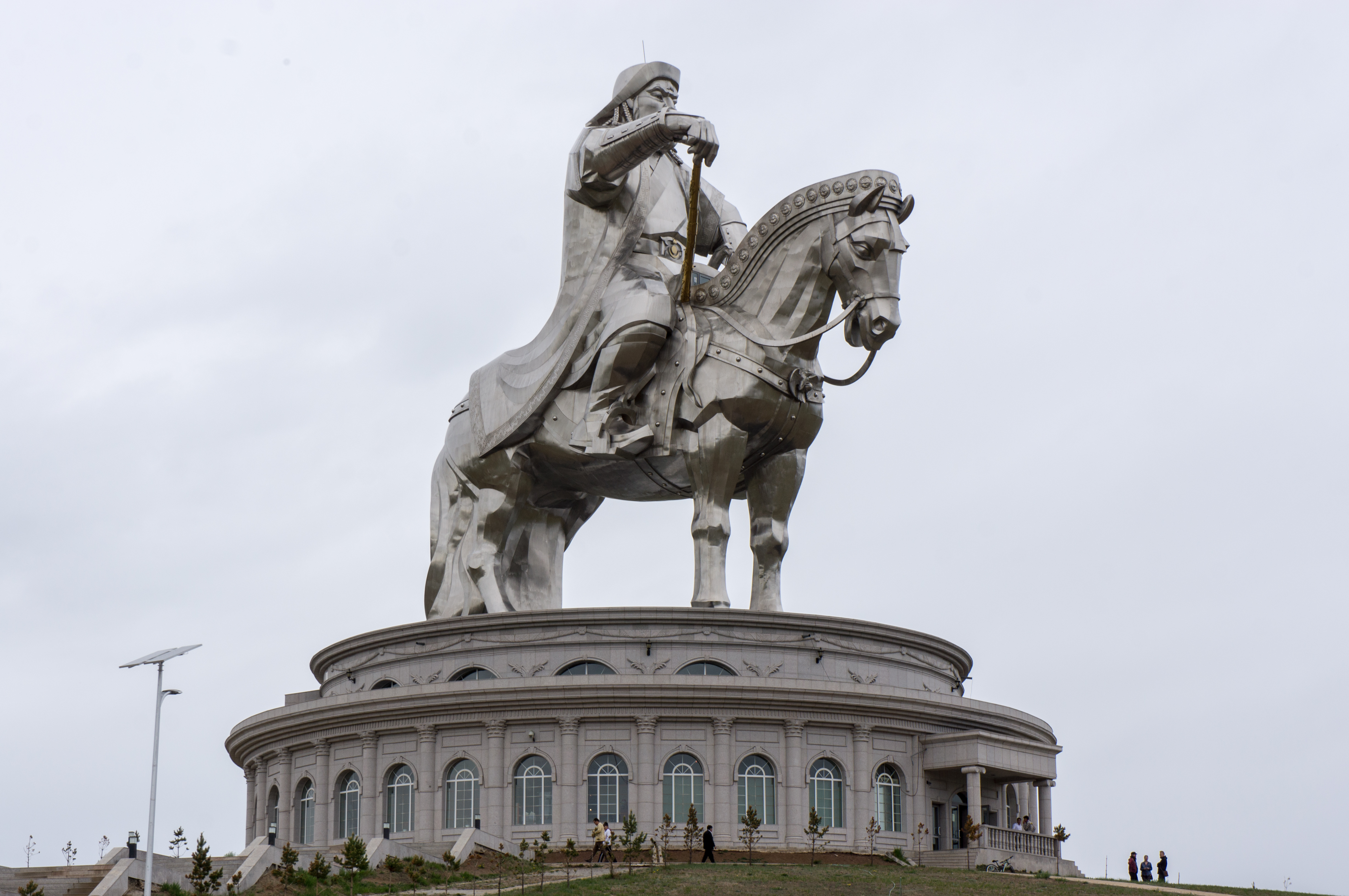
- Interactive map of Genghis Khan Equestrian Statue
- Location: Nalaikh, Ulaanbaatar, Mongolia
- Coordinates: 47°48′29.00″N 107°31′47.10″E
- Designer: D. Erdembileg (sculptor); J. Enkhjargal (architect)
- Type: Equestrian statue
- Material: Stainless steel
- Height: 40 metres (130 ft)
- Completion date: 2008
- Dedicated to: Genghis Khan

The Genghis Khan Equestrian Statue, part of the Genghis Khan Statue Complex, is a 40-metre (130 ft) tall, stainless steel statue of Genghis Khan on horseback and the world's tallest equestrian statue. It is located about a mile from the Tuul River at Tsonjin Boldog, 54 km (33.55 mi) east of the Mongolian capital Ulaanbaatar, where, according to legend, he found a golden whip. The statue is symbolically pointed east toward his birthplace. It is on top of the Genghis Khan Statue Complex, a visitor centre, itself 10 metres (33 ft) tall, with 36 columns representing the 36 khans from Genghis to Ligdan Khan. Visitors can walk into the head of the horse through its chest and neck, where they have a panoramic view.

The complex designed by sculptor D. Erdenebileg and architect J. Enkhjargal and erected and opened in 2008 to honor the 800th anniversary of the founding of the Mongol Empire. The cost of the complex was reported to be US$4.1 million, and it was built by the Genco Tourism Bureau, a Mongolian company. The company is associated with Khaltmaagiin Battulga, who later served as President of Mongolia from 2017 to 2021.

== See also ==
- List of tallest statues
