= Platzl =

Square in Munich, Bavaria, Germany

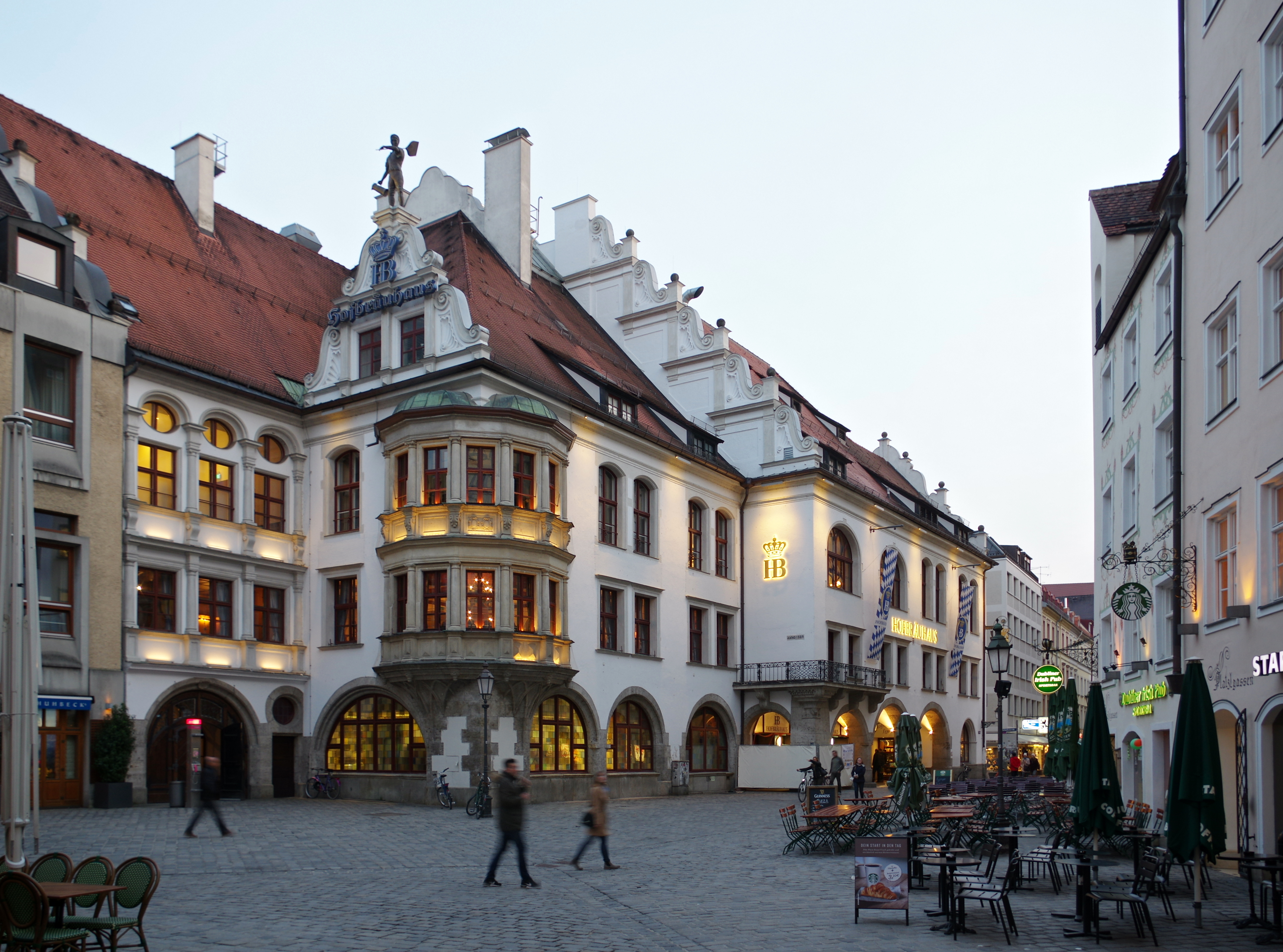
- Platzl with view of the Hofbräuhaus
- Type: square
- Coordinates: 48°8′17″N 11°34′48″E

The Platzl is a public square in Munich, Germany, at which multiple notable buildings reside or resided, such as the Theater am Platzl and the Hofbräuhaus am Platzl.

The square was first mentioned on maps by its current name in 1780; previously, it was known only as the "Graggenau" quarter. In the nineteenth century, first the white beer and then the brown beer brewing operations of the Hofbräuhaus brewery were moved to the Platzl. With the later addition of the "Bockbierkeller", the Platzl became the center of Munich beer drinkers.

In 1874, a theater-restaurant moved in across the Hofbräuhaus am Platzl which by 1906 became known as the "Platzl Bühne" ("Stage at the Platzl") theater, marking the beginning of the Platzl as one of Munich's entertainment districts.
