= Shepherd's Shemozzle =

New Zealand obstacle course activity, often involving a dog

Characteristics
- Venue: Obstacle course

Presence
- Country or region: New Zealand

Shepherd's Shemozzle (also called Shemozzle Race or simply Shemozzle) is a New Zealand obstacle course activity involving dogs.

Shepherd's Shemozzle is the trademark race of the Hunterville Huntaway Festival, Rangitikei's signature event. In 2023, 625 people competed, and between 3,000 and 5,000 people attended the event.

The race involves shepherds and their Huntaway dogs competing through multiple challenges. Each year the obstacles are a secret until the festival begins, but challenges in the past have included swinging on ropes, climbing through tunnels, sliding down mudslides, racing through streets, climbing the "gutbuster hill", and eating disgusting foods. The winner of the event receives NZD$1,000 in cash among other prizes. Less physically demanding versions of the event exist for children, teenagers, and families.

The event has piqued interest in foreign audiences, having been featured on Japanese television as well as the American reality television series The Amazing Race.
