= Lake Johnson =

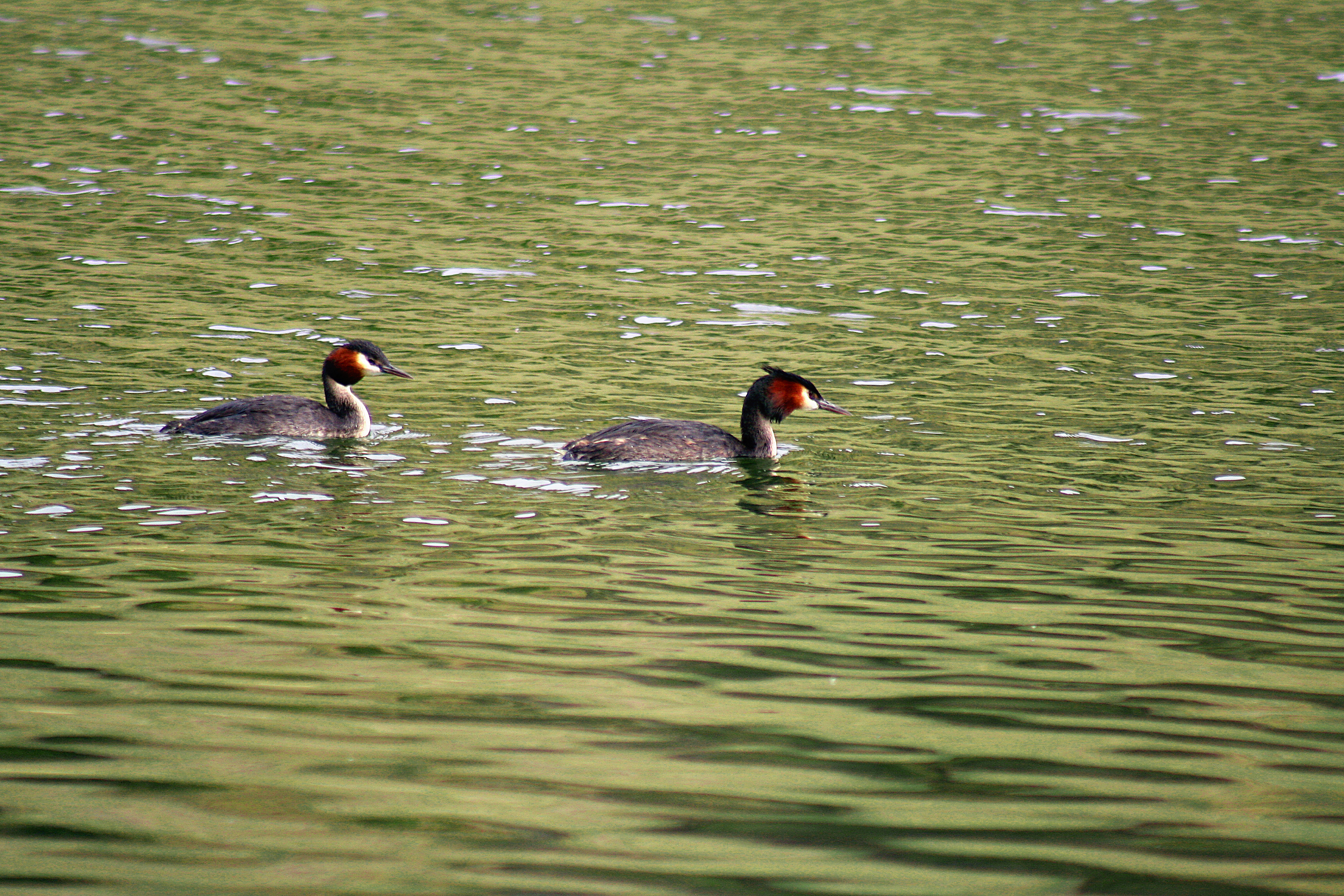
- Australasian Crested Grebes on Lake Johnson

- Location within South Island
- Location: Queenstown, South Island
- Coordinates: 45°0′12.43″S 168°43′54.92″E
- Lake type: Glacial lake
- Catchment area: 1.9 km^{2} (0.73 sq mi)
- Basin countries: New Zealand
- Surface area: 0.2 km^{2} (0.077 sq mi)
- Average depth: 27 m (89 ft)

Lake Johnson is a small lake near the suburb of Frankton in Queenstown in the South Island of New Zealand. It has no inflow or outflow and is classified as a glacial lake.
