= HaMerotz LaMillion 10 =

Season of television series

- Season 10
- Presented by: Yehuda Levi
- No. of days: 30
- No. of teams: 14
- Winners: Tom Shelach and Almog Ohayon
- Distance traveled: 47,230 km (29,350 mi)
- No. of episodes: 40 (41 including recap)

Release
- Original network: Channel 12
- Original release: 24 January – 10 May 2026

Additional information
- Filming dates: 4 May – 2 June 2025

Series chronology
- ← Previous; Season 9 Next → Season 11

HaMerotz LaMillion 10, also known as HaMerotz LaMillion 2026, is the tenth season of HaMerotz LaMillion (Hebrew: המירוץ למיליון, lit. The Race to the Million), an Israeli reality competition show based on the American series The Amazing Race, and the second installment of Channel 12's iteration of the show. Hosted by Yehuda Levi, it featured fourteen teams of two, each with a pre-existing relationship, in a race around the world to win ₪1,000,000. This season visited four continents and nine countries, traveling approximately 47,230 kilometres (29,350 mi) over eleven legs. Starting in Lovćen National Park or Dajti Mountain National Park, racers traveled through Montenegro, Albania, Croatia, Hong Kong, Macau, Georgia, Jamaica, Peru, Uruguay, and Argentina, before finishing in Tigre. Elements of the show that returned for this season include the split Starting Lines during the first leg. The season premiered on Channel 12 on 24 January 2026 and concluded on 10 May 2026. A special reunion episode aired on 13 May 2026.

Friends and footballers Tom Shelach and Almog Ohayon were the winners of this season, while married parents Adi Atzmi and Or Ohana finished in second place, and father and daughter Ezi and Dani Buhbut finished in third place.

== Production ==
=== Development and filming ===
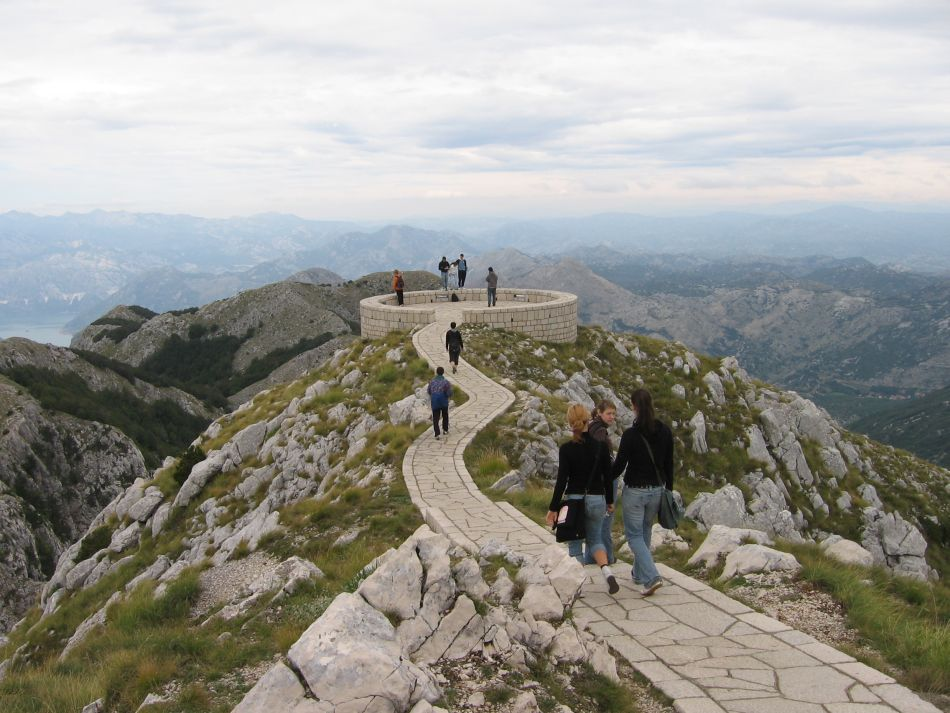

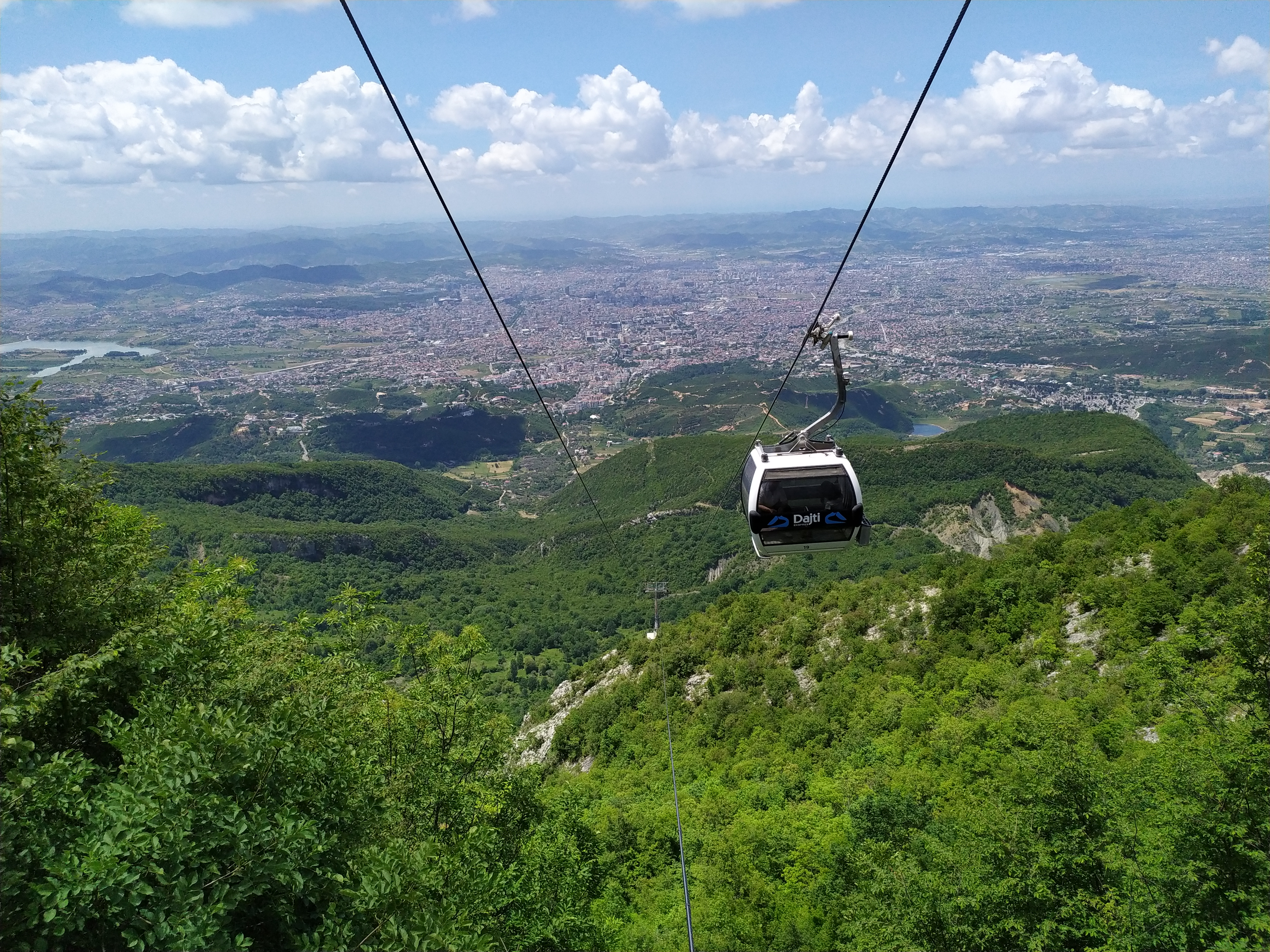
Teams began HaMerotz LaMillion 2026 atop either Mount Lovćen in Montenegro or Mount Dajti in Albania.

Keshet Media Group renewed HaMerotz LaMillion for a second season on Channel 12 on 30 October 2024.

Filming for this season began in May 2025, and concluded in early June. This season featured the return of two Starting Lines during the first leg for the first time since the fifth season, where two groups of seven teams began the race from two different locations. This season also includes first-time visits to Montenegro and Albania, countries which have never been featured in any version of The Amazing Race, along with first-time visits to Peru and Uruguay.

=== Casting ===
Casting for this season began on 18 July 2024 while the previous season was still airing and prior to the show's renewal. By the end of October, 14,000 couples had applied for the show with auditions beginning in December. The first phase of casting concluded in late February 2025. Olympic bronze medalist Ariel Ze'evi was contacted to compete with his daughter Noam; however, production rescinded the offer after learning that Noam was not 18 years old.

== Release ==
=== Broadcast ===
In December 2025, it was revealed to advertisers that the season would be broadcast in 2026. On 8 January 2026, reports emerged of a potential 24 January premiere date. The first trailer for this season was released on 12 January 2026. On 17 January 2026, the premiere date was announced to be 24 January.

=== Marketing ===
Sponsors for this season include Harel Group, Hoka, Cal, Osem, La Roche-Posay, Elite Turkish Coffee, Doritos, Müller, Twentyfourseven, Samsung, and the Georgian National Tourism Administration.

== Cast ==
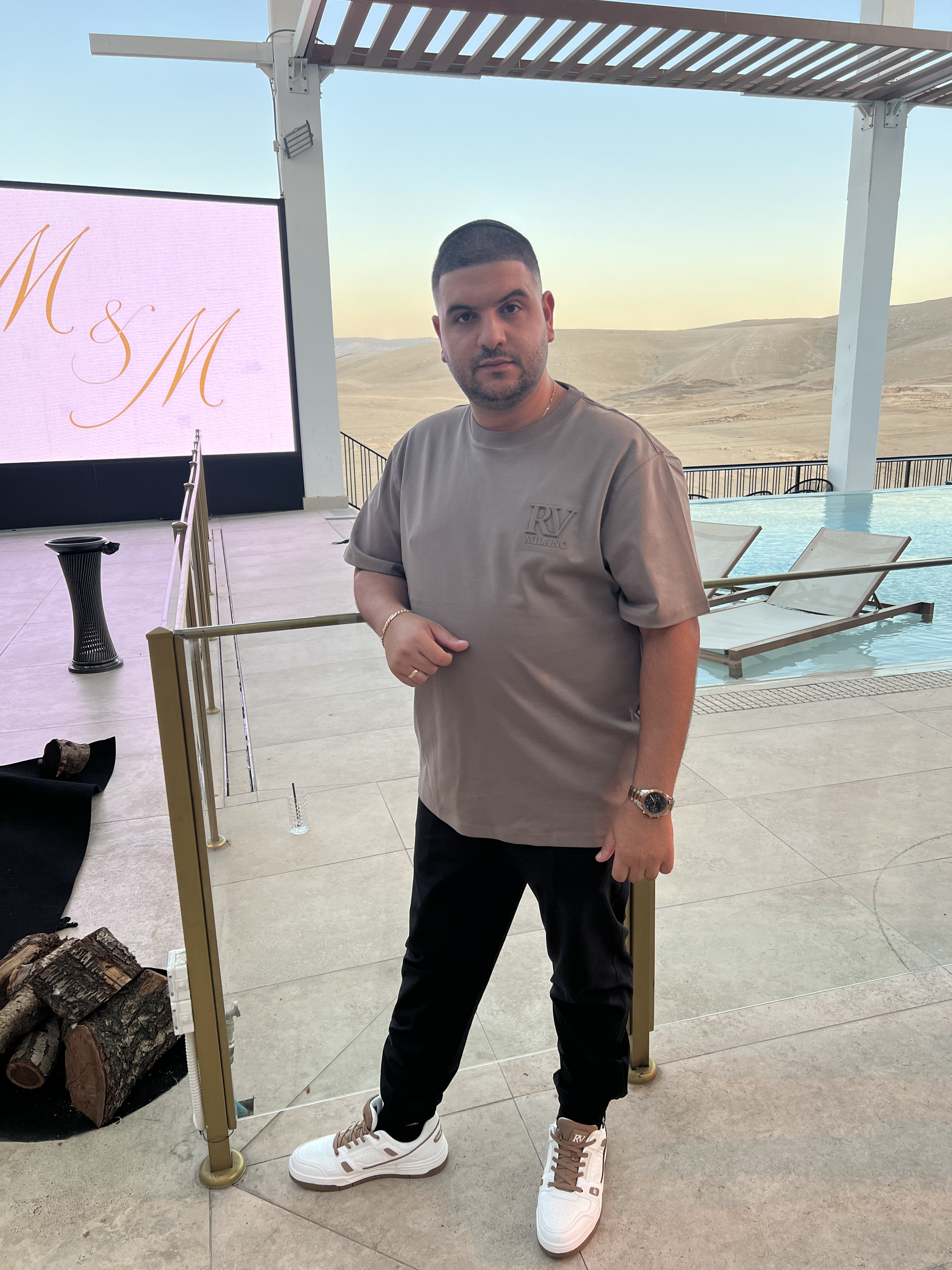
Shlomi Ifrah

The full cast was revealed on 20 January 2026 during the finale of Rising Star.

Contestants	Age	Relationship	Hometown	Status
Reuven Lavi (ראובן לביא)	59	Father & Daughter	Tel Aviv	Eliminated 1st (in Podgorica, Montenegro)
Gali Lavi (גלי לביא)	24	Father & Daughter	Tel Aviv	Eliminated 1st (in Podgorica, Montenegro)
Yotam Ohayon (יותם אוחיון)	30	Friends/Lawyers	Be'er Sheva	Eliminated 2nd (in Lezhë, Albania)
Nofar Zommer (נופר זומר)	30	Friends/Lawyers	Giv'atayim	Eliminated 2nd (in Lezhë, Albania)
Emuna Zingboim (אמונה זינגבוים)	25	Siblings	Ra'anana	Eliminated 3rd (in Komolac, Croatia)
Nerya Zingboim (נריה זינגבוים)	27	Siblings	Ra'anana	Eliminated 3rd (in Komolac, Croatia)
Ron Horwitz (רון הורביץ)	24	Engaged	Petah Tikva	Eliminated 4th (in Hong Kong)
Meitav Ziv (מיטב זיו)	26	Engaged	Giv'at Shmuel	Eliminated 4th (in Hong Kong)
Michal Pras (מיכל פרס)	29	Best Friends/Models	Ramat Ef'al	Eliminated 5th (in Macau)
Nooni Keren (נוני קרן)	27	Best Friends/Models	Tel Aviv	Eliminated 5th (in Macau)
Chen Drix (חן דריקס)	37	Married at First Sight Exes	Neve Yarak	Withdrew (in Tbilisi, Georgia)
Yossi Ezra (יוסי עזרא)	37	Married at First Sight Exes	Rishon LeZion	Withdrew (in Tbilisi, Georgia)
Tom Boukai (תום בוקאי)	32	Married Parents	Herzliya	Eliminated 6th (in Tbilisi, Georgia)
Samantha Pacino (סמנטה פצינו)	32	Married Parents	Herzliya	Eliminated 6th (in Tbilisi, Georgia)
Itay Rozenblit (איתי רוזנבליט)	21	Brothers	Ramat HaSharon	Eliminated 7th (in Tbilisi, Georgia)
Omri Rozenblit (עמרי רוזנבליט)	24	Brothers	Ramat HaSharon	Eliminated 7th (in Tbilisi, Georgia)
Sapir Harush (ספיר הרוש)	30	Best Friends	Jerusalem	Eliminated 8th (in Lima, Peru)
Sapir Tsemah (ספיר צמח)	30	Best Friends	Jerusalem	Eliminated 8th (in Lima, Peru)
Mai Hatuel (מאי חטואל)	32	Childhood Friends	Herut	Eliminated 9th (in Lima, Peru)
Itay Aon (איתי און)	32	Childhood Friends	Herut	Eliminated 9th (in Lima, Peru)
Shlomi Ifrah (שלומי יפרח)	28	Friends/Actors	Ashdod	Eliminated 10th (in Montevideo, Uruguay)
Asaf Zaga (אסף זגה)	28	Friends/Actors	Be'er Sheva	Eliminated 10th (in Montevideo, Uruguay)
Eliezer "Ezi" Buhbut (אזי בוחבוט)	56	Father & Daughter	Kfar HaOranim	Third place
Danielle "Dani" Buhbut (דני בוחבוט)	26	Father & Daughter	Kfar HaOranim	Third place
Adi Atzmi (עדי עצמי)	38	Married Parents	Ramat Gan	Runners-up
Or Ohana (אור אוחנה)	38	Married Parents	Ramat Gan	Runners-up
Tom Shelach (טום שלח)	28	Friends/Footballers	Tel Aviv	Winners
Almog Ohayon (אלמוג אוחיון)	30	Friends/Footballers	Nahariya	Winners

== Results ==
The following teams are listed with their placements in each leg. Placements are listed in finishing order.

- A red placement with a dagger (†) indicates that the team was eliminated.
- An underlined blue placement with a double-dagger (‡) indicates that the team was the last to arrive at a Pit Stop in a non-elimination leg.
- A green ƒ indicates that the team won the Fast Forward.
- A brown ⊂ indicates the team who received a U-Turn; ⊃ indicates that the team voted for the recipient.
- A gold < or orange « indicates the team who received a Yield; > or » indicates that the team voted for the recipient.
- An orange + indicates that there was a Duel on this leg, while an orange − indicates the team that lost the final Duel and received a 15-minute penalty.

Team placement (by leg)
Team	1 (Note: Leg 1 was split into two halves. Seven of the teams completed the first part of the leg in Montenegro, while the other seven completed the second part in Albania.)		2+	3	4+	5	6	7	8+	9+	10	11+
Tom & Almog	5th⊃		7th»	9th	2nd>	7th	6th>	1st⊃	1st	1st	2nd	1st−
Adi & Or		6th⊂	8th^{<}_{»}	3rd<	4th	6th	4th	5th	2nd	4th	3rd	2nd
Ezi & Dani		4th⊃	5th«	8th	7th>	3rd	5th<	6th‡⊂	4th−	2nd	1st	3rd
Shlomi & Asaf		3rd	11th	5th	1st	1st	1stƒ	4th	3rd	3rd	4th†	
Mai & Itay	3rd⊂		4th>	4th>	3rd	2nd	2nd	2nd⊃	5th	5th†		
Sapir & Sapir	4th⊃		9th»	7th	6th>−	5th	3rd>	3rd⊃	6th†			
Itay & Omri		1st	1st	1st	5th>	4th	7th†					
Tom & Samantha	2nd		3rd>	2nd>	9th	8th†						
Chen & Yossi	6th		6th»	6th	8th>	† (Note: Chen & Yossi decided to withdraw from the leg due to Chen's illness. After traveling to the first task's location and with no improvement of Chen's condition, they were then driven to the Pit Stop for their elimination.)						
Michal & Nooni		2nd	10th	10th	10th†<							
Ron & Meitav	1st		2nd>	11th†>								
Emuna & Nerya		5th⊃	12th†>−									
Yotam & Nofar		7th†⊃										
Reuven & Gali	7th†⊃											

=== Voting history ===
Teams may vote to choose either U-Turn or Yield. The team with the most votes received the U-Turn or Yield penalty, depending on the respective leg.

	U-Turn		Yield					U-Turn
Leg #	1A	1B	2	3	4	5	6	7
U-Turned/Yielded	Mai & Itay	Adi & Or	Adi & Or; Ezi & Dani	Adi & Or	Michal & Nooni	Unaired	Ezi & Dani	Ezi & Dani
Result	3–2–1–1	3–1–1–1–1	4–4–1–1–1–1	3–2–2–2–1–1	5–2–1–1–1	Unaired	2–1–1–1–1	3–2–1
Voter	Team's Vote							
Tom & Almog	Mai & Itay		Ezi & Dani	Michal & Nooni	Michal & Nooni	Unknown	Ezi & Dani	Ezi & Dani
Adi & Or		Ezi & Dani	Ezi & Dani	Mai & Itay	Mai & Itay	Unknown	Mai & Itay	Mai & Itay
Ezi & Dani		Adi & Or	Ron & Meitav	Chen & Yossi	Sapir & Sapir	Unknown	Sapir & Sapir	Adi & Or
Shlomi & Asaf		Michal & Nooni	Sapir & Sapir	Chen & Yossi	Michal & Nooni	Unknown	—N/a	Mai & Itay
Mai & Itay	Reuven & Gali		Adi & Or	Adi & Or	Adi & Or	Unknown	Adi & Or	Ezi & Dani
Sapir & Sapir	Mai & Itay		Ezi & Dani	Ezi & Dani	Michal & Nooni	Unknown	Ezi & Dani	Ezi & Dani
Itay & Omri		Emuna & Nerya	Michal & Nooni	Michal & Nooni	Michal & Nooni	Unknown	Tom & Almog	
Tom & Samantha	Reuven & Gali		Adi & Or	Adi & Or	Adi & Or	Unknown		
Chen & Yossi	Ron & Meitav		Ezi & Dani	Ezi & Dani	Michal & Nooni			
Michal & Nooni		Itay & Omri	Tom & Almog	Tom & Almog	Tom & Almog			
Ron & Meitav	Tom & Samantha		Adi & Or	Adi & Or				
Emuna & Nerya		Adi & Or	Adi & Or					
Yotam & Nofar		Adi & Or						
Reuven & Gali	Mai & Itay							

== Episode Titles ==
Translated from Hebrew from the official website:

1. Premiere Episode! (פרק הבכורה!) (Leg 1)
2. Storm in Montenegro (סערה במונטנגרו) (Leg 1)
3. The First Elimination (ההדחה הראשונה) (Leg 1)
4. The Second Launch (ההזנקה השנייה) (Leg 1)
5. Omri's Test (המבחן של עמרי) (Leg 1)
6. Drama at the End (דרמה בנקודת הסיום) (Leg 1)
7. The Teams Unite (הקבוצות מתאחדות) (Leg 2)
8. Meitav and Ron's Crisis (המשבר של מיטב ורון) (Leg 2)
9. The Brilliant Move (המהלך המבריק) (Leg 2)
10. Shlomi Breaks Down (שלומי נשבר) (Leg 2)
11. Typhoon in Hong Kong (טייפון בהונג קונג) (Leg 3)
12. Mai & Itay's Breakup (מאי ואיתי ההתפרקות) (Leg 3)
13. Or & Adi's Move (המהלך של אור ועדי) (Leg 3)
14. A Revolution in the Elimination (מהפכה בהדחה) (Leg 3)
15. Landing in Macau (נוחתים במקאו) (Leg 4)
16. Civil War in Macau (מלחמת אחים במקאו) (Leg 4)
17. The Cards Are Being Dealt in Macau (הקלפים נטרפים במקאו) (Leg 4)
18. The Elimination Wheel (גלגל ההדחה) (Leg 4)
19. The Drama in Georgia (הדרמה בגאורגיה) (Leg 5)
20. The Day That Got Out of Control (היום שיצא משליטה) (Leg 5)
21. An Unusual Night in Georgia (לילה חריג בגאורגיה) (Leg 5)
22. The Painful Elimination (ההדחה הכואבת) (Leg 5)
23. The Race Goes Back in Time (המירוץ חוזר בזמן) (Leg 6)
24. Fates Are Decided in an Instant (גורלות נחרצים ברגע) (Leg 6)
25. The Impossible Elimination (ההדחה הבלתי אפשרית) (Leg 6)
26. The Jamaican Turnaround (התפנית הג'מייקנית) (Leg 7)
27. Father's Test (המבחן של אבא) (Leg 7)
28. The Best-Kept Secret is Revealed (הסוד השמור נחשף) (Leg 7)
29. The Wild Relationship Test (מבחן הזוגיות הפרוע) (Leg 8)
30. A Day Without Air in Peru (יום בלי אוויר בפרו) (Leg 8)
31. Meeting at the Top of the Stairs (מפגש בקצה המדרגות) (Leg 8)
32. Quarter-Final Elimination (הדחת רבע הגמר) (Leg 8)
33. The Teams Mix (הזוגות מתערבבים) (Leg 9)
34. Or's Choice (הבחירה של אור) (Leg 9)
35. Semi-Final Elimination (הדחת חצי הגמר) (Leg 9)
36. Drama in the Semi-Finals (דרמה בחצי הגמר) (Leg 10)
37. Friendship on Trial (חברות במבחן) (Leg 10)
38. The Final Three are Revealed (שלישיית הגמר נחשפת) (Leg 10)
39. The Tearful Finale (גמר הדמעות) (Leg 11)
40. The Finale! (הגמר!) (Leg 11)
41. Pit Stop (נקודת סיום) (Recap)

== Race summary ==
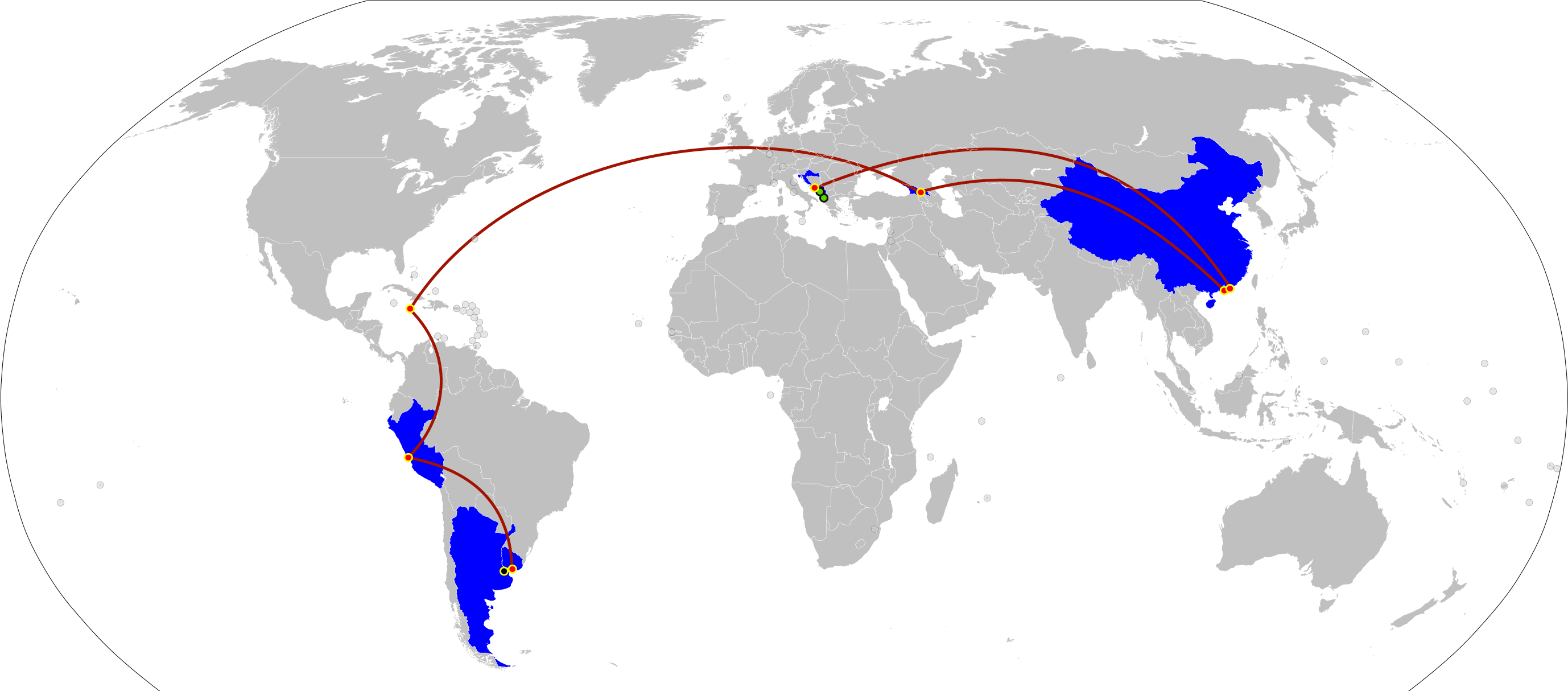
The route map of HaMerotz LaMillion 10.

Destinations	Air travel Rail travel Water travel Bus travel Helicopter travel Bicycle travel Gondola travel
Route Markers	צומת (Detour) מחסום (Roadblock) קיצור דרך (Fast Forward) דו–קרב (Duel) פרסה (U-Turn) עצור (Yield) חילופי זוגות (Partner Swap) נקודת סיום (Pit Stop)

=== Leg 1 (Montenegro & Albania) ===
Seven teams concluded their race through Montenegro outside the Cathedral of the Resurrection of Christ.

Group A

- Airdates: 24, 27 & 31 January 2026
- Eliminated: Reuven & Gali

Locations

- Lovćen National Park, Montenegro (Mausoleum of Njegoš – Guvno Lookout Point) (Starting Line)
- Lovćen National Park (Ivanova Korita (in Serbian))
- Njeguši (Konoba Batricevic-Njegusi)
- Kotor (Gurdić Gate)
- Kotor (Muzej Mačaka)
- Budva (Budva Ballerina Statue)
- Budva (Trg Slikara)
- Rijeka Crnojevića (Rijeka Crnojevića River)
- Podgorica (Cathedral of the Resurrection of Christ)

Episode summary (Episode 1)

- Seven teams began the race atop Mount Lovćen in Montenegro and had to find their first clue on a marked car. After driving to Ivanova Korita and voting to U-Turn another team, teams had to walk across a beam with only each other for support, collect four keys, and unlock their next clue from a box. Teams then had to drive to Konoba Batricevic-Njegusi in Njeguši.
- This season's first Detour was a choice between Meat (בשר) or Dairy (חלב). In Meat, teams had to make five Njeguši kobasica sausages using a handheld sausage stuffer and then hang them to dry to receive their next clue and a bottle of wine. In Dairy, one team member had to carry a cheese wheel down a hill using a wooden carrier, and their partner had to eat a piece of Njeguši cheese. After racers ate six pieces of cheese, they received their next clue and a bottle of wine.

Episode summary (Episode 2)

- After the Detour, teams found the U-Turn reveal board before driving to the Gurdić Gate in Kotor. There, teams had to convince passersby to carry them on a bed, referencing the country's 'Lazy Olympics', through town to Muzej Mačaka, where they found their next clue.
- From the cat museum, teams had to search the town for a cat, who they would discover was a person dressed as a cat, with their next clue: a music box. Teams had to figure out from the ballerina figurine and the song that they had to drive to the ballerina statue in Budva.

Episode summary (Episode 3)

- Teams had to walk on two pairs of connected stilts down Trg Slikara to receive their next clue from the tallest man in Montenegro.
- Teams then had to drive to the town of Rijeka Crnojevića, where they had to decipher an A26Z1 substitution cipher using the hint "N=13" and decode the phrase "The Bottle is the Way". After presenting their message to the judge, he placed it into a bottle and dropped it into the river. Teams had to figure out that they had to empty out their wine bottle from the Detour to discover the location of the Pit Stop: the Cathedral of the Resurrection of Christ.

Additional note

- Three teams chose to use the U-Turn on Mai & Itay.

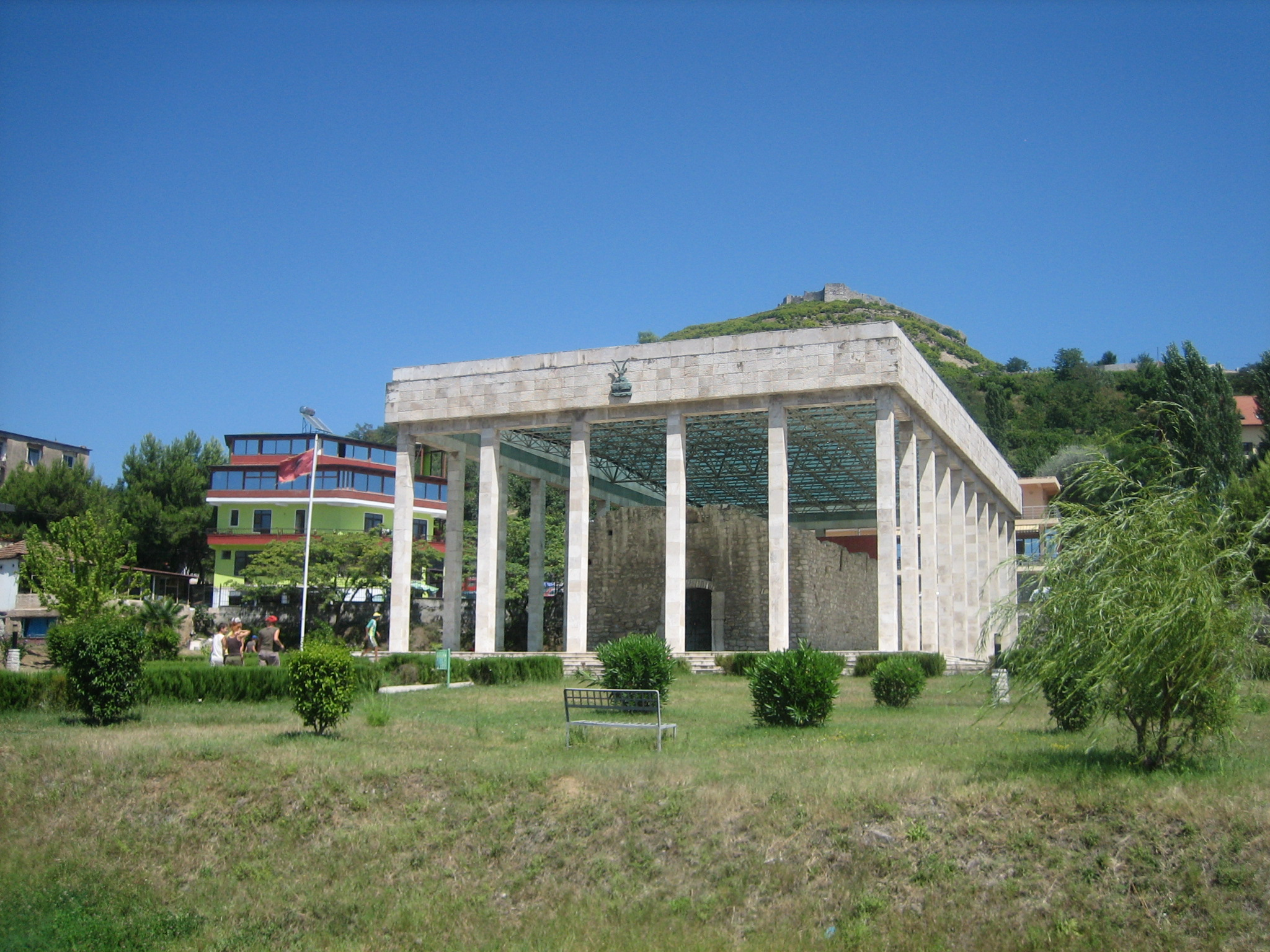
Seven additional teams concluded their race through Albania outside the Skanderbeg National Memorial.

Group B

- Airdates: 3, 7 & 9 February 2026
- Eliminated: Yotam & Nofar

Locations

- Dajti Mountain National Park, Albania (Dajti Overlook) (Starting Line)
- Dajti Mountain National Park (Dajti Ekspres Upper Gondola Station) → Tirana (Dajti Ekspres Lower Gondola Station)
- Tirana (Pyramid of Tirana)
- Tirana (Skanderbeg Square – Mother Teresa Garden)
- Krujë (Old Bazaar)
- Fishtë (Mrizi i Zanave Organic Farm)
- Lezhë (Skanderbeg National Memorial)

Episode summary (Episode 4)

- Seven additional teams began the race atop Mount Dajti in Albania and had to follow a marked path to a field and their first clue. After voting to U-Turn another team, teams were attached to a bungee chord and had to grab 10 large Albanian tiles one at a time and arrange them like dominoes so each adjacent tile had a matching pattern to receive their next clue.
- After traveling down the gondola, teams found a marked car with their next clue, which they had to figure out was the car's hanging air freshener that resembled the Pyramid of Tirana. There, teams received a clue with three colors written in Albanian and had to count the number of structures in the pyramid with those colors. The numbers gave them a three-digit combination needed to unlock their next clue.

Episode summary (Episode 5)

- From the Pyramid of Tirana, teams had to travel to the Mother Teresa Garden in Skanderbeg Square. There, teams were instructed to "connect with the legacy of Mother Teresa" to find their next clue. There were several people in the square who needed assistance; however, teams had to figure out that they were distractions and their next destination – the Old Bazaar in Krujë – was written on a monument to Mother Teresa right next to the clue box.
- This launch's Detour was a choice between Stabilize (לייצב) or Stand (להתייצב). In Stabilize, teams had to use two boards to carry 50 jars to a stand to receive their next clue. In Stand, one team member had to ride an electric skateboard resembling an Albanian carpet while their partner controlled it up a cobblestone street and past obstacles to receive their next clue.

Episode summary (Episode 6)

- After the Detour, teams found the U-Turn reveal board before driving to the Mrizi i Zanave Organic Farm. There, teams had to crack open a rose water ice dessert to find a cork with a unique letter. Teams then had to search the winery for a bottle with a matching cork. In exchange, teams received the same bottles that the other teams dropped into the river in Montenegro, and teams had to figure out from the message "The Bottle is the Way" that the location on the bottle's label – the Skanderbeg National Memorial – was the Pit Stop.

Additional notes

- Three teams chose to use the U-Turn on Adi & Or.
- When teams arrived at the Pit Stop, they learned about the teams who raced in Montenegro and that they would be starting the next leg with the team who finished in the same placement in Montenegro.

=== Leg 2 (Montenegro → Croatia) ===
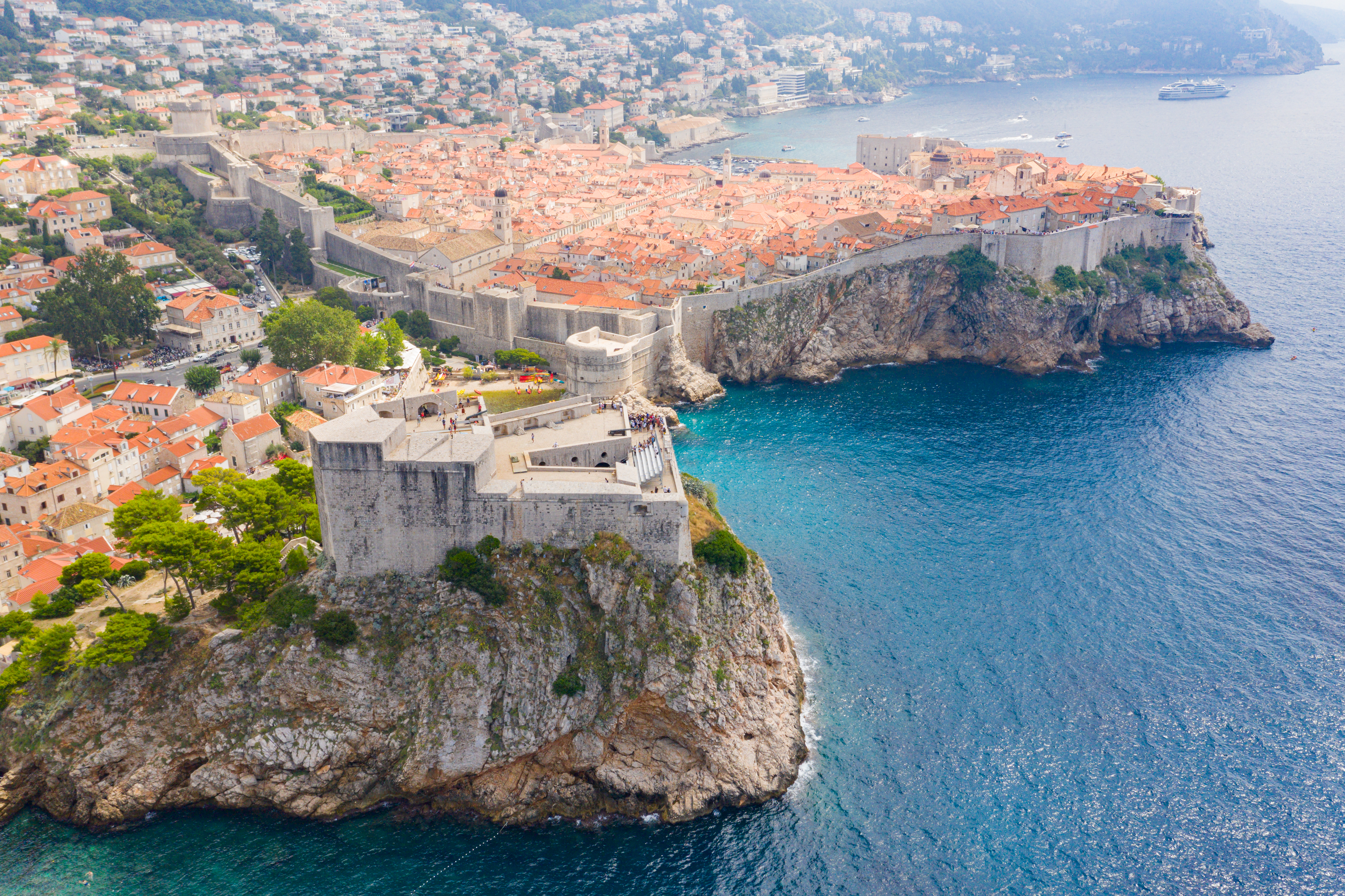
After driving from Montenegro to the walled city of Dubrovnik, teams faced their first Duel at the Fort of St. Lawrence.

- Airdates: 14, 18, 21 & 24 February 2026
- Eliminated: Emuna & Nerya

Locations

- Igalo, Montenegro (Palmon Bay Hotel & Spa)
- Dubrovnik, Croatia (Fort of St. Lawrence)
- Dubrovnik (Dubrovnik Cable Car Main Station → Dubrovnik Cable Car Top Station)
- Dubrovnik (Panorama Restaurant)
- Dubrovnik (Dubrovnik Cable Car Top Station → Dubrovnik Cable Car Main Station)
- Dubrovnik (Fort Revelin)
- Dubrovnik (Nogometno Igralište Gospino Polje)
- Dubrovnik (TUP Hall)
- Dubrovnik (Pile Gate & Minčeta Tower)
- Komolac (ACI Marina Dubrovnik – Sorkočević Summer Residence)

Episode summary (Episode 7)

- At the start of this leg, teams departed in pairs and were instructed to drive to the Fort of St. Lawrence in Dubrovnik, Croatia.
- For this season's first Duel, two teams had to don knights armor and throw monkey's fists at each other until they knocked over three pitchers. The first team to do so received their next clue, while the losing team had to choose their next opponents. The team that lost the final Duel had to wait out a 15-minute penalty. Emuna & Nerya lost the final Duel.
- After the Duel, teams had to travel by cable car to the top of Mount Srđ and vote to Yield another team. They then had to retrieve a platter of food from Panorama Restaurant and travel back down to reach Fort Revelin. There, teams had to learn how to fire breathe using powder and light a coat of arms on fire before they could present their platter to a king in exchange for their next clue.

Episode summary (Episode 8)

- After driving to Nogometno Igralište Gospino Polje, teams had to perform a blind football drill. One team member was blindfolded and had to dribble a ball through a series of cones and score a goal under guidance from their partner to receive their next clue.
- Teams then had to drive to TUP Hall, where one team member had to navigate a ring through a Nikola Tesla-inspired wire maze with their partner receiving an electric shock each time the ring touched the wire to receive their next clue.

Episode summary (Episode 9)

- After the Nikola Tesla task, teams found the Yield reveal board before driving to their next clue in Pile Gate.
- In this season's first Roadblock, one team member had to carry a five-kilogram stone up to the watchman in Minčeta Tower, where they were asked a question: "How many stairs did you climb with a stone in your hands?". Once racers gave the answer of 272, they received their next clue.

Episode summary (Episode 10)

- After the Roadblock, teams received a small paper cutout with the letter M and number 2 and had to place it on the corresponding grid location of their Dubrovnik map to find the Pit Stop: the Sorkočević Summer Residence at the ACI Marina Dubrovnik in Komolac.

Additional note

- Four teams each chose to use the Yield on Adi & Or and Ezi & Dani.

=== Leg 3 (Croatia → Hong Kong) ===
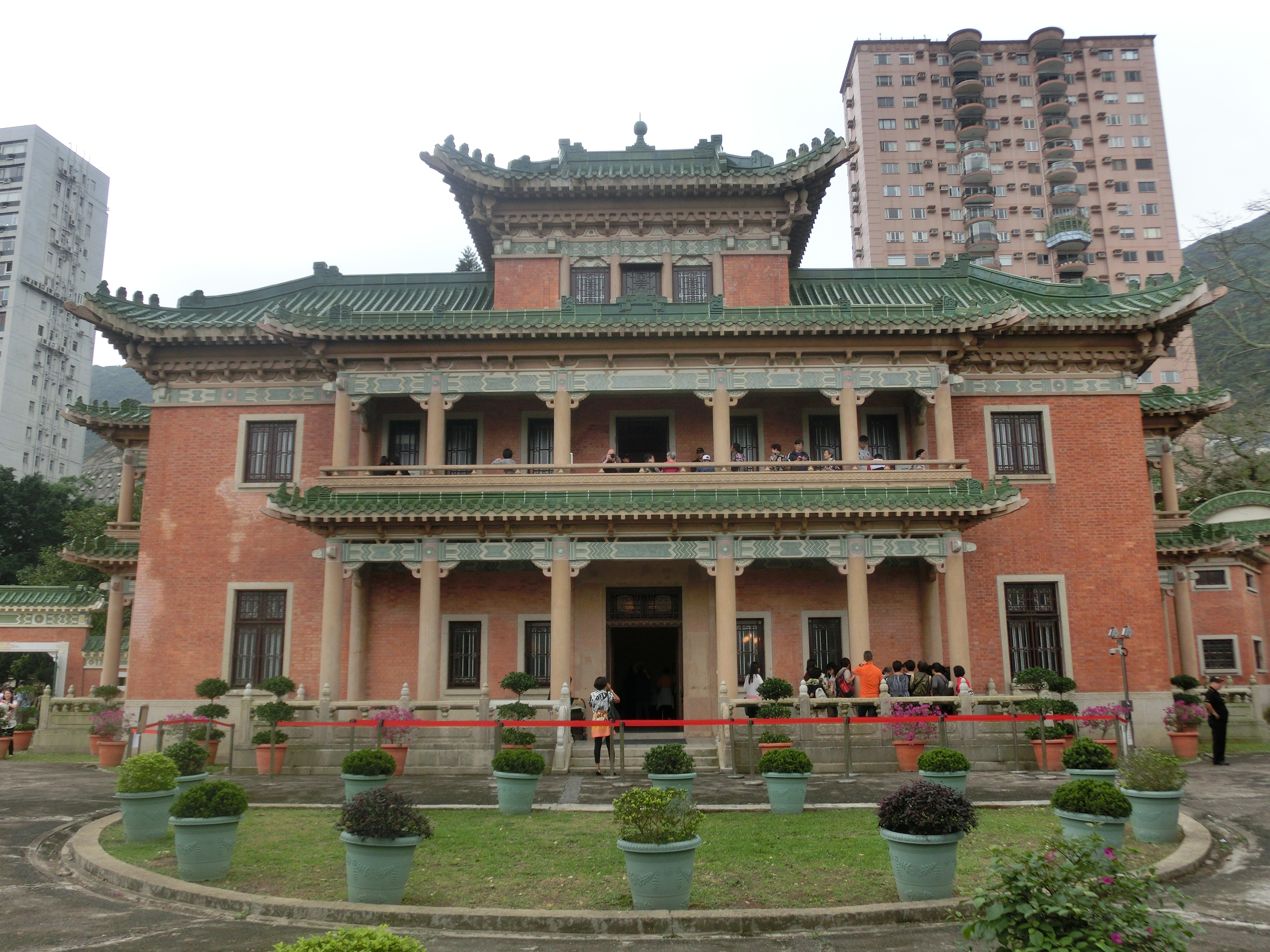
The Roadblock in Hong Kong had racers perform snake kung fu at the King Yin Lei mansion with an actual snake.

- Airdates: 3, 7, 8 & 10 March 2026
- Eliminated: Ron & Meitav

Locations

- Komolac (ACI Marina Dubrovnik – Sorkočević Summer Residence)
- Dubrovnik (Dubrovnik Airport) → Hong Kong (Hong Kong International Airport)
- Hong Kong (Kerry Hotel Hong Kong)
- Hong Kong (The Bay Hub)
- Hong Kong (Good Friend Cafe → I-Feng Mansions)
- Hong Kong (Tsim Sha Tsui Ferry Pier → Central Piers or Hung Hom Ferry Pier → North Point Ferry Pier)
- Hong Kong (Central–Mid-Levels Escalators)
- Hong Kong (Kee Hing Restaurant)
- Hong Kong (King Yin Lei)
- Hong Kong (Arsenal Street Tram Stop → Wan Chai Commercial Centre or Island Building)
- Hong Kong (Wan Chai Pier)

Episode summary (Episode 11)

- At the start of this leg, teams were instructed to fly to Hong Kong. Once there, teams were released from the Kerry Hotel Hong Kong and instructed to travel to The Bay Hub in Kowloon Bay, where one team member had to search from atop the building for a truck driving by with the solution for a Chinese pattern puzzle. Their partner then had to assemble the puzzle to receive their next clue.
- After voting to Yield another team, teams had to travel to the Good Friend Cafe in Ma Tau Kok, pick up a takeaway order, and deliver it using a tandem bicycle to a listed address written in Cantonese. When teams arrived at the I-Feng Mansions, they had to search the massive apartment complex for the correct apartment to receive their next clue, which instructed them to travel by ferry to Hong Kong Island and then search the Central–Mid-Levels Escalators for their next clue.

Episode summary (Episode 12)

- At the Central–Mid-Levels Escalators, teams had to choose a wooden Chinese chop seal and search the covered escalator system for a person wearing a shirt with the same Cantonese symbol as their seal to receive their next clue.
- Teams then had to travel to the Kee Hing Restaurant in Kowloon Bay, where one team member had to feed a plate of dumplings to their partner using a giant set of chopsticks to receive their next clue instructing them to travel to the King Yin Lei mansion in the Mid-Levels.
- In this leg's Roadblock, one team member had to memorize and perform a series of snake kung fu moves alongside an ongoing demonstration with a snake around their neck to receive their next clue.

Episode summary (Episodes 13 & 14)

- After the Roadblock, teams found the Yield reveal board before traveling by taxi or bus to the Arsenal Street Tram Stop in Wan Chai, where they had to ride the Hong Kong Tramways, colloquially known as the "Ding Ding", and look for one of two signs while on the tram – one on the Wan Chai Commercial Centre near the Fleming Road Tram Stop and the other on the Island Building near the Canal Road West Tram Stop – reading Pit Stop Wan Chai Pier that revealed the name of the Pit Stop: the Wan Chai Pier. If teams reached the Causeway Bay Terminus without finding either sign, they had to return to Arsenal Street and start again.

Additional notes

- Three teams chose to use the Yield on Adi & Or.
- The eleventh episode was originally set to air on 28 February but was postponed due to news coverage of the 2026 Israeli–United States strikes on Iran. When the episode aired on 3 March, the broadcast was briefly interrupted due to news reports of ballistic missiles launched at Israel. Following a second interruption, the episode concluded prematurely.
- The twelfth episode's broadcast was delayed 30 minutes due to a speech from Israeli Prime Minister Benjamin Netanyahu and news reports of missiles launched at Jerusalem. During the broadcast, there was another interruption as reports of missiles launched to the communities in the Negev became known. Eventually, the broadcast returned to normal.

=== Leg 4 (Hong Kong → Macau) ===
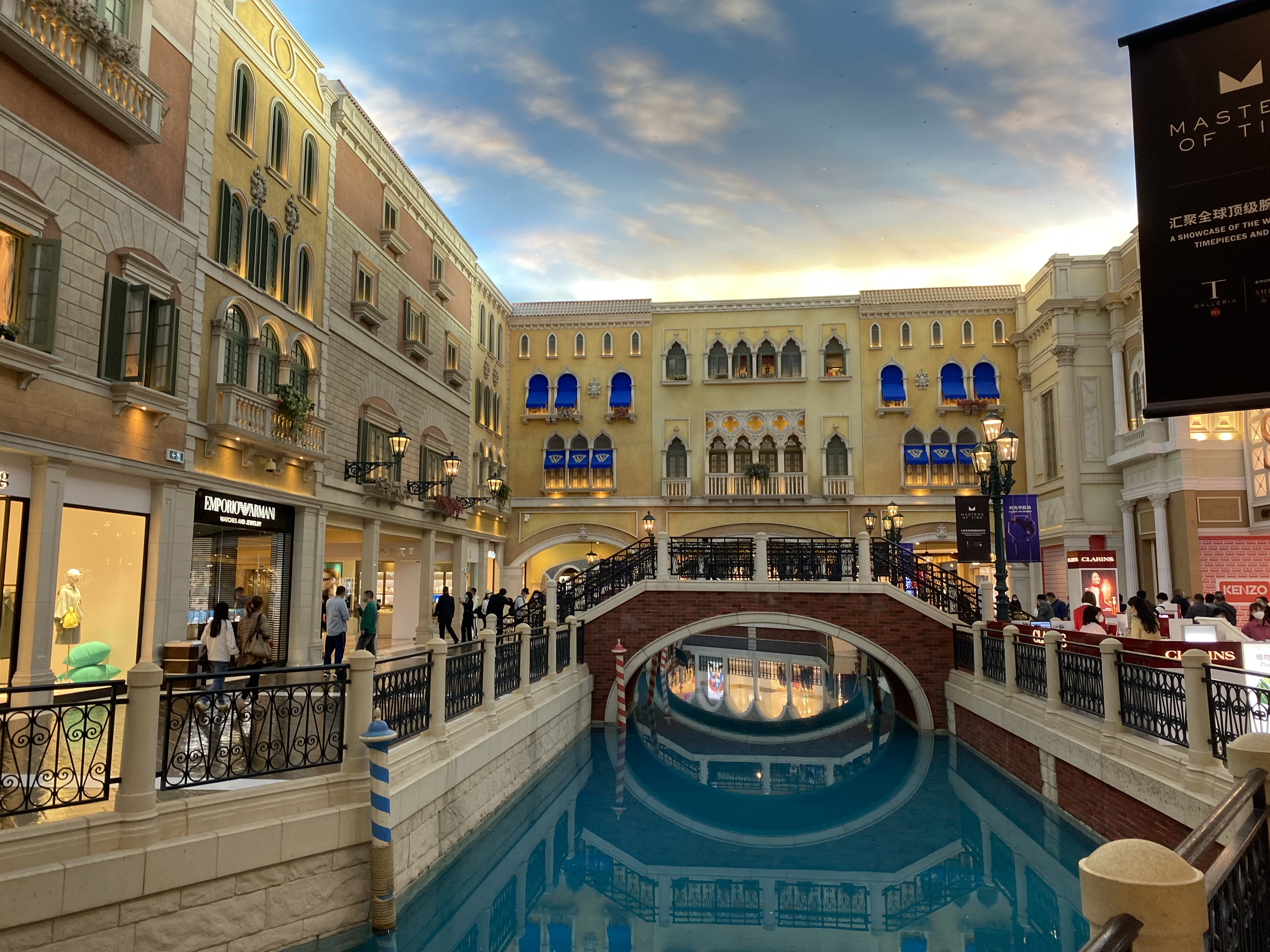
The teams immersed themselves in the gambling culture of Macau, which included a visit to The Venetian Macao resort and casino.

- Airdates: 14, 15, 17, 21 & 22 March 2026
- Eliminated: Michal & Nooni

Locations

- Hong Kong (Wan Chai Pier)
- Hong Kong (Hong Kong–Macau Ferry Terminal) → Macau (Outer Harbour Ferry Terminal)
- Macau (Sai Van Lake Square)
- Macau (A-Ma Temple)
- Macau (Centro Náutico da Praia Grande (in Chinese))
- Macau (Lisboeta Macau (in Chinese) – Macau Palace)
- Macau (Macau Fisherman's Wharf)
- Macau (The Venetian Macao – Shoppes at Venetian)
- Macau (Tap Seac Square)
- Macau (Studio City Macau – Golden Reel)
- Macau (Fortaleza do Monte)

Episode summary (Episode 15)

- At the start of this leg, teams were instructed to travel by ferry to Macau, Once there, teams received a clue from dragon dancers at Sai Van Lake Square. Teams first had to carry a gong from the square to the A-Ma Temple to receive their next clue, which sent them to the Centro Náutico da Praia Grande on the shores of Nam Van Lake.
- After voting to Yield another team, teams had to paddle a dragon boat into the lake to a buoy, retrieve one of five keys, and return to the dock. When teams chose the correct key, they could unlock their next clue, which instructed them to travel to the Macau Palace restaurant.

Episode summary (Episode 16)

- For this leg's Duel, one member from each team had to wager how many servings of a spicy Chinese dish their partner could eat. The racer with the higher number had three minutes to eat that amount to win a point; otherwise the other team received that point. The first team to win three points received their next clue, while the losing team had to wait for their next opponents. The team that lost the final Duel had to wait out a 15-minute penalty. Sapir & Sapir lost the final Duel.
- After the Duel, teams had to travel to the Macau Fisherman's Wharf. There, one team member had to spin a plate atop a stick, walk across a balance beam, and pass the spinning plate to their partner, who had to place it atop a pole. Once teams had ten plates spinning simultaneously atop the poles for ten seconds, they received their next clue, which instructed them to find their next clue at the Shoppes at Venetian shopping mall inside the The Venetian Macao.

Episode summary (Episode 17)

- Inside The Venetian Macao, teams had to convince two other people to play Chinese whispers. One racer had to state an action in Hebrew (e.g. "blow out a candle", "count to three", "bark like a dog", "eat two grapes", and "hug a blue teddy bear"), and the phrase had to be passed along to their partner, who had to perform that action using the items from a provided shelf. After three actions were completed, teams received their next clue, which sent them to Tap Seac Square.
- Once at Tap Seac Square, teams found their next clue. One team member had to stand on top of a stack of five discs, and their partner had to use a mallet to remove four of the discs without knocking off their partner until they revealed the yin and yang disc on the bottom to receive their next clue.

Episode summary (Episode 18)

- After finding the Yield reveal board, teams had to travel to the Studio City Macau and ride the Golden Reel figure-8 Ferris wheel. Teams were instructed to find the location of their next Pit Stop but had figure out that they had to find a clue hidden inside the fire blanket compartment in their capsule. The clue had the question "I want to go to the big cannon fort. How do you get there?" transliterated from Cantonese to Hebrew, which teams had to use to figure out and travel to the Pit Stop: the Fortaleza do Monte.

Additional notes

- Five teams chose to use the Yield on Michal & Nooni.
- The eighteenth episode's broadcast was interrupted and concluded prematurely due to news coverage of missile launches towards the Northern Region and casualties from a strike in Arad. The second half of the episode aired on the next day.

=== Leg 5 (Macau → Georgia) ===
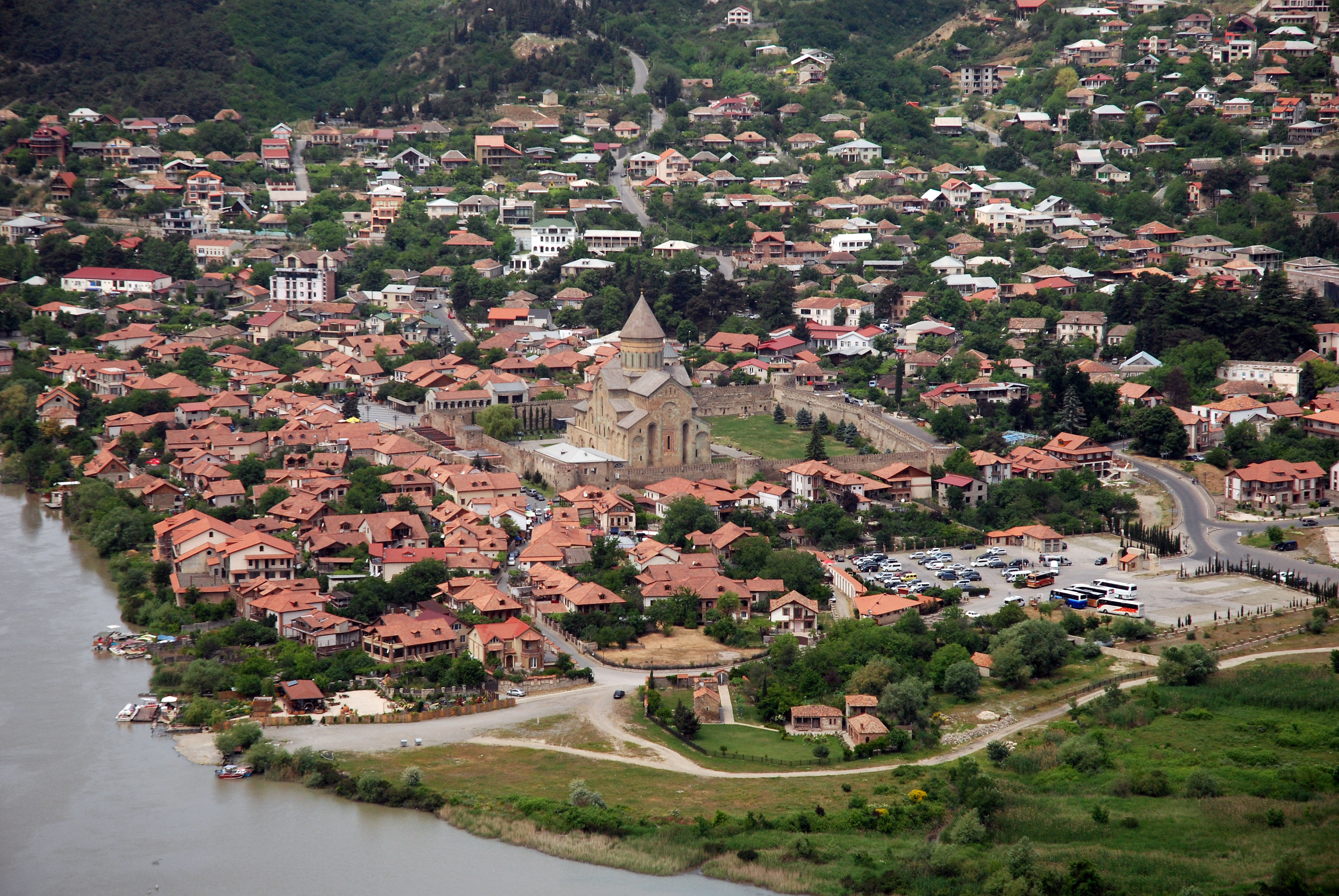
The Detour in Georgia was located in the town of Mtskheta.

- Airdates: 24, 28, 29 & 31 March 2026
- Withdrew: Chen & Yossi
- Eliminated: Tom & Samantha

Locations

- Macau (Fortaleza do Monte)
- Macau (Macau International Airport) → Tbilisi, Georgia (Tbilisi International Airport)
- Ananuri (Ananuri Fortress)
- Ananuri (Ananuri Campground)
- Akhalubani (Lake K'arp’i)
- Mtskheta (Arsukidze Street)
- Mtskheta (Mtskheta Square or Floria by Laliko)
- Tbilisi (Sokhumi State Drama Theatre (in Georgian))
- Tbilisi (Meidani Square)
- Tbilisi (Kartlis Deda)
- Tbilisi (Book House on Bakhtrioni Street)
- Tbilisi (Freedom Square)
- Tbilisi (Georgian National Academy of Sciences)

Episode summary (Episode 19)

- At the start of this leg, teams were instructed to fly to Tbilisi, Georgia. Once there, teams were released from the Ananuri Fortress, had to choose a car with a driver, and instructed to travel to a food festival at the Ananuri Campground. There, teams had to carry a supra feast table while stuck in a squatted position through a designated track with local dishes progressively added to their table without dropping anything to receive their next clue and a sack.

Episode summary (Episode 20)

- After traveling to Lake K'arp’i, one team member had to cross a lake by walking across a series of stones. Several of the stones were unstable, so their partner had to memorize a map that depicted the stable and unstable stones. After delivering the sack they received from the previous task to a merchant on the other side of the lake, teams received their next clue, which sent them to the town of Mtskheta.
- This leg's Detour was a choice between Khachapuri (חצ'אפורי) or Churchkhela (צ'ורצ'חלה). In Khachapuri, one team member had to drop eggs into a bird's nest on top of their partner's head until they caught 30 eggs. They then had to crack each egg into a filled pastry called khachapuri to receive their next clue. In Churchkhela, teams had to thread almonds and walnuts until they prepared 20 strings of a confection called churchkhela to receive their next clue.

Episode summary (Episode 21)

- After the Detour, teams had to travel to the Sokhumi State Drama Theatre in Tbilisi, where they had to learn and perform a traditional Georgian dance alongside a troupe of dancers to receive their next clue, which instructed them to travel to Meidani Square near the Meidan Bazaar in Old Tbilisi.
- After traveling to Meidani Square, teams were instructed to obtain the objects held by the Kartlis Deda monument – a bowl and a sword – without using their leg money and then deliver them to a woman beneath the monument. In exchange, teams received Shota Rustaveli's The Knight in the Panther's Skin, which contained letters from loved ones.

Episode summary (Episode 22)

- At the end of their letters, teams were told to travel to Book House on Bakhtrioni Street, where they found two more books: Alexander Pushkin's The Captain's Daughter and Giorgi Leonidze's The Wishing Tree. Teams then had to figure out from the maps in the bookstore that they had to find the location intersected by three streets named after the authors of the three books they had: Freedom Square. While intended as the Pit Stop, teams instead checked in at the Georgian National Academy of Sciences.

Additional notes

- Once in Georgia, Chen became ill. After receiving an IV infusion before starting the first task, she and Yossi decided to withdraw themselves from the race. The two were then brought to the Pit Stop for their elimination.
- When teams arrived at the Pit Stop, they had to decide whether or not they would compete for the Fast Forward on the next leg. Teams who wanted to attempt the Fast Forward and "move the clock forward" were told to begin their leg at the Shuaguli Restaurant. Teams who did not want to attempt the Fast Forward instead received a suitcase and told that they "turned back the clock" to 1985 Soviet Georgia.

=== Leg 6 (Georgia) ===
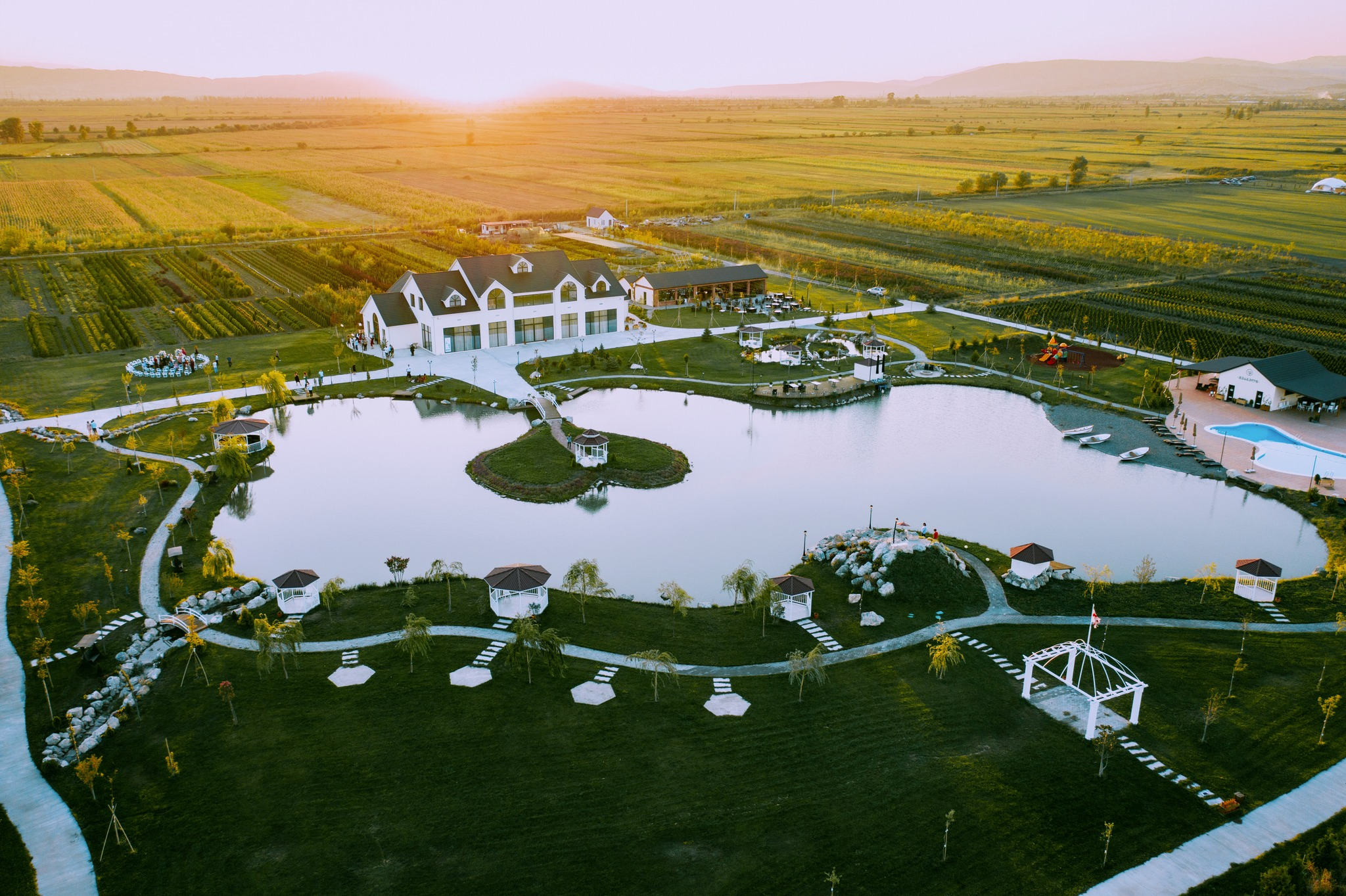
The teams were presented with the opportunity to win a Fast Forward at the Shuaguli Restaurant.

- Airdates: 4, 5 & 8 April 2026
- Eliminated: Itay & Omri

Locations

- Tbilisi (Citrus Hotel or City Inn Tbilisi)
  - Tsilkani (Shuaguli Restaurant)
- Kaspi Municipality (Zahadolti Farm)
- Kvemo Chala (Amilakhvari's Palace)
- Tbilisi (Vake Park)
- Tbilisi (Ivane Javakhishvili Tbilisi State University Library)
- Tbilisi (AM Industrial Park)
- Tbilisi (Chronicle of Georgia)

Episode summary (Episode 23)

- For this season's only Fast Forward, one team had to travel to the Shuaguli Restaurant, where they had to stack 506 wine glasses into an eleven-tiered pyramid and then pour a jug of Georgian wine without knocking over a glass. Shlomi & Asaf won the Fast Forward award.
- Before the leg began, teams who did not attempt the Fast Forward donned Soviet-style clothing from their suitcase. At the start of this leg, teams were instructed to choose a Lada Niva with a driver and travel to the Zahadolti farm. After voting to Yield another team, teams had to plant a row of 70 potatoes at equal intervals and then water them to receive their next clue. After their farm work, teams had to eat a bowl of dambalkhacho soup until they found their next location – Amilakhvari's Palace – on the bottom of the bowl.

Episode summary (Episode 24)

- In this leg's Roadblock, teams had to use a shashka to a cut a stick three times so that a peaked cap on top of it did not fall off to receive their next clue.
- After the Roadblock, teams found the Yield reveal board at Vake Park before traveling to the Ivane Javakhishvili Tbilisi State University Library. Without using a ladder or receiving assistance from other people, teams had to paste a twelve-piece Communist propaganda poster onto a wall that revealed their next destination: the AM Industrial Park.

Episode summary (Episode 25)

- Once at the industrial park, teams had to enter a Soviet telephone tapping room filled with hundreds of ringing telephones and find six that had a person on the other end of the line. The voice on each phone said one word of the phrase: "הכתובת לנקודת הסיום היא בעצם בלדה" ("The address to the Pit Stop is actually a ballad"). Teams then had to figure that their next clue was actually inside their Lada ("ב לדה") and that they had to tune their car's radio to a frequency that played Yehuda Levi announcing the Pit Stop: the Chronicle of Georgia.

Additional note

- Two teams chose to use the Yield on Ezi & Dani.

=== Leg 7 (Georgia → Jamaica) ===
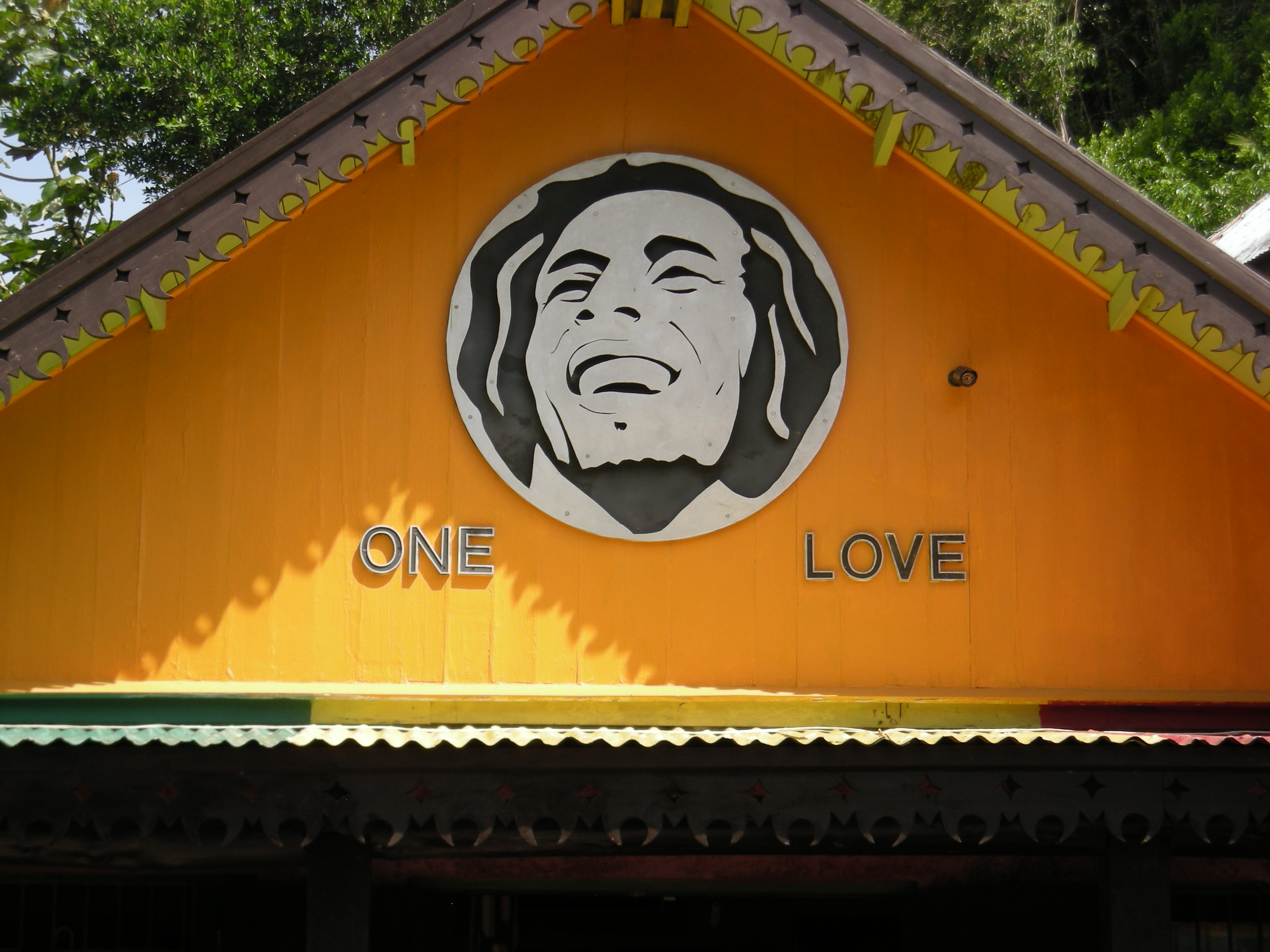
Racers performed one of Bob Marley's songs on a steelpan during the Roadblock in Jamaica.

- Airdates: 11, 12 & 14 April 2026

Locations

- Tbilisi (Chronicle of Georgia)
- Tbilisi (Tbilisi International Airport) → Montego Bay, Jamaica (Sangster International Airport)
- Coral Spring (Ocean Coral Spring)
- Ocho Rios (Pearly Beach)
- Discovery Bay (Puerto Seco Beach Park)
- Brown's Town (Brown's Town Market)
- Nine Mile (Cedella Marley Booker Basic School)
- Montego Bay (Catherine Hall Sports Complex)
- Montego Bay (Sandals Montego Bay)
- Montego Bay (Rose Hall)

Episode summary (Episode 26)

- At the start of this leg, teams were instructed to fly to Montego Bay, Jamaica. Once there, teams were released from the Ocean Coral Spring and had to travel to Pearly Beach in Ocho Rios, where they had search under 200 sandcastles for an Amazing Race flag. Teams had to rebuild any sandcastle they searched through before continuing.
- After voting to U-Turn another team, teams had to travel to Puerto Seco Beach Park. There, teams had to dress up as James Bond and a Bond girl before ziplining from a tower in Discovery Bay. The racer dressed as Bond had to drop their partner into a target, where they had to retrieve a key and unlock a briefcase containing two clues. Teams were then given the option of completing an additional task to earn an advantage that would make the upcoming Detour easier.
- If teams chose clue №1, one team member had to perform the limbo. Every time racers passed under the pole, teams earned a percentage card starting at 80% and continuing down in 20% increments to 20% that represented how much of the upcoming Detour task they had to complete. If racers knocked over the pole or ducked down, then they received the previous percentage card. After completing the limbo or choosing clue №2, teams had to travel to Brown's Town Market.

Episode summary (Episode 27)

- This season's final Detour was a choice between Drink (לשתות) or Eat (לאכול). In Drink, teams had to find a sky juice stand, make twenty drinks by shaving an ice block and adding syrup, and sell them for J$100 apiece to receive their next clue and two rastacaps. If teams had a limbo advantage, then they had to make and sell that percentage of drinks. In Eat, teams had to cut and clean three kilograms of jackfruit to receive their next clue and two rastacaps. If teams had a limbo advantage, then they had to cut and clean that percentage of jackfruit. The U-Turned team could use their limbo advantage in both tasks.
- After donning their rastacaps, teams found the U-Turn reveal board and then traveled Bob Marley's hometown of Nine Mile village to find their next clue.
- In this season's final Roadblock, one team member had to play Marley's "Three Little Birds" on a steelpan at the Cedella Marley Booker Basic School alongside a reggae band to receive their next clue. The non-participating team member could join the performance and play maracas.

Episode summary (Episode 28)

- After the Roadblock, teams found their next clue at the Catherine Hall Sports Complex in Montego Bay. There, one team member had to run a 400-meter lap around the stadium before a finjan of coffee boiled over. After drinking the coffee, teams received their next clue.
- After traveling to Sandals Montego Bay, teams had to don pirate hooks and eyepatches and pull in a treasure chest from the sea. Teams then had to find a coin with their faces on it to receive their next clue, which directed them to the Pit Stop: Rose Hall.

Additional notes

- Three teams chose to use the U-Turn on Ezi & Dani.
- This was a non-elimination leg.

=== Leg 8 (Jamaica → Peru) ===
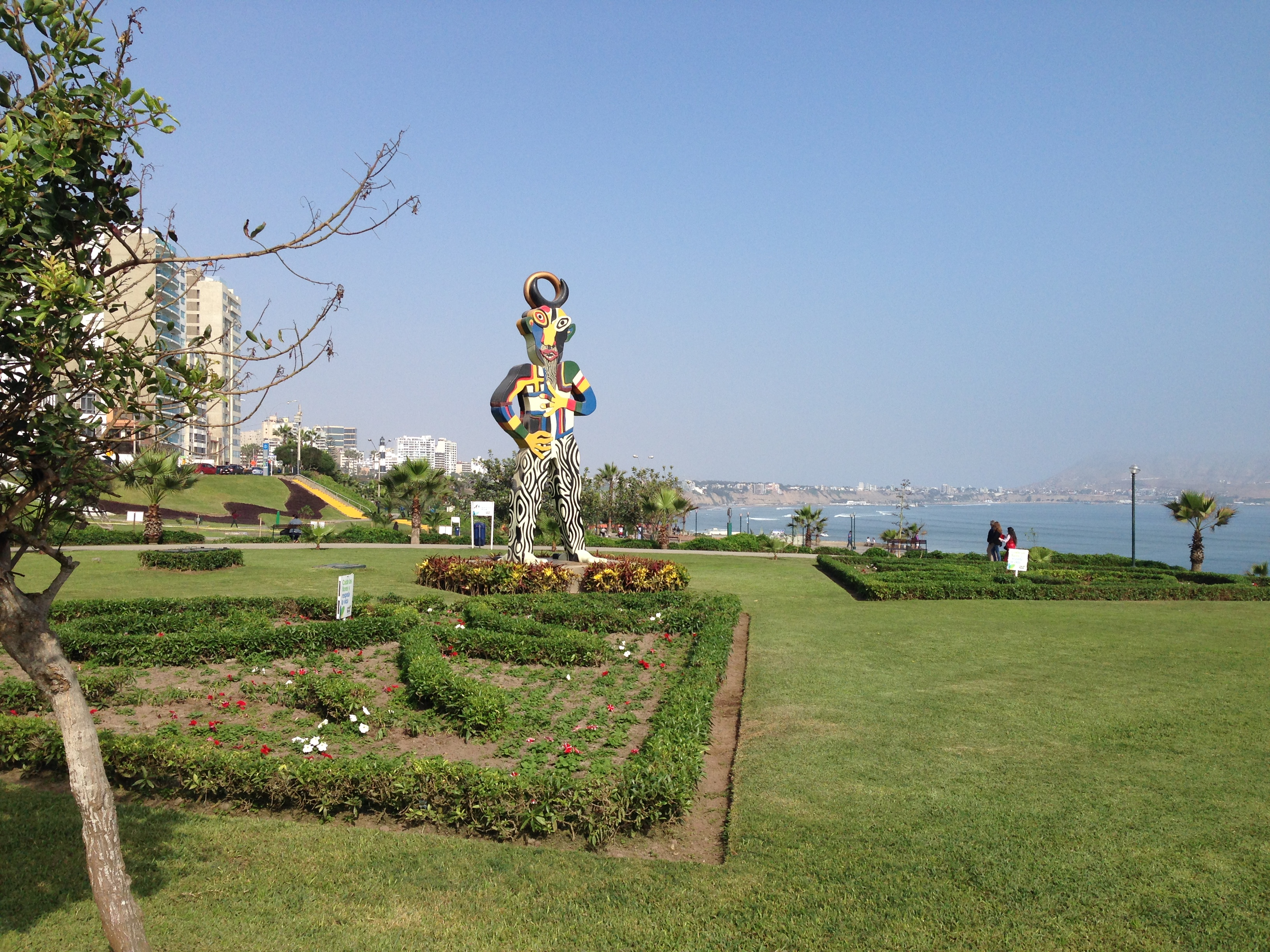
The teams found their loved ones at Yitzhak Rabin Park in Lima.

- Airdates: 15, 18, 19 & 25 April 2026 (Note: No episode aired on either 21 or 22 April due to the observance of Independence Day.)
- Eliminated: Sapir & Sapir

Locations

- Montego Bay (Rose Hall)
- Montego Bay (Sangster International Airport) → Lima, Peru (Jorge Chávez International Airport)
- Canta (Hotel Tambo Lodge)
- San Buenaventura (Imperio Guaya)
- Acochaca (in Spanish) (Carretera a Acochaca y Huacos)
- Pariamarca (in Spanish) (Carretera a Lachaqui)
- Obrajillo (Camping Tía Juana)
- Lima (Playa Punta Roquitas)
- Lima (Bajada Punta Roquitas)
- Lima (Yitzhak Rabin Park)
- Lima (Inka Plaza)
- Lima (Mateo Salado (in Spanish))

Episode summary (Episode 29)

- At the start of this leg, teams were instructed to fly to Lima, Peru. Once there, teams were released from the Hotel Tambo Lodge in Canta and had to travel to Lima's very own "Machu Picchu": Imperio Guaya. There, teams encountered an Incan welcome reception where they received glasses of chicha and quipu bracelets. Teams then had to find their next destination by figuring out that the name of town of Acochaca was embroidered on the dress of one of the huayno dancers.
- In Acochaca, teams had to assemble a statue of the Incan god Viracocha using only a small scaled-down model for reference to receive their next clue, which sent them to the town of Pariamarca.

Episode summary (Episode 30)

- In this leg's Duel, one team member from each team was strapped to a wheel spun by their partner and repeatedly dunked into water. Racers had to take water into their mouth and spit like an alpaca into a cup. The first team to fill their cup to a line received their next clue, while the losing team had to wait for their next opponents. The team that lost the final Duel had to wait out a 15-minute penalty. Ezi & Dani lost the final Duel.
- After the Duel, teams traveled to Camping Tía Juana, where they had to take part in a yunza ritual to honor the goddess Pachamama. Teams found a tree with presents hanging from it; each of which attached to ropes anchored by pieces of wood. They had to chop through the wood with an axe and released a red and yellow present with their next clue. However, teams did not know which rope was attached to which present and had to chop until the red and yellow present dropped. When teams opened the present, they found statues of two Incan god with descriptions of their characteristics. Team members had to select which god better represented themselves and then travel to Playa Punta Roquitas in Miraflores.

Episode summary (Episode 31)

- Once at the beach, teams had to climb to the top of a 278-step staircase, Bajada Punta Roquitas, by rolling two dice to determine how many steps they could climb. Much like in snakes and ladders, several steps along the way had instructions that could send teams farther up the staircase, send them back down, or force them to turn over an hourglass and wait. One step had a tablet computer that played a video message from their loved ones, who teams found when they reached the top at Yitzhak Rabin Park. After spending time with their loved ones, teams received their next clue sending them to Inka Plaza.

Episode summary (Episode 32)

- Once at the market, teams had to search among the marked stalls for their next Pit Stop. Teams had to figure out that they had to find a postcard that depicted their quipu bracelets, which were used by the Inca to send messages, and had a decoder key on the back. Teams then had to use this postcard to decode the knots on their quipus into letters that spelled out the Pit Stop: the Mateo Salado archeological site.
- After Sapir & Sapir were eliminated, Yehuda brought back the remaining teams and informed them that they had encountered a Partner Swap. Racers who had chosen the same Incan god statue were paired together. The new teams following the Partner Swap were: Ezi & Shlomi, Tom & Itay, Or & Asaf, Almog & Dani and Adi & Mai.

=== Leg 9 (Peru) ===
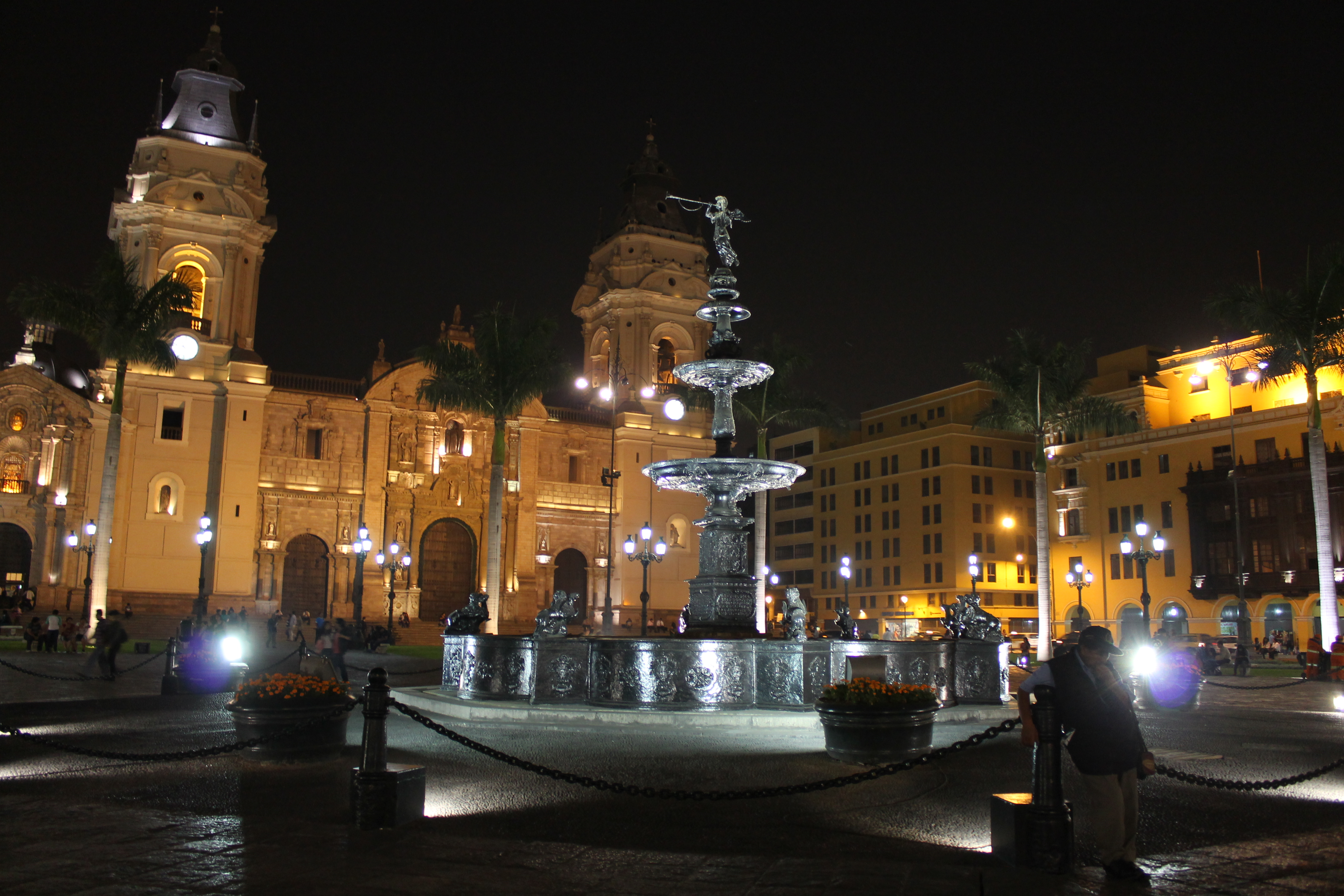
When the swapped teams reached Plaza de Armas, they had to perform one more task as individuals before checking into the Pit Stop.

- Airdates: 26, 28 & 29 April 2026
- Eliminated: Mai & Itay

Locations

- Lima (Paseo de los Héroes Navales)
- Lima (Sheraton Lima Historic Center)
- Chilca (Chilca Dunes)
- Lima (Plaza de Toros de Acho)
- Lima (Malecón Grau – El Hornero Chorrillos)
- Lima (Santa Marina Market → Compañía Italiana de Bomberos Garibaldi N°6)
- Lima (Puntarenas Restaurant)
- Lima (Plaza de Armas)

Episode summary (Episode 33)

- At the start of this leg, the swapped teams met with Yehuda on Paseo de los Héroes Navales and were instructed to find their next clue on a marked pickup truck outside of the Sheraton Lima Historic Center. Teams were then driven to the Chilca Dunes, where they had to sandboard down a marked slope to receive their next clue sending them to Plaza de Toros de Acho.
- Once at the bullring, teams had to dress as a bull with each racer facing an opposite direction and stand in the center of a circle. Teams then had three minutes to knock down three matador cutouts, each of each rose up for four seconds, to receive their next clue, which instructed them to travel by taxi to Malecón Grau.

Episode summary (Episode 34)

- For this leg's Duel, two teams had to take part in a Cajamarca Carnival tradition and throw water balloons filled with paint at each other and onto a paint canvas. The first team to throw seven balloons onto a canvas received their next clue, while the losing team had to wait for their next opponents. The team that lost the final Duel had to wait out a 15-minute penalty. Adi & Mai lost the final Duel.
- After the Duel, teams had to travel to Santa Marina Market and convince 15 people to board a bus from the market to the Compañía Italiana de Bomberos Garibaldi N°6 fire station with a fare of one Peruvian sol. If a passenger left before they reached the fire station, teams had to find a new person to ride the bus. After reaching their destination and disembarking all their passengers, teams found their next clue outside of Puntarenas Restaurant.
- Once at the restaurant, teams received a letter and had to decipher their next location. Teams had to figure out from the letterhead "CodeInTheNo." that they had to use to phone number on the letter (945-816-298). Each digit corresponded to a word on a line of the letter (ex. the second digit 4 referred to the fourth word on the second line of the letter). Once teams decoded "You must reach the central square where your final clue awaits you" ("עליכם להגיע לכיכר המרכזית שם ממתין לכם הרמז האחרון"), they had to travel to Plaza de Armas.

Episode summary (Episode 35)

- After teams arrived at Plaza de Armas, they faced one more task as individuals. Racers had to search among 150 National Symphony Orchestra musicians for one who was faking their performance. Once both racers from an original team found a correct musician, they could check in at the Pit Stop.

=== Leg 10 (Peru → Uruguay) ===
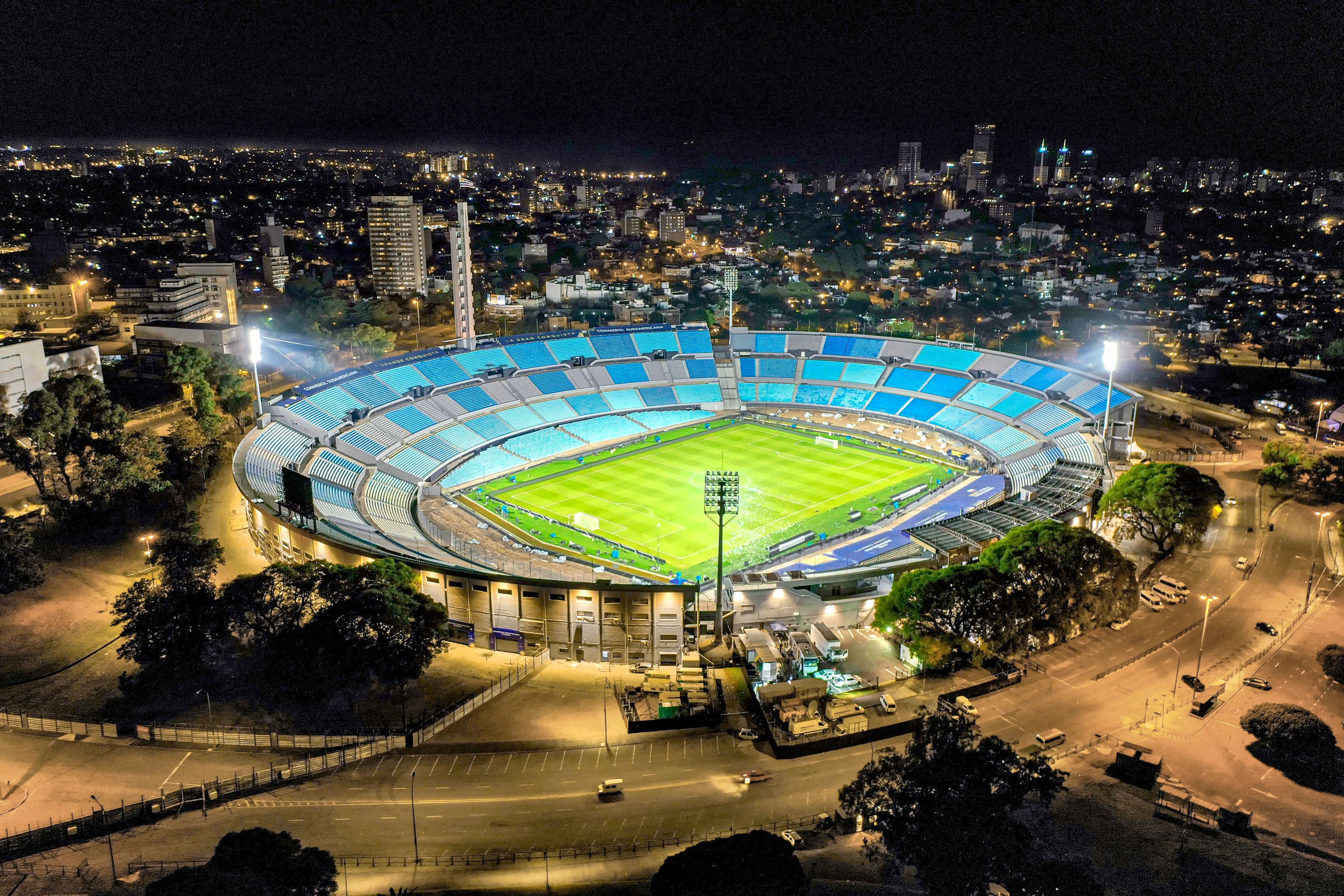
The final memory challenge in Montevideo to determine the final three teams was set at Estadio Centenario, the venue for the first FIFA World Cup.

- Airdates: 2, 3 & 5 May 2026
- Eliminated: Shlomi & Asaf

Locations

- Lima (Plaza de Armas)
- Lima (Jorge Chávez International Airport) → Montevideo, Uruguay (Carrasco International Airport)
- Montevideo (Aloft by Marriott Montevideo Hotel)
- Montevideo (Punta Brava Lighthouse Parking Lot)
- Montevideo (Bar Facal – Carlos Gardel Statue)
- Montevideo (18 de Julio Avenue 1233)
- Ciudad de la Costa (El Establo)
- Montevideo (Plaza de Cagancha – Ramal Viajes Travel Agency)
- Montevideo (Estadio Centenario)
- Montevideo (Port of Montevideo – Acceso Yacaré)

Episode summary (Episode 36)

- At the start of this leg, teams were instructed to fly to Montevideo, Uruguay. Once there, teams were released from the Aloft by Marriott Montevideo Hotel and instructed to travel to the parking lot of the Punta Brava Lighthouse. There, one team member had to direct their partner to drive a collector vehicle out of a lot with nine other cars. Much like Rush Hour, racers could only move the surrounding cars either forwards or backwards.
- After freeing their car, teams received a tablet with a video of Yehuda dressed as Carlos Gardel in front of a bar set to Gardel's song "Por una cabeza". Teams had to figure out that they had to drive to Gardel's statue outside of Bar Facal to find their next clue. Teams were then instructed to find their next clue using the hint "it takes two to tango". One racer had to sit on the empty seat next to the Gardel statue and spot the reflection of a sign that read "The clue is here" ("הרמז כאן") across the street. Teams then had to find the sign on an apartment building adjacent to the Bar Facal and find an apartment with their next clue, which instructed them to drive to El Establo.

Episode summary (Episode 37)

- At El Establo, teams had to dress as gauchos and lasso a set of five posts so they could pull themselves forward on a hay cart to their next clue.
- Teams then had to drive to the Ramal Viajes Travel Agency, where they had to find a man named Marco and purchase ferry tickets for him to Buenos Aires, in reference to 3000 Leagues in Search of Mother, to receive their next clue.

Episode summary (Episode 38)

- After driving to Estadio Centenario, teams had to fill in a digital scorecard of the first nine legs. The first two columns had the placements of each team at the start and end of each leg with teams having to fill in two missing placements on the third and sixth legs. For the second two columns, teams had to search the stadium's seats for color-specific envelopes with photographs of this season's teams and objects they encountered on the race. Teams then had to scan the photographs and place the eliminated teams and objects with the correct leg. Once teams were correct, a football opened to reveal their next clue, which directed them to the Pit Stop: the Port of Montevideo. The correct answers were:

Correct answers
Leg	Adi & Or		Ezi & Dani		Shlomi & Asaf		Tom & Almog		Team	Object
1	—N/a	6	—N/a	4	—N/a	3	—N/a	5	Reuven & Gali/Yotam & Nofar	Bottle
2	6	8	4	5	3	11	5	7	Emuna & Nerya	Nikola Tesla
3	8	3	5	8	11	5	7	9	Ron & Meitav	Chop seal
4	3	4	8	7	5	1	9	2	Michal & Nooni	Plate spinning rod
5	4	6	7	3	1	1	2	7	Tom & Samantha	Freedom Square
6	6	4	3	5	1	1	7	6	Itay & Omri	Fast Forward
7	4	5	5	6	1	4	6	1	Non-elimination leg	Maraca
8	5	2	6	4	4	3	1	1	Sapir & Sapir	Viracocha
9	—N/a	4	—N/a	2	—N/a	3	—N/a	1	Mai & Itay	Bus fare collection can

=== Leg 11 (Uruguay → Argentina) ===
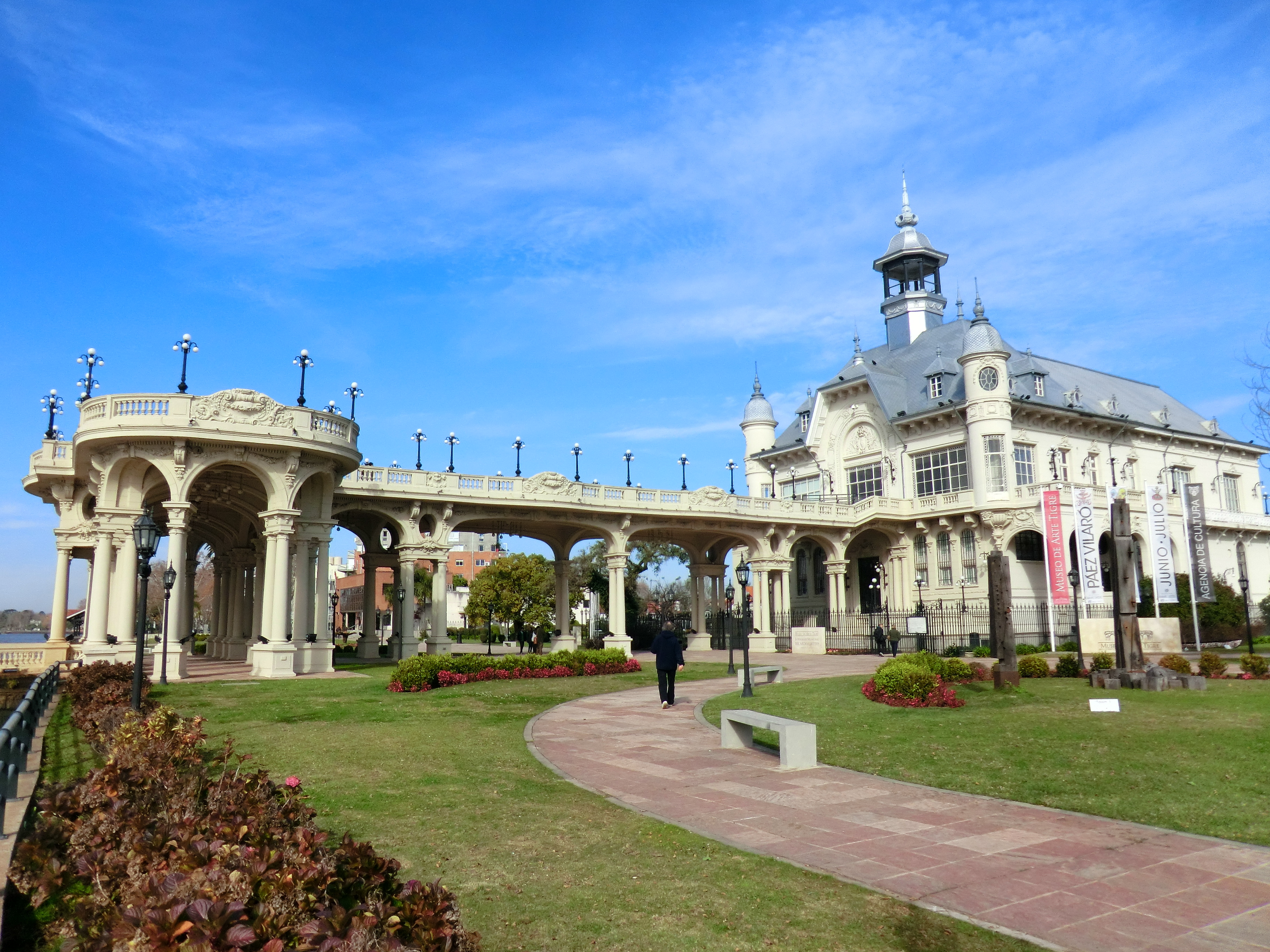
The finish line for HaMerotz LaMillion 2026 was located at the Museo de Arte de Tigre outside of Buenos Aires.

- Airdates: 9 & 10 May 2026
- Prize: ₪1,000,000
- Winners: Tom & Almog
- Runners-up: Adi & Or
- Third place: Ezi & Dani

Locations

- Montevideo (Port of Montevideo – Terminal Fluvial de Montevideo) → Buenos Aires, Argentina (Puerto Madero)
- Buenos Aires (Boulevard Rosario Vera Peñaloza)
- Buenos Aires (Dársena Norte)
- Buenos Aires (Puente de la Mujer)
- Buenos Aires (Mafalda Statue)
- Tigre (Torre de las Naciones)
- Buenos Aires (Teatro Lola Membrives (in Spanish))
- Buenos Aires (Casa Rosada)
- Buenos Aires (Plaza Armenia (in Spanish))
- Tigre (Museo de Arte de Tigre)

Episode summary (Episode 39)

- When teams arrived at the previous Pit Stop, they were informed by Yehuda that they would travel by ferry to Buenos Aires, Argentina, for the final leg. Once there, teams met with Yehuda on Boulevard Rosario Vera Peñaloza to begin the leg. At the start of this leg, teams had to swing from a shipping container onto a seesawing platform resembling the flag of Argentina suspended 10 metres (33 ft) above the ferry port. While maintaining balance to avoid falling into the water, racers had to retrieve six missing sun rays and place them onto the flag's sun in the center to receive their next clue.
- Teams then had to travel on foot to Puente de la Mujer, where they had to assemble a dinosaur cart, in reference to Argentina's contributions to paleontology, and then use it to travel to the Mafalda Statue in San Telmo to receive their next clue. From the statue, teams had to drive to the Torre de las Naciones in Tigre.
- For this season's final Duel, two teams had to climb to the top of the 70-metre (230 ft) building using a mechanical ascender with each racer tethered to their partner and unfurl an Amazing Race flag. The first team to do so received their next clue, while the losing team had to wait for their next opponents. The team that lost the final Duel had to wait out a 15-minute penalty. Tom & Almog lost the final Duel.

Episode summary (Episode 40)

- After the Duel, teams had to drive to Teatro Lola Membrives, where they had to watch a performance of "Don't Cry for Me Argentina". Teams had to figure out that the Eva Perón performer was singing on the balcony of Casa Rosada, where they would find their next clue. Teams then had to drive to Plaza Armenia.
- At Plaza Armenia, teams had to find a local who could video call a friend in Tel Aviv and show them the letters and numbers that were illuminated on Tel Aviv City Hall: TLV12. Teams had to use this code to unlock a box in their car and retrieve their final clue, which directed them to the finish line: the Museo de Arte de Tigre.

== Ratings ==
Data courtesy of the Israeli Rating Committee, according to individuals aged 4+ from the general population.

No.	Air date	Episode	Percentage	Nightly Rank	Jewish Household Percentage	Viewers	Ref
1	24 January 2026	"Premiere Episode!"	8.3%	1	21.6%	569,000	
2	27 January 2026	"Storm in Montenegro"	7.1%	1	20.9%	482,000	
3	31 January 2026	"The First Elimination"	7.2%	1	18.5%	495,000	
4	3 February 2026	"The Second Launch"	6.9%	1	17.1%	515,000	
5	7 February 2026	"Omri's Test"	7.1%	1	19.0%	529,000	
6	9 February 2026	"Drama at the End"	6.2%	1	17.4%	467,000	
7	14 February 2026	"The Teams Unite"	7.3%	1	20.2%	546,000	
8	18 February 2026	"Meitav and Ron's Crisis"	7.2%	1	17.8%	541,000	
9	21 February 2026	"The Brilliant Move"	7.7%	1	19.3%	577,000	
10	24 February 2026	"Shlomi Breaks Down"	6.8%	1	18.7%	509,000	
11	3 March 2026	"Typhoon in Hong Kong"	7.6%	2	20.2%	580,000	
12	7 March 2026	"Mai & Itay's Breakup"	6.7%	3	18.0%	513,000	
13	8 March 2026	"Or & Adi's Move"	8.2%	1	20.7%	615,000	
14	10 March 2026	"A Revolution in the Elimination"	6.7%	3	17.2%	502,000	
15	14 March 2026	"Landing in Macau"	7.4%	2	17.6%	556,000	
16	15 March 2026	"Civil War in Macau"	7.0%	2	16.7%	528,000	
17	17 March 2026	"The Cards Are Being Dealt in Macau"	7.0%	2	17.1%	522,000	
18	21 March 2026	"The Elimination Wheel"	8.2%	2	19.0%	612,000	
18	22 March 2026	"The Elimination Wheel"	7.7%	2	18.6%	577,000	
19	24 March 2026	"The Drama in Georgia"	7.9%	1	19.6%	588,000	
20	28 March 2026	"The Day That Got Out of Control"	8.5%	1	20.3%	634,000	
21	29 March 2026	"An Unusual Night in Georgia"	8.2%	1	20.3%	611,000	
22	31 March 2026	"The Painful Elimination"	7.7%	1	18.1%	580,000	
23	4 April 2026	"The Race Goes Back in Time"	9.2%	1	21.5%	688,000	
24	5 April 2026	"Fates Are Decided in an Instant"	9.4%	1	22.2%	702,000	
25	8 April 2026	"The Impossible Elimination"	6.9%	1	16.5%	516,000	
26	11 April 2026	"The Jamaican Turnaround"	8.5%	1	20.5%	636,000	
27	12 April 2026	"Father's Test"	7.1%	1	17.5%	530,000	
28	14 April 2026	"The Best-Kept Secret is Revealed"	6.4%	1	16.7%	480,000	
29	15 April 2026	"The Wild Relationship Test"	5.8%	1	15.4%	432,000	
30	18 April 2026	"A Day Without Air in Peru"	7.4%	1	18.4%	557,000	
31	19 April 2026	"Meeting at the Top of the Stairs"	5.9%	1	16.9%	442,000	
32	25 April 2026	"Quarter-Final Elimination"	7.3%	1	16.6%	545,000	
33	26 April 2026	"The Teams Mix"	6.8%	1	17.6%	511,000	
34	28 April 2026	"Or's Choice"	6.0%	1	15.4%	447,000	
35	29 April 2026	"Semi-Final Elimination"	6.5%	1	17.3%	484,000	
36	2 May 2026	"Drama in the Semi-Finals"	7.3%	1	17.8%	547,000	
37	3 May 2026	"Friendship on Trial"	6.3%	1	17.5%	474,000	
38	5 May 2026	"The Final Three are Revealed"	6.6%	1	17.5%	496,000	
39	9 May 2026	"The Tearful Finale"	7.2%	1	19.5%	539,000	
40	10 May 2026	"The Finale!"	9.1%	1	23.2%	679,000	
41	13 May 2026	"Pit Stop"	4.4%	1	12.6%	327,000	
