= HaMerotz LaMillion 11 =

Season of television series

- Season 11
- Presented by: Yehuda Levi

Release
- Original network: Channel 12

Additional information
- Filming dates: 13 June – 10 July 2026

Series chronology
- ← Previous; Season 10

HaMerotz LaMillion 11 is the upcoming eleventh season of HaMerotz LaMillion (Hebrew: המירוץ למיליון, lit. The Race to the Million), an Israeli reality competition show based on the American series The Amazing Race, and the third installment of Channel 12's iteration of the show. Hosted by Yehuda Levi, it will feature teams of two, each with a pre-existing relationship, in a race around the world to win ₪1,000,000.

== Production ==
=== Development and filming ===
On 13 May 2026, Yehuda Levi announced that the show was renewed for an additional season at the end of the reunion for HaMerotz LaMillion 10. Filming for this season began on 13 June 2026.

=== Casting ===
Keshet Media Group announced on 2 December 2025 that casting would open in January 2026. Casting for this season concluded at the end of April 2026. The cast was finalized in May 2026.

== Cast ==
The cast for this season includes Olympic medalist Oren Smadja.

Contestants	Age	Relationship	Hometown	Status
Oren Smadja (אורן סמדג'ה)	55	Father & Son	Ganot Hadar	Participating
Rom Smadja (רום סמדג'ה)	22	Father & Son	Ganot Hadar	Participating

== Race summary ==
Destinations	Air travel Rail travel Water travel Bus travel Helicopter travel Bicycle travel Gondola travel
Route Markers	צומת (Detour) מחסום (Roadblock) קיצור דרך (Fast Forward) דו–קרב (Duel) פרסה (U-Turn) עצור (Yield) חילופי זוגות (Partner Swap) נקודת סיום (Pit Stop)

=== Leg 1 (Israel) ===
Locations

- Israel (Starting Line)
