= Renuar =

Israeli fashion company

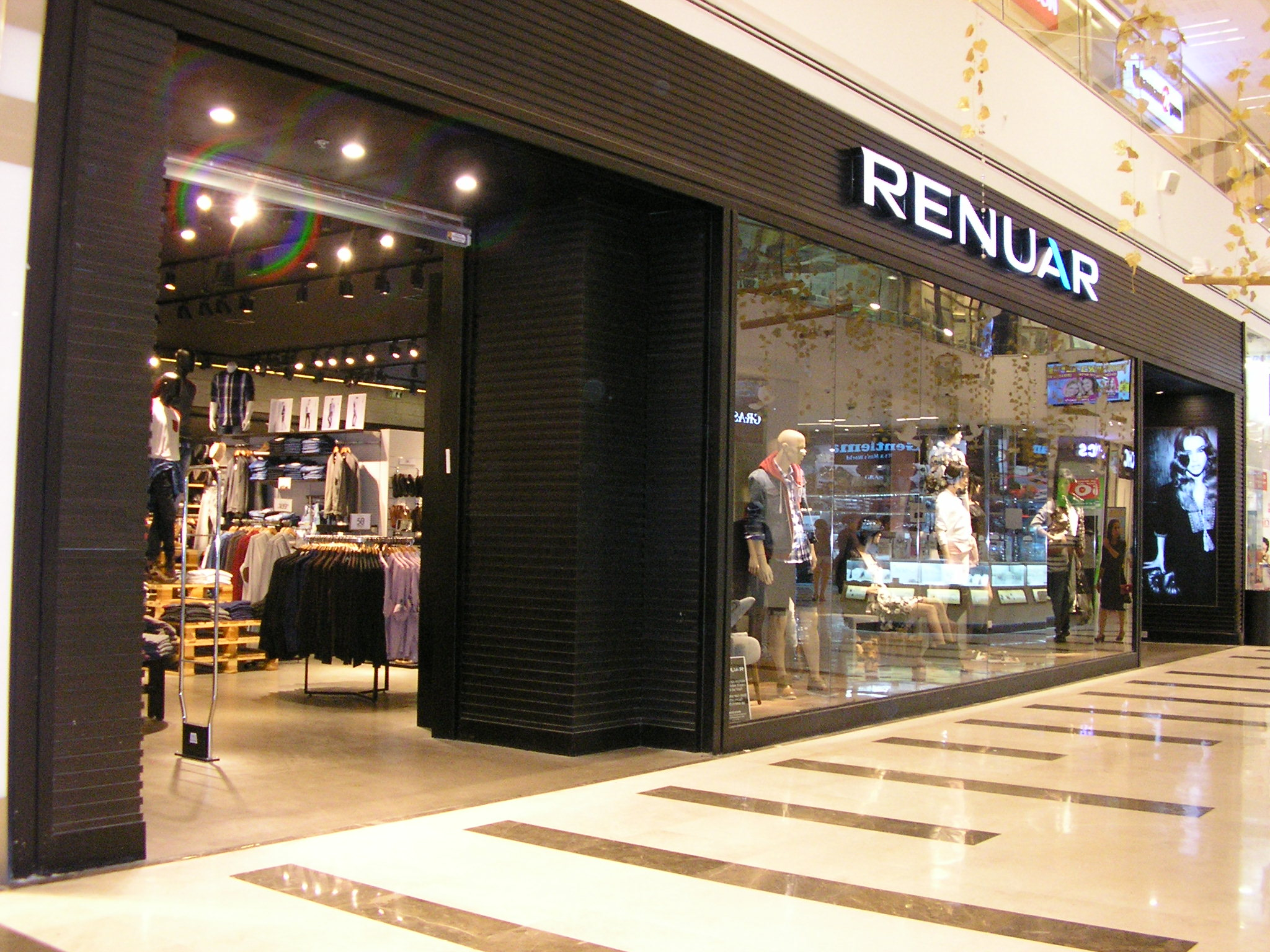
- Industry: Fashion and Textiles
- Founder: Eli Berkovich
- Area served: Israel
- Operating income: (2018)
- Net income: 500 Million Shekel
- Number of employees: 1,300
- Website: www.renuar.co.il

Renuar (Hebrew: רנואר) is a fashion retailer in Israel that operates the fashion chain of the "Renuar" and "Twentyfourseven" brands. The chain markets clothing, footwear, jewelry, bags, and fashion accessories.

== History ==
In 1993, the Renuar Group was founded by businessmen Eli Berkowitz and Yossi Brosh. A year later, in 1994, Serge Deri joined them, and since then he has served as Group CEO.

The Renuar Group has branches spread nationwide at the largest malls in Israel. Most of the sales points operated by the Group are sold through both its owned stores and through a franchise set.

By 2016 it was estimated to be the fifth largest fashion chain in Israel.

The group has about 1,300 employees. About 300 employees at the company's headquarters and logistics center in Rishon Lezion, the other employees are employed at 95 sales points throughout Israel.
