= Chronicle of Georgia =

Monument in Tbilisi, Georgia

- საქართველოს მატიანე
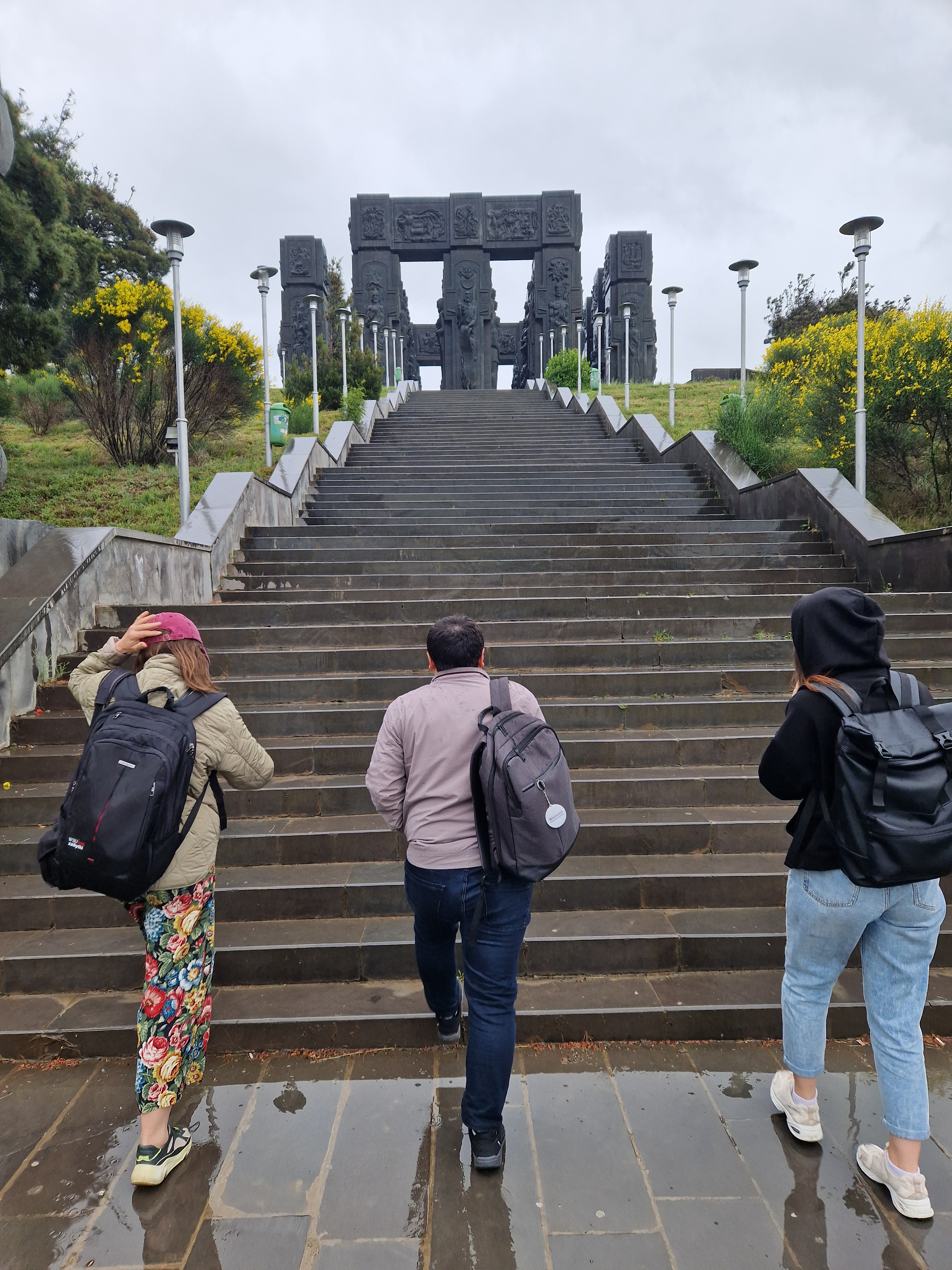
- Interactive map of Chronicle of Georgia
- Location: Keeni Hill, Tbilisi, Georgia
- Coordinates: 41.770503°N 44.810438°E
- Type: Monument
- Material: Bronze, Stone
- Height: 35 metres
- Beginning date: 1985

The Chronicle of Georgia (Georgian: საქართველოს მატიანე, romanized: sakartvelos mat'iane) or History Memorial of Georgia is a monument located on Keeni Hill near the Tbilisi Sea. It was created by the Georgian sculptor Zurab Tsereteli in 1985 but was never fully finished. The monument sits at the top of a large set of stairs, overlooking the northern part of the city from different directions. There are 16 pillars that are between 30–35 meters tall. The top half features kings, queens, and heroes while the bottom part depicts stories from the life of Christ. Beside bronze pillars, there is a grapevine cross of Saint Nino, who first brought Christianity to Georgia, and a chapel.

== Background ==
=== Location ===
The Chronicle of Georgia is located on Keeni Mountain, a large hill in the northern part of Tbilisi. The monument lies in the Nadzaladevi District, and can be accessed by road through Unknown Heroes Street. There is a large set of steps on the way to the monument. The monument is also unique as it is located at the northern point of the Tbilisi Sea.

=== Religion ===
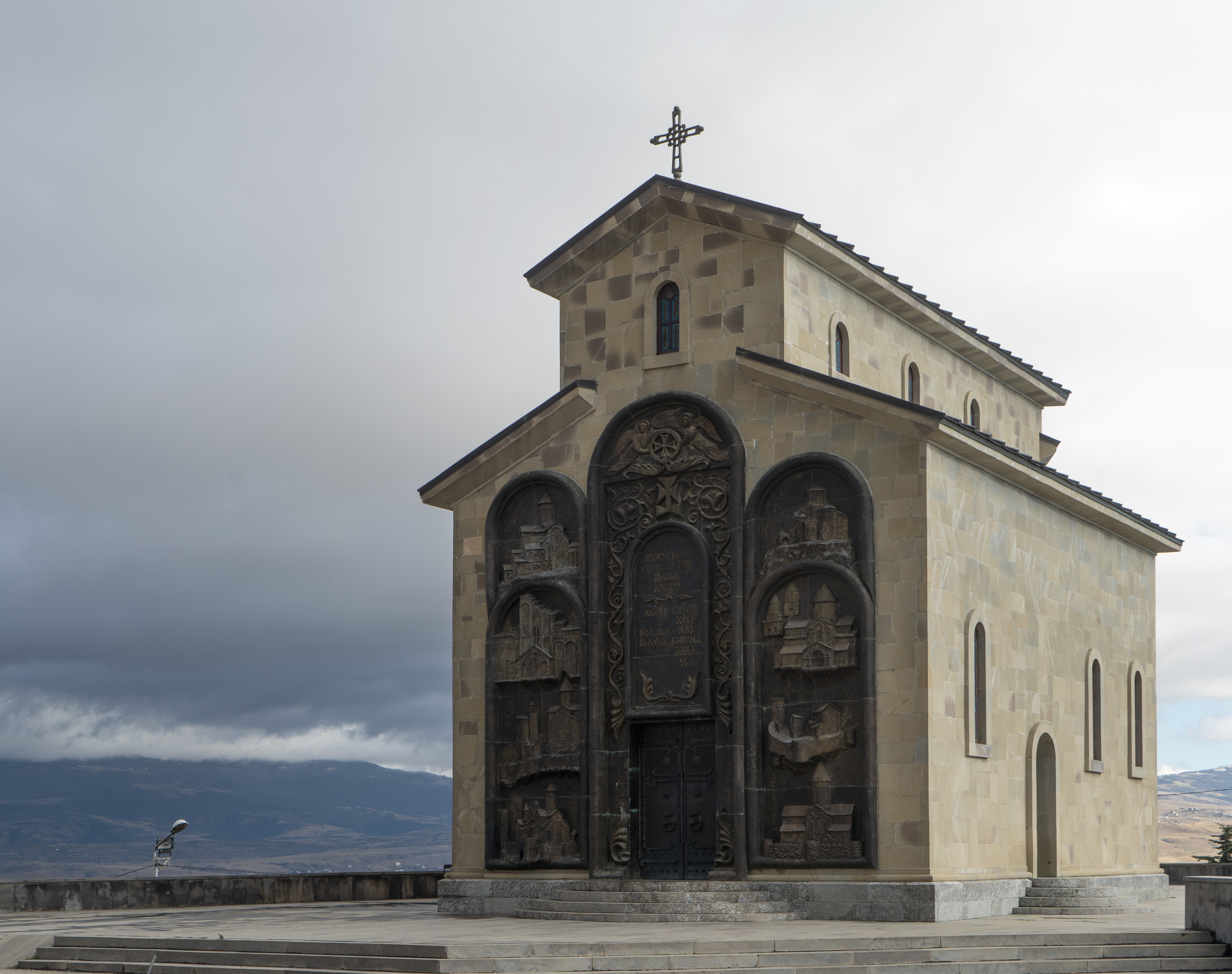
Church of the Annunciation at the Chronicle of Georgia monument

A large part of the Chronicle of Georgia is related to religion. Saint Nino, the enlightener of Georgia, was a woman who preached Christianity in Georgia. The grapevine cross is her symbol. The church next to the Chronicle of Georgia is the church commemorating her. Georgia converted to Christianity in 337 AD, the year King Mirian III declared Christianity the state religion. The spread of Christianity resulted in the ancient Georgian characters being replaced them with new characters mixed with Greek orthography and Syriac alphabet. However, the spread of Christianity also boosted the growth of literature and arts.
