= Posters in the Soviet Union =

Posters were a common method of distributing propaganda in the Soviet Union from the country's inception. Artistic styles and approaches to subject matter shifted and evolved alongside political and social changes within the country. Subject matter varied widely, with some topics including the promotion of communism and socialism, agriculture, education, health, international relations, literacy, patriotism, war, and work ethics.

Posters were used in part because they could motivate and communicate ideas to a population with large percentages of illiterate and semiliterate individuals. They were often posted on the street, on and in vehicles, and in communal buildings such as factories and schools. Visual art in public spaces was also not a new concept, as Russia had a "strong visual tradition" already in the form of religious icons and lubok woodcuts.

== History ==
Posters in the Russian Empire had largely only been used for advertising. The earliest propaganda posters in Soviet Russia appeared in August 1918 and focused on the Russian Civil War, with this remaining the primary subject until 1921. Between 1919 and 1921, the Russian Telegraph Agency produced ROSTA windows, posters which featured simplified cartoons and short pieces of text or mottoes. A rising sun was a common symbol of posters of the era, representing a new beginning for the newly formed country.

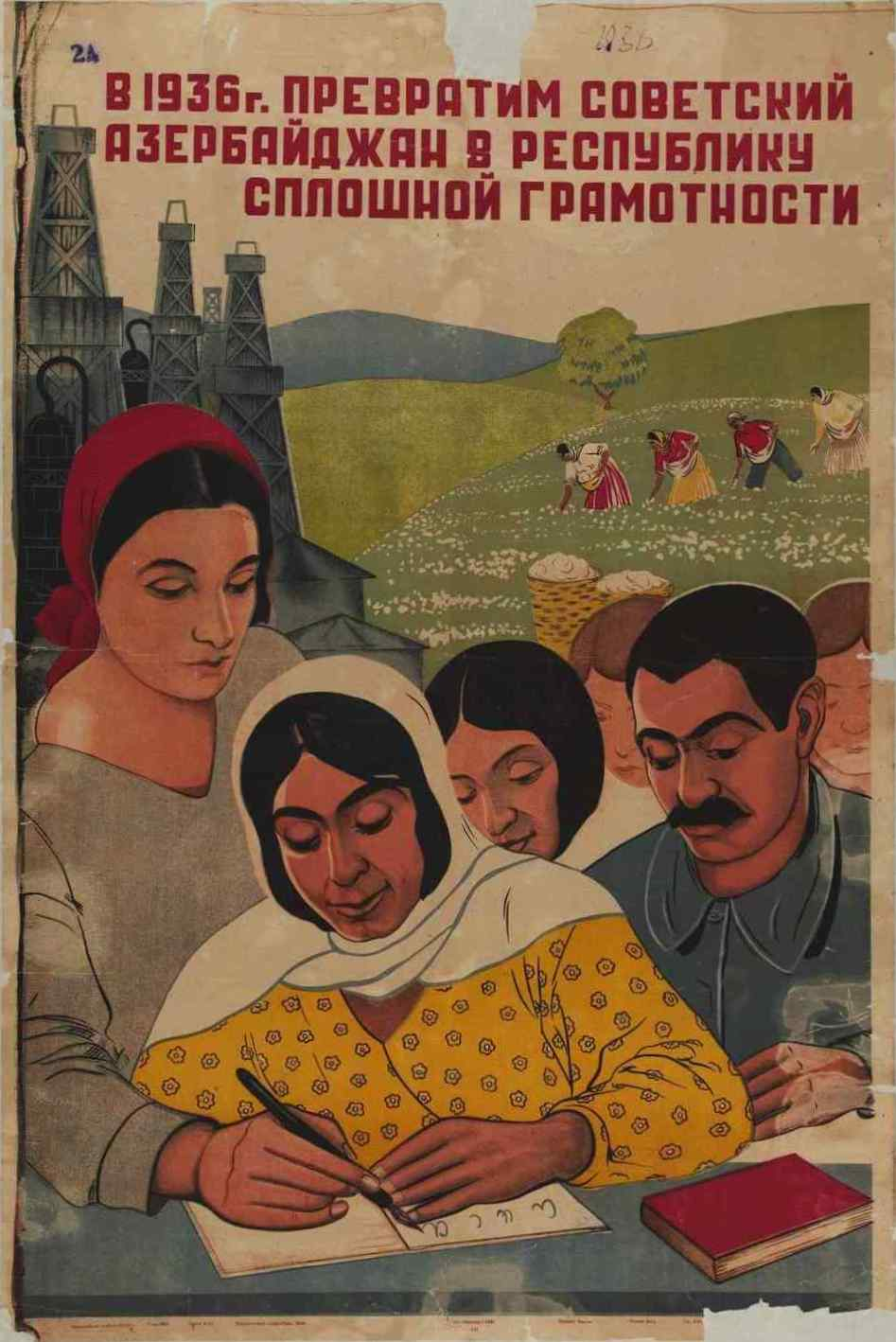
1936 poster from Azerbaijan promoting literacy

In the 1920s, posters diversified to spotlight a variety of subjects and to promote government initiatives surrounding industrialization, health and children's welfare, and literacy (especially among women), among other priorities. Subject matter shifted from a focus on an immediate enemy to a focus on "persuading [viewers] of the benefits of whatever was the subject of that particular poster". At this point, posters again began being used to advertise state-produced products and to suggest that such products were readily available, normal to obtain, and superior to foreign goods. In many cases, posters directly linked socialism to the social programs or goods being promoted. Posters were used to discourage alcohol consumption beginning in the 1920s and continuing until the late 1980s.

In 1931, all poster production was centralized under the Art Department of the State Publishing House under the Central Committee. This led to a standardization of imagery and themes.

Beginning in the 1930s, as Stalin aimed to modernize the country, posters invoking the future shifted metaphors; while previously, the future was something approaching the country, now the country was represented by a vehicle such as a car, boat, or train, moving itself towards the future. Similarly, time was often portrayed as a race.

The Telegraph Agency of the Soviet Union (TASS) was a "prolific" producer of posters during World War II. The form was used to encourage patriotism and material action such as paying for war bonds. As one person from the Art Institute of Chicago put it, the posters "create a mood of urgency while visually aggrandizing the Soviet soldier, defining the Nazi enemy as vile and subhuman, and emphasizing the woeful suffering of the Soviet people". These posters were also reproduced by the country's allies, including Great Britain, to reinforce the countries' alliances.

With the advent of the Space Race in the 1950s, poster makers drew on space aesthetics and themes to promote government efforts. Details such as the construction of rockets and space suits were often simplified, due to the secretive nature of the space programs.

== Aesthetics ==
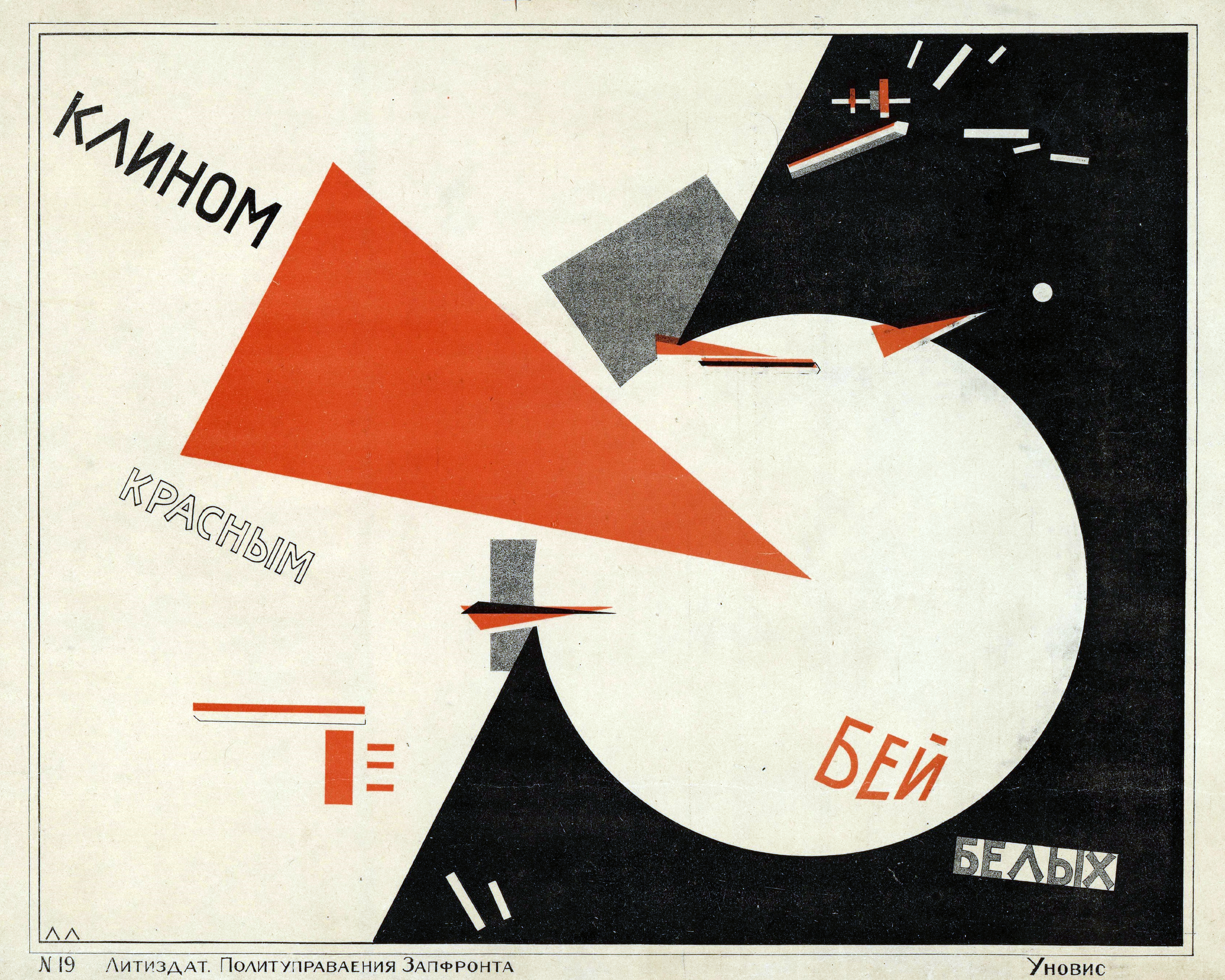
Beat the Whites with the Red Wedge (1919), El Lissitzky

Early posters drew on avant-garde movements (including cubism and futurism), but by the 1920s artists in Moscow and Leningrad had begun to adopt socialist realism. Avant-garde styles continued to be used further afield, such as in the Central Asian cities of Baku and Tashkent.

Art styles varied, with artists often being influenced by traditional art in the region. Posters created in Central Asia in the 1920s, for example, tended to have longer blocks of text and multiple figures, paralleling traditional calligraphy and miniature painting traditions. These influences had somewhat dissipated by the 1930s, when shorter text and larger illustrations became standard.

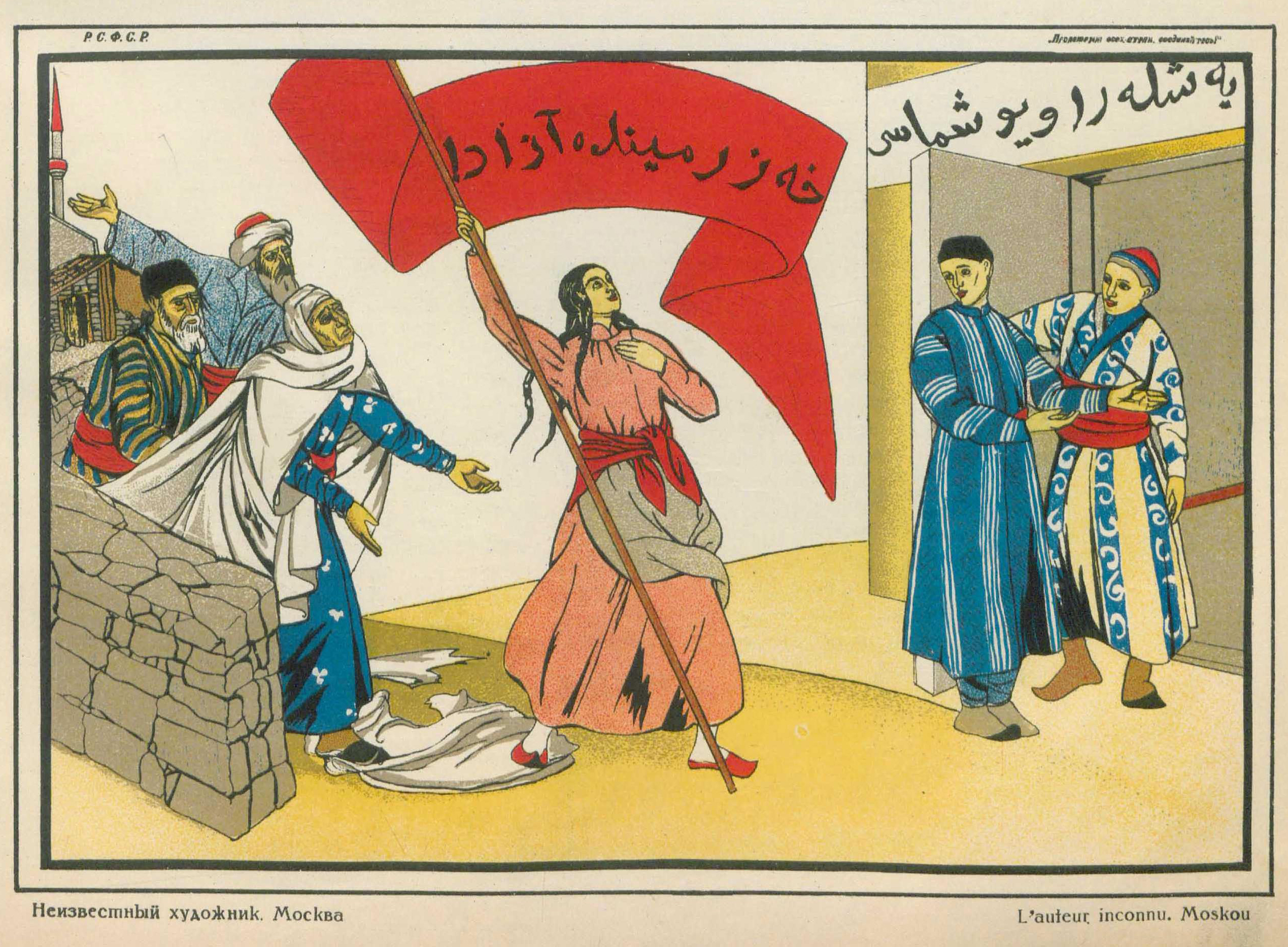
Poster with Arabic script encouraging women to join the Komsomol (issued in Moscow in 1921)

Under socialist realism, a number of stock images were used, including the clean-shaven worker and bearded farmer. Women, men, and children were portrayed as loyal workers who were "steady of gaze and firm of muscle".

Socialist realism became less popular beginning the mid-1950s, hand in hand with other cultural shifts during the Khrushchev Thaw, leading to the increased popularity of humorous images in caricature and cartoon styles. By the 1960s, poster makers were beginning to be influenced by aesthetics and film posters from North America and Western Europe.

Posters used the language spoken in the region they were to be used in, and thus propaganda posters using the Arabic and Latin scripts exist, in addition to Cyrillic. Arabic script in posters had begun to be phased out by the 1930s, as the Soviet government promoted Latin-based scripts for speakers of languages such as Azerbaijani, Kyrgyz, Tajik, Tatar and Uzbek. The Latin-based scripts were subsequently replaced by Cyrillic scripts in the 1940s.
