= Arthurs Point =

Suburb in Queenstown, New Zealand

- Suburb
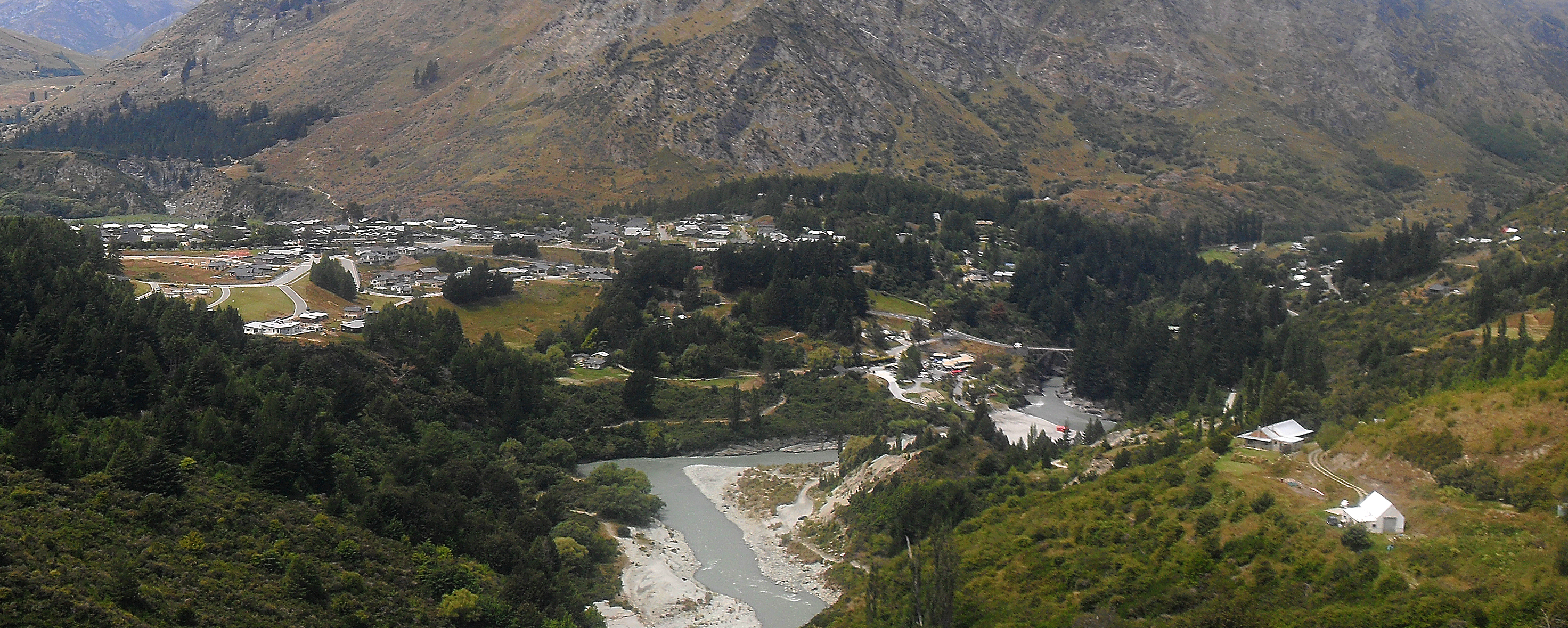
- The suburb of Arthurs Point as viewed from the Moonlight Track.
- Interactive map of Arthurs Point
- Coordinates: 44.988670°S 168.671553°E
- Country: New Zealand
- City: Queenstown
- Local authority: Queenstown-Lakes District Council
- Electoral ward: Arrowtown-Kawarau Ward

Area
  - Land: 418 ha (1,030 acres)

Population (June 2025)
  - Total: 1,470
  - Density: 352/km^{2} (911/sq mi)

	(Mount Dewar)
(Ben Lomond)	Arthurs Point	Dalefield
	Queenstown	(Queenstown Hill)

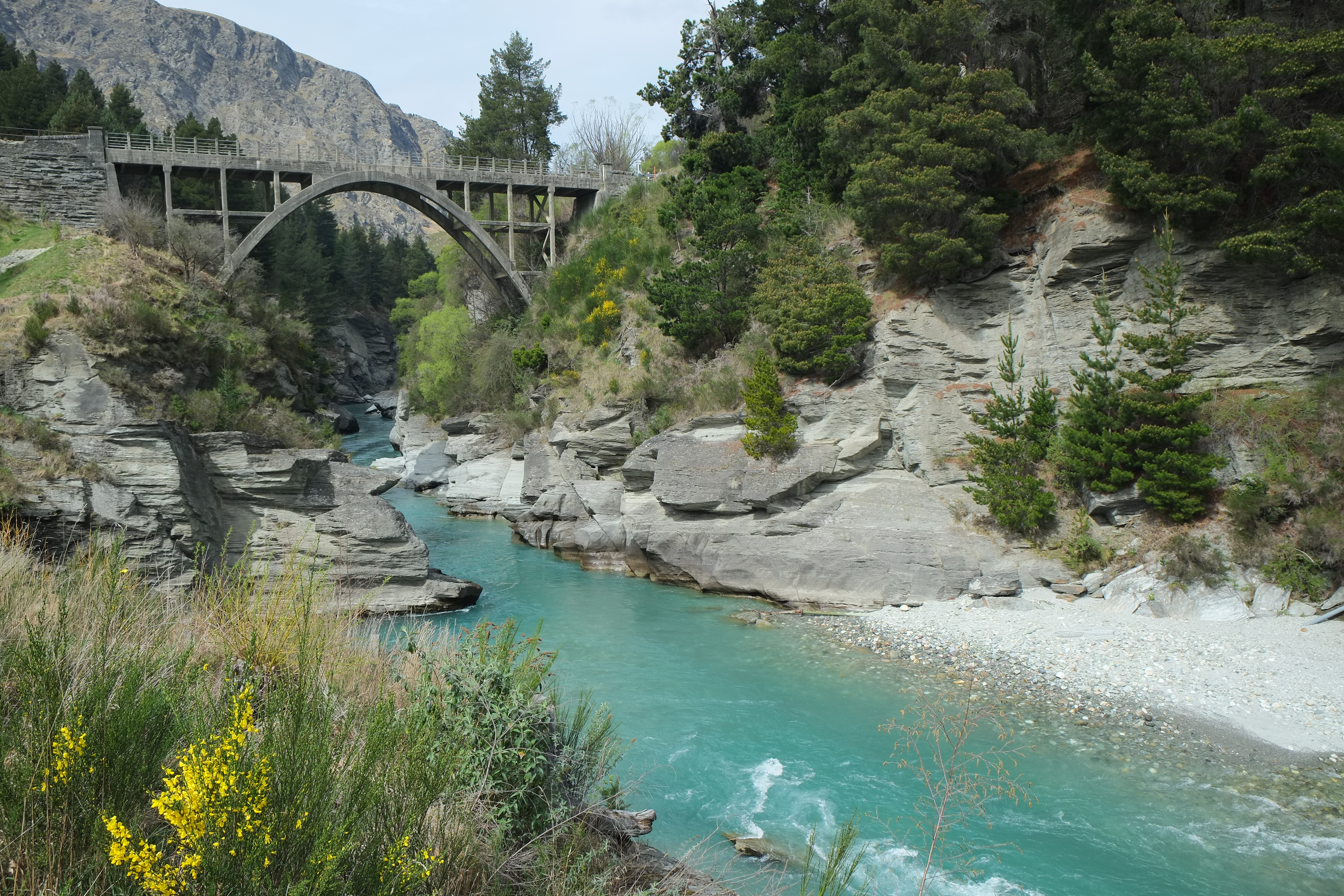
Shotover River and Edith Cavell Bridge at Arthurs Point

Arthurs Point is a suburb of Queenstown in the South Island of New Zealand. It is situated near Queenstown Hill and Bowen Peak and is not far from central Queenstown. Another distinctive aspect for the area is that the Shotover Jet company operates jetboats on the Shotover River which passes under the Edith Cavell Bridge.

== History ==
Arthurs Point was named after Thomas Arthur who, in November 1862, discovered gold in the banks of the nearby Shotover River.

== Demographics ==
Arthurs Point covers 4.18 km^{2} (1.61 sq mi) and had an estimated population of 1,470 as of June 2025, with a population density of 352 people per km^{2}.

Historical population
Year	Pop.	±% p.a.
2006	411	—
2013	807	+10.12%
2018	1,128	+6.93%

Before the 2023 census, Arthurs Point had a larger boundary, covering 5.52 km^{2} (2.13 sq mi). Using that boundary, Arthurs Point had a population of 1,128 at the 2018 New Zealand census, an increase of 321 people (39.8%) since the 2013 census, and an increase of 717 people (174.5%) since the 2006 census. There were 354 households, comprising 546 males and 585 females, giving a sex ratio of 0.93 males per female. The median age was 34.9 years (compared with 37.4 years nationally), with 234 people (20.7%) aged under 15 years, 219 (19.4%) aged 15 to 29, 636 (56.4%) aged 30 to 64, and 39 (3.5%) aged 65 or older.

Ethnicities were 91.0% European/Pākehā, 6.4% Māori, 1.3% Pasifika, 5.9% Asian, and 3.2% other ethnicities. People may identify with more than one ethnicity.

The percentage of people born overseas was 37.5, compared with 27.1% nationally.

Although some people chose not to answer the census's question about religious affiliation, 69.9% had no religion, 21.0% were Christian, 1.6% were Hindu, 1.6% were Buddhist and 1.6% had other religions.

Of those at least 15 years old, 312 (34.9%) people had a bachelor's or higher degree, and 39 (4.4%) people had no formal qualifications. The median income was $47,900, compared with $31,800 nationally. 264 people (29.5%) earned over $70,000 compared to 17.2% nationally. The employment status of those at least 15 was that 654 (73.2%) people were employed full-time, 138 (15.4%) were part-time, and 9 (1.0%) were unemployed.

== Tracks ==
Arthurs Point has access to the moonlight track, a long walking/running track which gives access to Ben Lomond and Moke Lake. The short Oxenbridge Tunnel Track can also be accessed from near the Edith Cavell bridge and displays some of the mining history of the area.
