= Awarua =

Awarua may refer to:

== Places ==
- Awarua, Northland, a community near Tautoro, New Zealand
- Awarua Plains, a large area of wetland in Southland, New Zealand
- Awarua Point, a landform in West Coast, New Zealand

== Other uses ==
- Awarua (gastropod), a genus of gastropods in the family Architectonicidae
- Awarua (electorate), a New Zealand parliamentary electorate, from 1881 to 1996
- Awarua Street railway station, a station on the Johnsonville Branch north of Wellington, New Zealand
- Awarua Radio, a historic coast radio station on the Awarua Plains
- Awarua Satellite Ground Station, a ground station on the Awarua Plains

== See also ==
- Avarua
