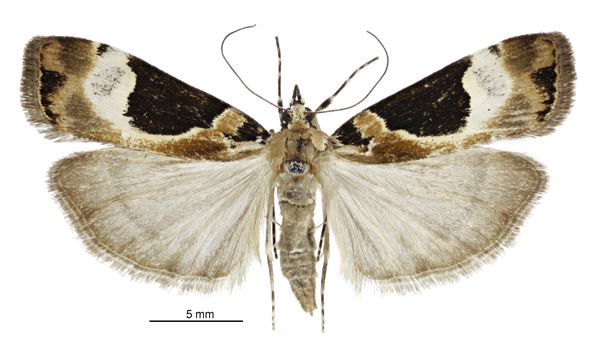
- Female
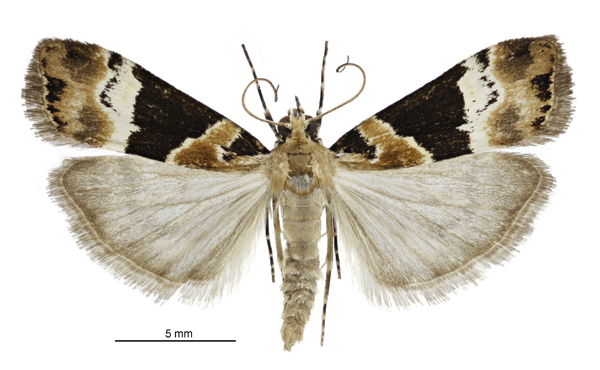
- Male

Scientific classification
- Kingdom: Animalia
- Phylum: Arthropoda
- Clade: Pancrustacea
- Class: Insecta
- Order: Lepidoptera
- Family: Crambidae
- Genus: Eudonia
- Species: E. aspidota

Binomial name
- Eudonia aspidota (Meyrick, 1884)

Synonyms
- Xeroscopa aspidota Meyrick, 1884; Scoparia aspidota (Meyrick, 1884)

= Eudonia aspidota =

Species of moth

Eudonia aspidota is a moth in the family Crambidae. It is found in New Zealand and can be found in the North, South and Stewart Islands. The species inhabits native forest and its larvae lives on mosses.

== Taxonomy ==
This species was first described by Edward Meyrick in 1884 and named Xeroscopa aspidota. Meyrick added further detail when he described the species in 1885. In 1913 Meyrick placed the species within the genus Scoparia. George Hudson described and illustrated this species in the book The butterflies and moths of New Zealand. In 1988 John S. Dugdale placed this species in the genus Eudonia. The male lectotype, collected at Ben Lomond by Meyrick, is held at the Natural History Museum, London.

== Description ==
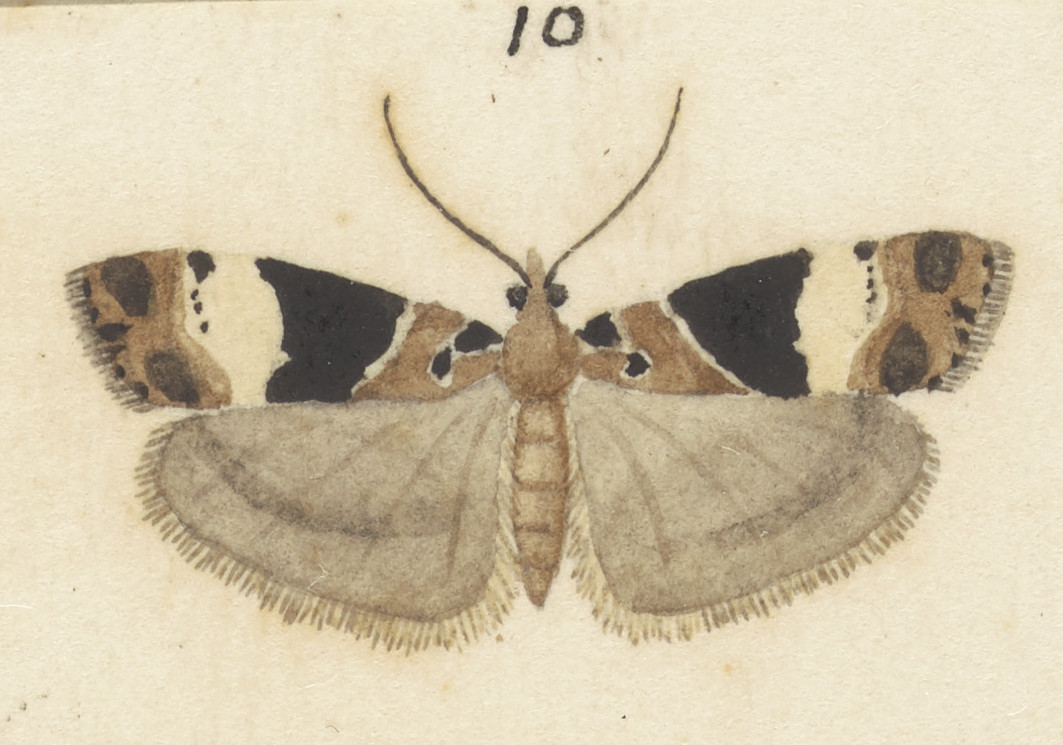
Illustration by George Hudson.

The wingspan is 22–26 mm. The forewings are light ochreous, sometimes mixed with reddish-ochreous. There is a black white-margined triangular spot on the costa. The hindwings are pale grey with a darker grey post medial and hind marginal line.

Although the wing markings of this species attract attention, they also imitate bird droppings. This mimicry offers protection to E. aspidota when it is not in flight.

== Distribution ==
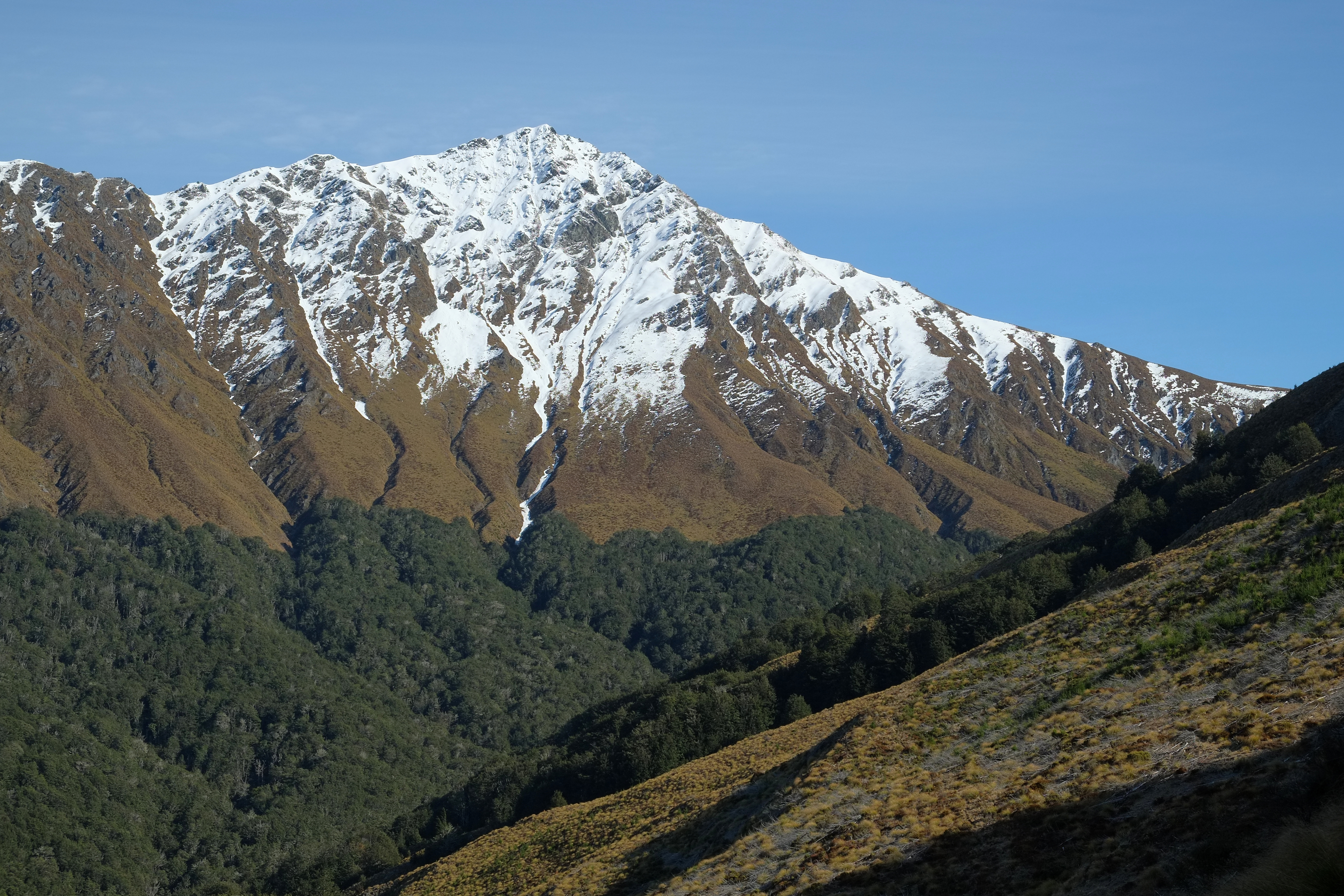
Ben Lomond, type locality of this species.

E. aspidota is endemic in New Zealand. Meyrick stated it could be found in Wellington, Castle Hill, Mount Hutt, Dunedin and Lake Wakatipu. George Hudson added to the localities where E. aspidota could be found and included Raurimu, Waimarino, Buller River, Invercargill and Stewart Island. Hudson was of the opinion that the species was probably distributed throughout New Zealand.

== Habitat and hosts ==
The habitat of this species is amongst forest. The larval host plants of this species are mosses.

== Behaviour ==
Adults of E. aspidota are normally present during December and January. This species is attracted to light and have been collected via a mercury vapour light trap.
