= Southern Positioning Augmentation Network =

Satellite based augmentation system in Australasia

The Southern Positioning Augmentation Network (SouthPAN) is a joint initiative of the Australian and New Zealand Governments that provides satellite-based augmentation system (SBAS) for Australia and New Zealand. On 26 September 2022, SouthPAN early Open Services became live, with safety-of-life certified SouthPAN services planned for 2028. SouthPAN is the first SBAS in the Southern Hemisphere.

SouthPAN will implement the following services:

- L1 SBAS. L1 SBAS augments GPS and is an Aeronautical Radio Navigation Service (ARNS). This signal will be used for Safety-of-Life applications and therefore needs to be certified by the National Aviation Authorities—that is, the Australian Civil Aviation Safety Authority (CASA) and New Zealand Civil Aviation Authority (CAA).
- DFMC SBAS. Dual Frequency Multi Constellation (DFMC) SBAS is a future ARNS that will be defined in ICAO Annex 10 Amendment 93. This service will have the potential to be certified as a safety critical system for aviation and other sectors in the future.
- PVS. Precise Point Positioning (PPP) via SouthPAN (PVS) service will provide horizontal accuracies of 15 cm (5.9 in) (95% confidence) to a range of industries following a convergence time in the tens of minutes. The PVS service will be open access and able to be incorporated onto mass-market GNSS devices across Australia, New Zealand and their maritime zones.

== Development ==
Between 2017 and 31 July 2020, Geoscience Australia ran a SouthPAN SBAS test-bed project to assess the economic, social and environmental benefits of improved positioning technology through industry case study projects. Lockheed Martin Australia won a tender for the AU$1.18 billion dollar contract in September 2022. The system is based on ground stations built by Lockheed Martin's subcontractor Av-Comm, with the site in Uralla, New South Wales, switched on in December 2023, and the site in Awarua—based at the Awarua Satellite Ground Station—in July 2024. One expected outcome of greater GPS precision is reduced flight cancellations.
