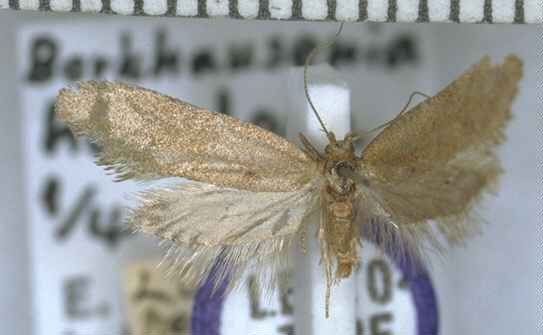
- Male lectotype

Scientific classification
- Kingdom: Animalia
- Phylum: Arthropoda
- Class: Insecta
- Order: Lepidoptera
- Family: Oecophoridae
- Genus: Tingena
- Species: T. homodoxa

Binomial name
- Tingena homodoxa (Meyrick, 1883)

Synonyms
- Oecophora homodoxa Meyrick, 1883; Borkhausenia homodoxa (Meyrick, 1883)

= Tingena homodoxa =

Species of moth, endemic to New Zealand

Tingena homodoxa is a species of moth in the family Oecophoridae. It is endemic to New Zealand and is found in the southern parts of the South Island. It inhabits open grassy slopes and is on the wing from November until January.

== Taxonomy ==
This species was first described by Edward Meyrick in 1883 using specimens he collected near Lake Wakatipu in December. He originally named the species Oecophora homodoxa. Meyrick went on to give a fuller description of the species in 1884. In 1915 Meyrick placed this species within the Borkhausenia genus. In 1926 Alfred Philpott studied the genitalia of the male of this species. George Hudson discussed and illustrated this species under the name B. homodoxa in his 1928 publication The butterflies and moths of New Zealand. In 1988 J. S. Dugdale placed this species in the genus Tingena. The male lectotype, is held at the Natural History Museum, London.

== Description ==
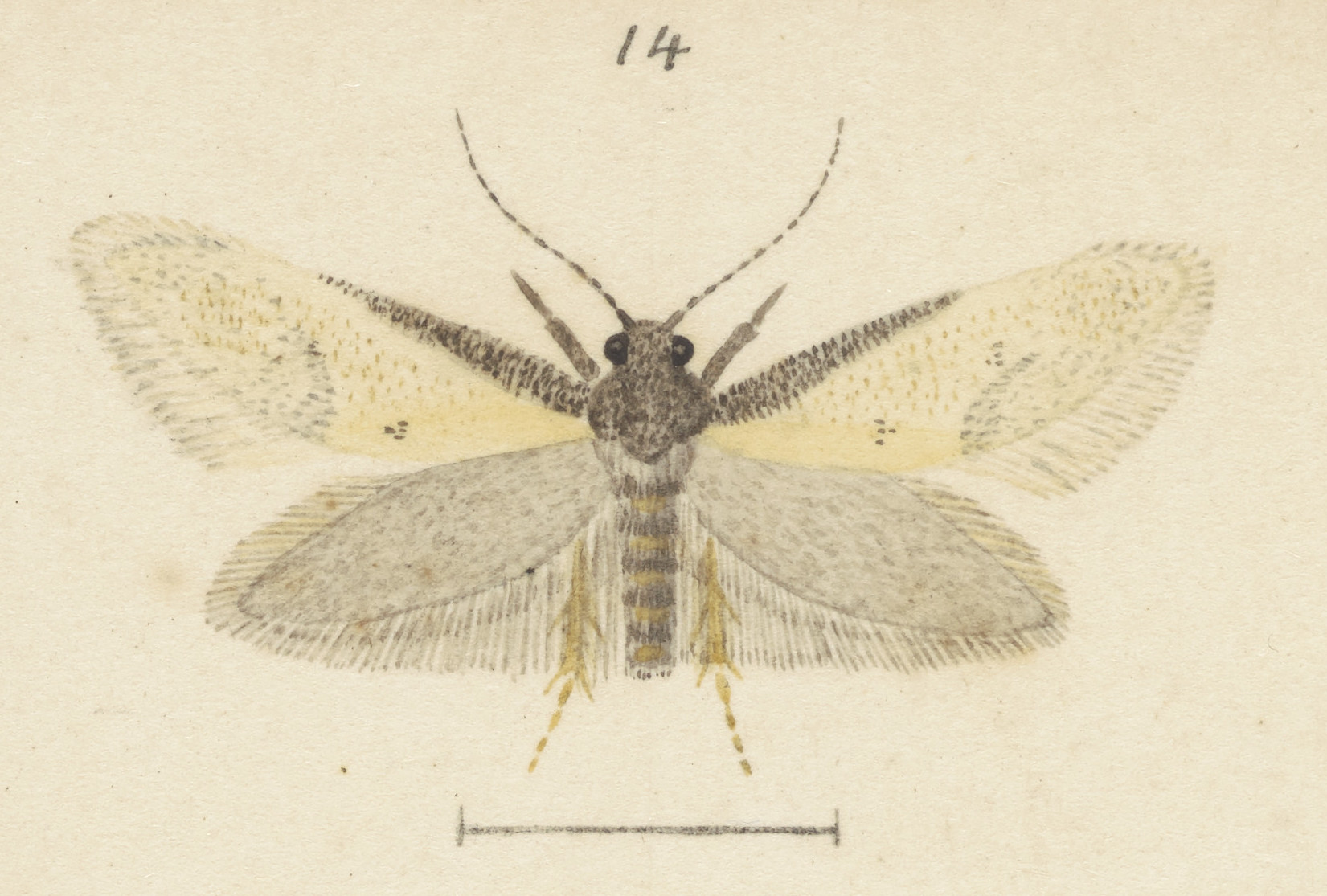
Illustration of T. homodoxa by George Hudson.

Meyrick originally described this species as follows:

Fore wings whitish-grey, closely irrorated with darker, a mark on fold and another on anal angle hardly darker; hind wings grey.

Meyrick in 1884 described this species as follows:

Male, female. — 15 1/2-17 1/2- mm. Head, palpi, thorax, and legs light grey finely irrorated with dark fuscous. Antennae dark fuscous. Abdomen light grey. Forewings elongate, costa moderately arched, apex pointed, hindmargin very oblique, hardly rounded; pale whitish-grey, very finely and closely irrorated with dark fuscous-grey; indications of an inwardly oblique dark fuscous mark beneath fold about 1/3, and a perpendicular mark on anal angle, both almost obsolete : cilia grey-whitish, with several rows of dark fuscous-grey points. Hindwings grey, in female rather darker; cilia light grey, with a cloudy darker basal line.

== Distribution ==
This species is endemic to New Zealand and has been found on the lower slopes of Mount Aurum near Lake Wakatipu as well as at Ben Lomond.

== Behaviour ==
The adults of this species are on the wing from November until January.

== Habitat ==
This species inhabits open grassy slopes at altitudes of around 3000 ft.
