= Queenstown Police Station =

New Zealand police station

Coordinates: 45.03207°S 168.66308°E

Queenstown Police Station is the largest police station in the Otago Lakes Central Area which is one of three policing areas in the Southern District of the New Zealand Police. The Otago Lakes Central Area headquarters has returned to Queenstown Police Station after a period at Alexandra Police Station. The area of responsibility covered by the Queenstown Police extends from Kingston in the south, to the Crown Range summit in the north, and from Glenorchy and its environs in the west, to the Roaring Meg power station in the Kawarau Gorge in the east.

== History ==
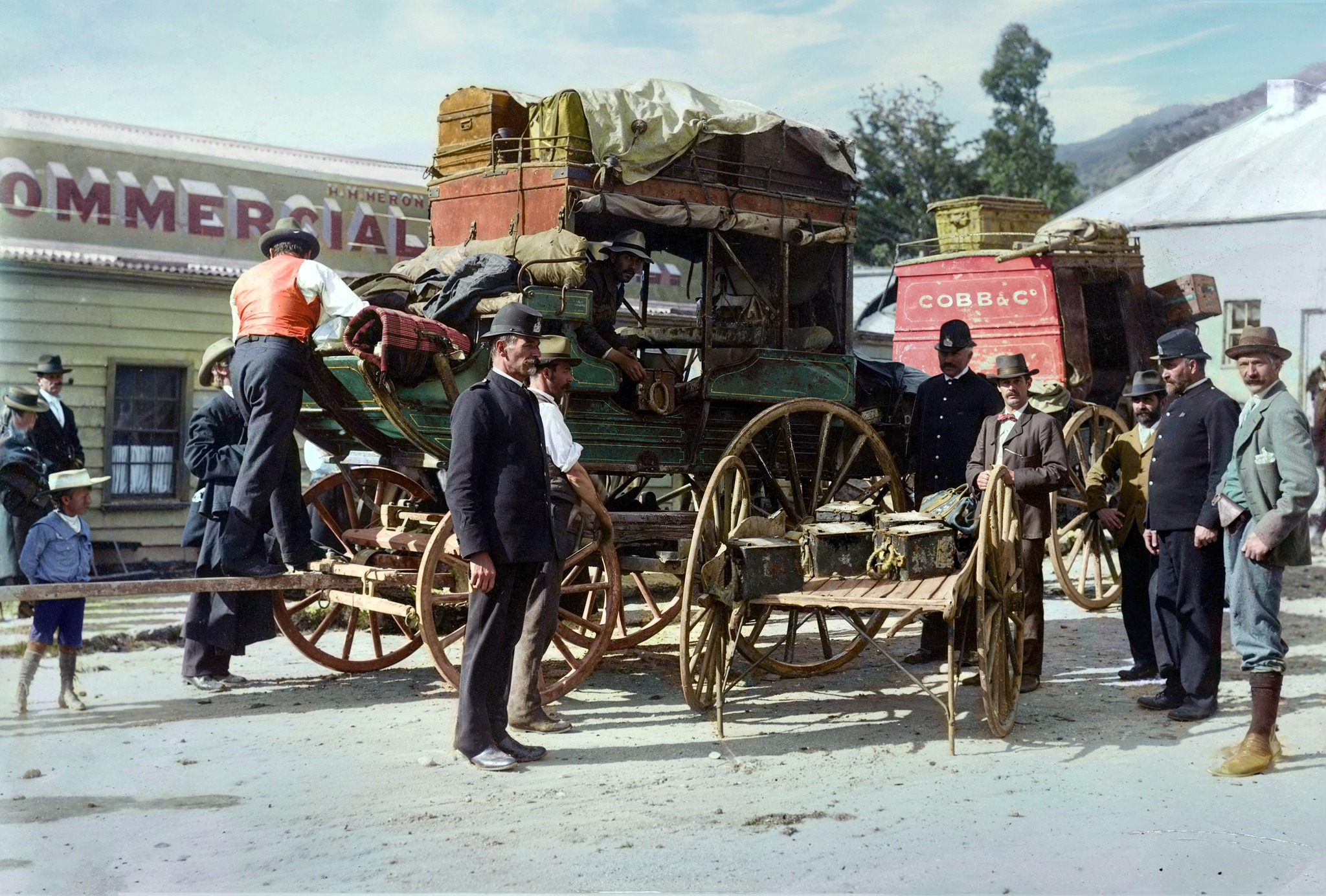
The last Central Otago gold escort, changing horses at Roxburgh

The police station site has been used since gold was found nearby in Arrowtown and on the banks of the Shotover River in 1862. The adjacent historic Court House was built between 1875 and 1877 after operating out of tents. The police station is at 11 Camp Street, and Queenstown was known as 'the Camp'.

The station opened in November 1862. By March 1863 more than 1000 people lived in the town and the police force consisted of an Officer, a Foot Sergeant, a Mounted Constable, eight Foot Constables, a Detective and four horses. There were also police officers at Arrowtown (7), Frankton (1), Arthurs Point (2) and Maori Point (1). The Gold Escort was distinct from the police; contracted to Cobb and Co. Near Skippers and along the Shotover, branch escorts transported prisoners who were shackled to posts halfway along. The escort troopers were armed with carbines and swords. The Otago Daily Times reported that robberies were numerous and frequent drunkenness prevalent, with pick-pocketing complaints common. Claim jumping and stick-ups were also common. In 1867 there were police stations at Queenstown, Arrowtown, Frankton, Skipper's, Maori Point, Nevis, Nokomai and Cardrona.

Almost daily practically all the police staff at Queenstown Station travelled to Frankton where the first court sat in McBride Street. The courthouse later became the Presbyterian church.

=== First buildings ===
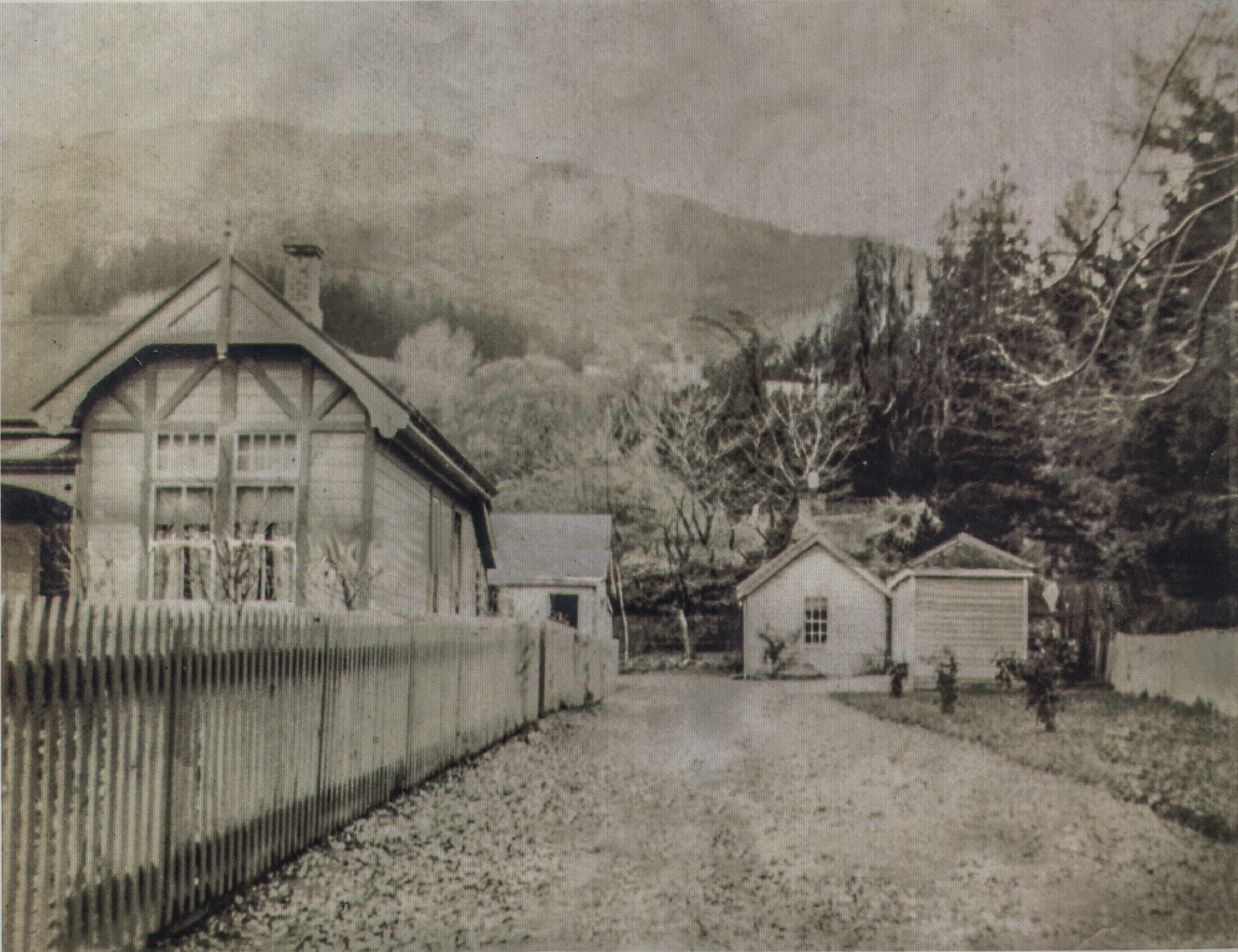
An historic photo of Queenstown Police Station. The wooden picket fence remained into the 1990s, and the stone bridge can still be seen today.

The original police station in Queenstown can be seen at the same site in early photographs with a stable, small cell, and house alongside. The stone bridge at the Hotop's Rise end of the station grounds was built by prisoners.

In July 1960, with the closure of the Arrowtown station, Constable Leo Daly took charge of Queenstown station and renovations were made. The police house was beside the station.

By 1998 the police station included the former police house and was home to a senior sergeant, a detective sergeant and two detectives, fifteen constables, two sergeants, a community constable, a watchhouse keeper, and three non-sworn staff. The station was cramped with one room doubling as interview room, breath testing room, and exhibit office.

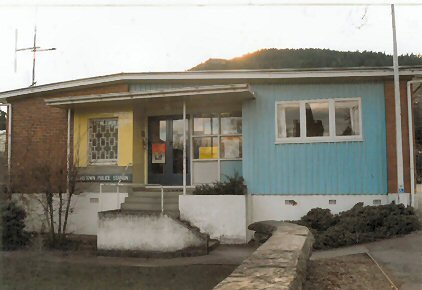
Queenstown Police Station in 1997

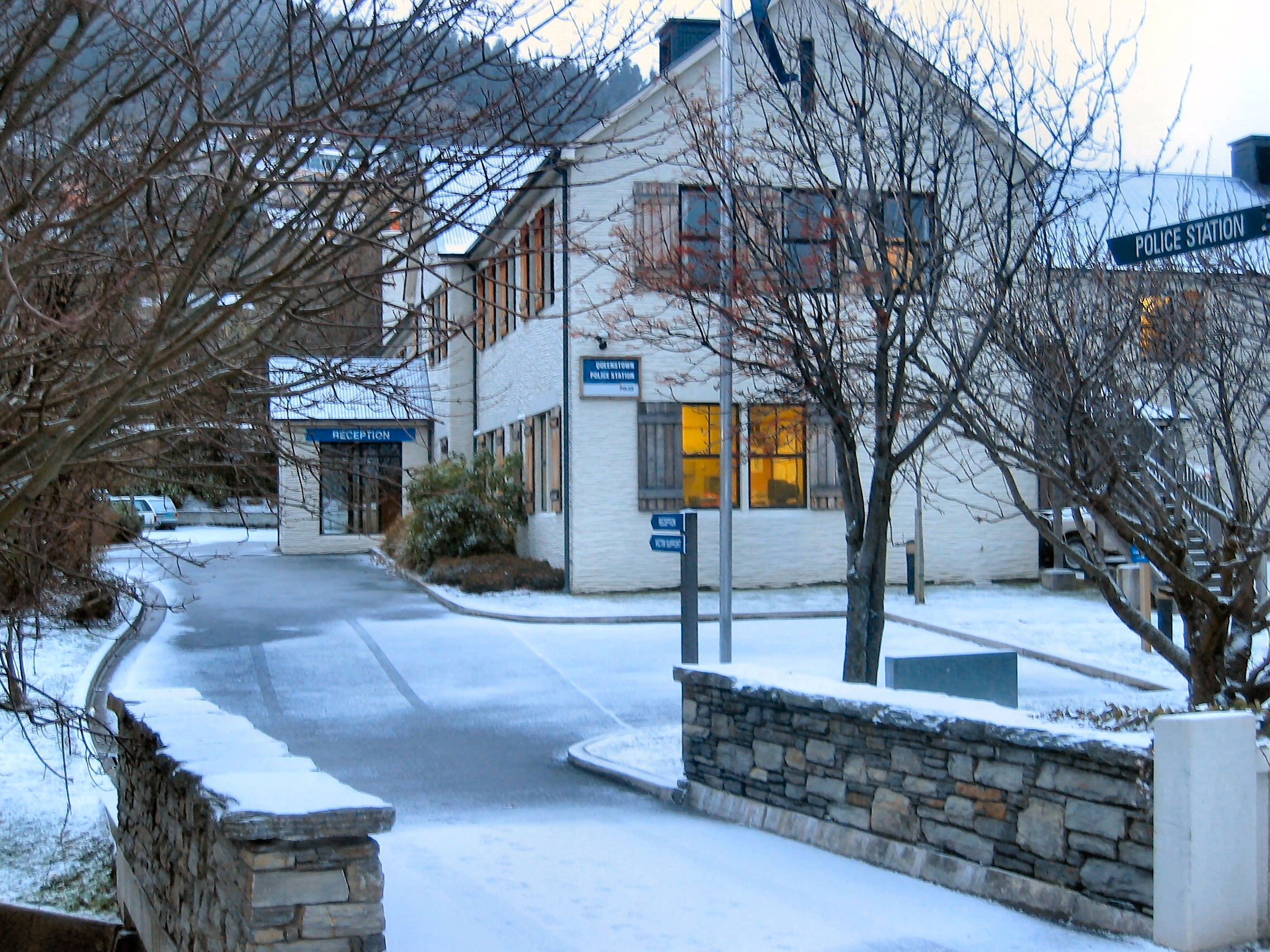
New Zealand Queenstown Police Station in 2004.

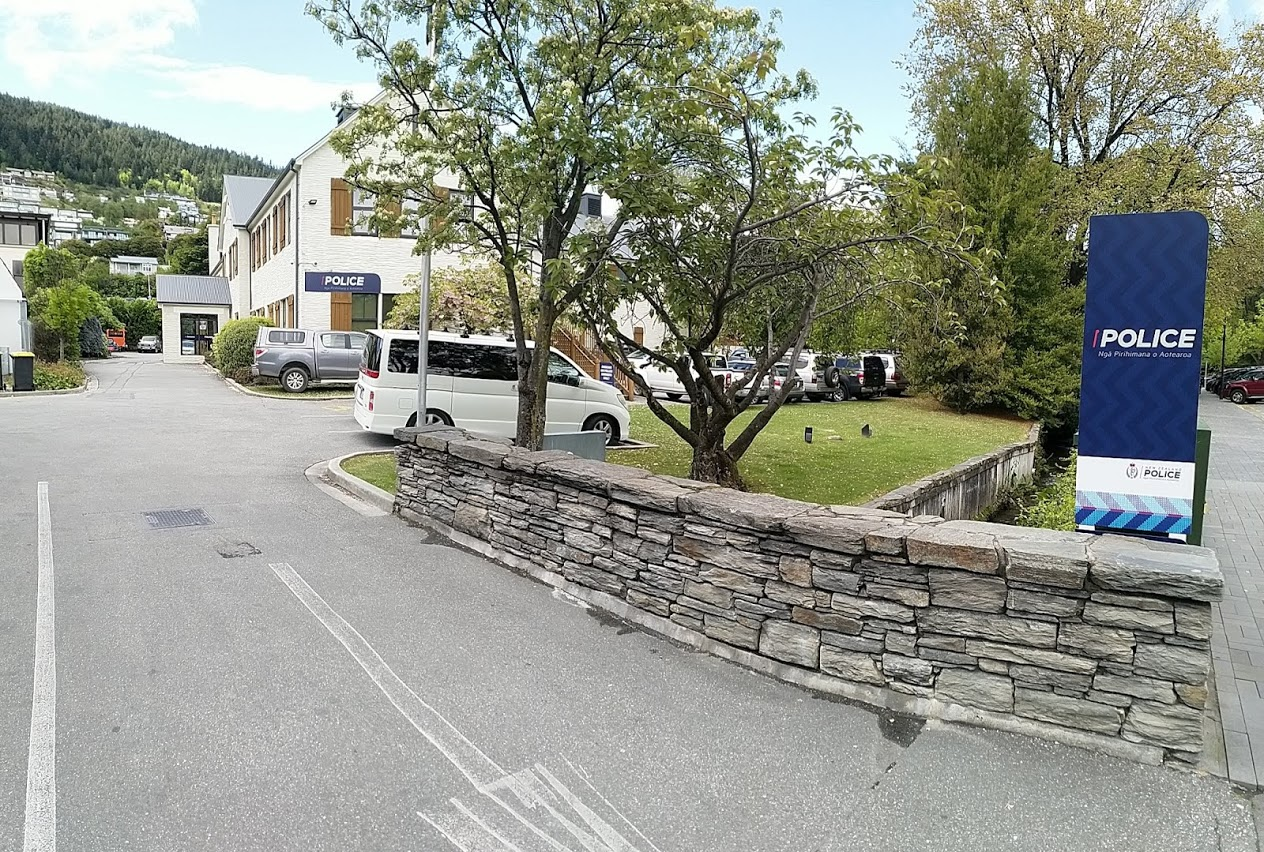
Queenstown Police Station in 2018

=== New building ===
The current police station was designed by architects Mason and Wales and opened on Friday 10 July 1998 by Hon. Jack Elder, minister of police. It was built by Amalgamated Builders at a cost of $2.3 million. The exterior is modelled to suit the historic precinct where it is situated. The land is owned by Māori tribe Ngāi Tahu.

== Staff ==
The station is staffed over three rotating shifts by five sections each composed of one sergeant and one to three constables. In addition to this are:

- An Inspector in charge of the Otago Lakes Central Area, ("Area Commander").
- A Senior Sergeant in charge of crime prevention for the Otago Lakes Central Area, ("Area Prevention Manager").
- A Senior Sergeant, in charge of response for the Queenstown area, ("Response Manager")
- A prevention sergeant, also responsible for the coordination of family violence offending, at the rank of Sergeant.
- A community constable/prevention officer at the rank of Constable.
- A police prosecutor, at the rank of Sergeant, and a prosecutions assistant.
- A youth aid officer, at the rank of Constable.
- A Detective Senior Sergeant in charge of criminal investigations in the Otago Lakes Central Area.
- A Detective Sergeant and four Detectives.
- A field intelligence officer at the rank of Constable.
- A Senior Sergeant in charge of road policing for the Otago Lakes Central Area.
- A Sergeant in charge of road policing for the Queenstown area.
- Eight road policing Constables.
- An information technology engineer for the Otago Lakes Central Area.
- Three watch house officers and a station support officer.
- An area executive officer.
- A Sergeant and six Constables are based at the Queenstown Airport, working at the airport, on the roads near the airport, and when the airport closes continuing their shift in Queenstown. Airport staff numbers were increased slightly when night flights began at the airport.

=== Notable police officers ===
==== Sergeant Major Hugh William Bracken ====
In 1862, Irishman Sergeant Major Hugh William Bracken arrived in Arrowtown as part of the Otago Mounted Police. Bracken had fought in the Crimean War for the British Army's 5th Inniskilling Dragoons so was no stranger to battle, conquest and resolution. A Protestant and a loyalist, his imposing frame and immense power proved priceless in the rugged, untouched wilderness of Central Otago. He gave up his position with the police to partner William Rees running the Queen's Arms Hotel, later – as Bracken did most of the work – it became known as "Bracken's". Hugh Bracken was instrumental in forming Queenstown in 1863 and 4. He superintended the nightwatch, and would often patrol at night with his revolver. He was elected to the Queenstown Improvement Committee, and helped to fundraise for a hospital. He helped found the Masonic Lodge and the Jockey Club. At the end of 1864 he sold Bracken's hotel to Captain Albert Eichardt This hotel is now Eichardt's, a Queenstown landmark. Bracken moved to Hokitika, following the gold rush with his brother, where they set up hotels there and in Greymouth. Two years later they returned to Australia and following their mother's death in Ireland a year later, Hugh returned home to County Fermanagh where he married and had three children.

==== St. John Branigan ====
Mr. Commissioner St. John Branigan was in charge of the Otago police. He came to Queenstown early in 1863 to organise the receiving of the gold and the protection of the gold escort. Prior to serving in the Victorian Mounted Police, he had taken part in the Kaffir Wars of 1850-1852 with the Cape Police. His office was a tent with a board for a table, and he had no scales. Until this point miners had been keeping large sums of money in gin boxes or other insecure places. Some would come to leave their cash with Bracken at the Queen's Arms Hotel. Major Richardson at the Arrow heard of one calico tent with over £100,000 in saddlebags on the floor, guarded by one cook. The township of Kingston was formerly known as 'St. John's', named after Branigan.

==== Sergeant McKenzie ====
The sergeant in charge of the Queenstown Police Station in 1900, Sergeant McKenzie was possibly the first to raise objections about liquor licensing. He was described at the time as an alert and circumspect officer, who has done much good service in his present capacity . In June 1900 he opposed the granting of 11.00pm licences on the grounds that; 'it is not to be tolerated that tourists landing at Queenstown at 10 o'clock, or later, should find the hotels in semi-darkness, and the whole town on a night footing. This is evidently out of the question. In the second place the tighter restrictions are drawn the greater will be the attempt to evade them. Such a step would mean the creation of irksome trouble for the police, the courts, and publicans and sinners all round. Fortunately the time is not yet.'

== Media presence ==
Queenstown police were the first to use Facebook to identify and apprehend an offender. In January 2009 Michael James Ede and another man were charged, after Ede bungled a burglary. He removed his balaclava after becoming too hot, while trying to cut into a safe with an angle grinder. The video of the burglary was uploaded to Facebook and he was identified soon afterwards. The Queenstown Police Facebook fan page reached a peak of around 7,000 fans and was replicated around New Zealand. In mid 2016 the site was absorbed into the Southern District police Facebook page. Each District now has its own Facebook page, and other pages have been amalgamated into these.

The crime drama series A Remarkable Place to Die is located here.
