= Richard Dowden (scientist) =

Australian-born New Zealand physicist (1932–2016)

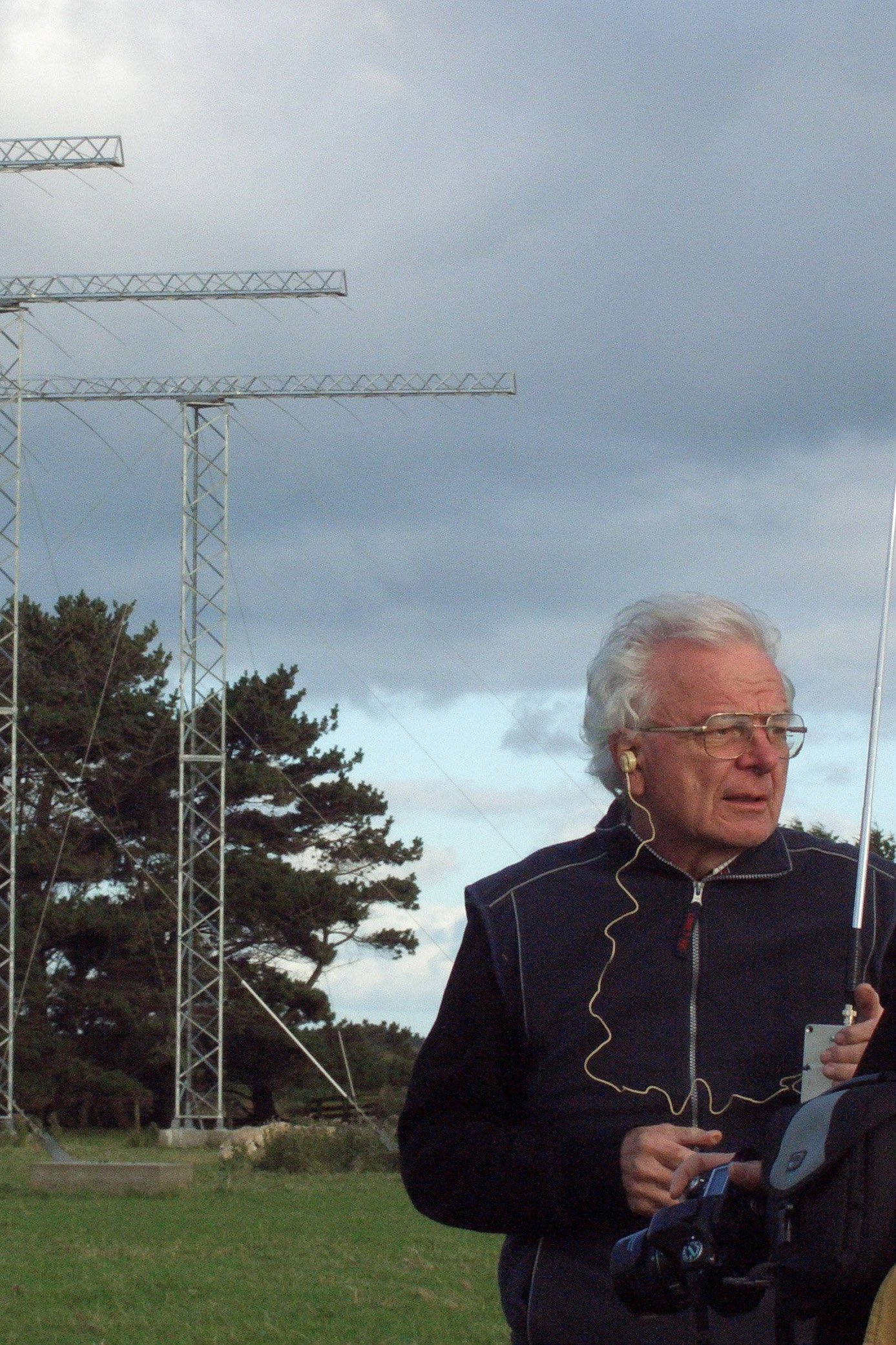
Dowden at Unwin Radar, 2009

Richard Lindsay Dowden (1932–2016), sometimes known as Dick Dowden, was an Australian-born New Zealand-resident scientist and researcher, and a recognised authority within the fields of geo- and astrophysics.

== Biography ==
Dowden was born in Boorowa, New South Wales in 1932 and grew up in Sydney. He married occupational therapist Eleanor Widdicombe in 1959 and the couple and their large family lived in Hobart and Dunedin, residing at Linden in the latter city.

== Education ==
Dowden was educated at Saint Ignatius' College, Riverview and later studied science at the University of Sydney, graduating with a Bachelor of Science Honours degree in 1955. He subsequently undertook research studies with the University of Tasmania, graduating with a Master of Science in 1959, a PhD in 1965, and a Doctor of Science in 1975.

== Career ==
Dowden served as a scientist with the Radiophysics Division of the CSIRO, as a scientist on Macquarie Island, and as a scientist with the Ionic Prediction Service in Hobart. He served as an academic with the University of Tasmania and Otago University (1966-1998), where he was appointed Beverly Professor of Physics. In the course of his career, Dowden made numerous research journeys to both the Arctic and Antarctic regions.

The research from Dowden was extensive. Areas of research included electromagnetic theory and detection techniques, the polarity and longitude of the dipole axis of Jupiter, very low frequency emissions, the dynamic spectral shape of electrons in electromagnetic radiation, high frequency ionospheric sounders; very low frequency modulation of the auroral electrojet; detection and interpretation of red sprites; invention of the dynagraph; and Jupiter polarmetrics.

Dowden authored or co-authored some 119 scientific monographs.

== Recognition ==
The work of Richard Dowden was recognised with the awards of the Mechaelis Medal, the Sidey Medal, and the Australian Antarctic Division Medal. Dowden was made a Fellow of the New Zealand Institute of Physics, a Fellow of the Royal Society of New Zealand, and a Fellow of the American Geophysical Union. The Otago Daily Times, in its obituary for Dowden, described him as an "award-winning researcher" and an "influential teacher".
