= Dhargyey Buddhist Centre =

Buddhist centre and historic house in Dunedin, New Zealand

- །ཐུབ་བསྟན་བཤད་སྒྲུབ་དར་རྒྱས་གླིང་། ། Thuptän Shädrub Dhargyey Ling (Standard Tibetan)
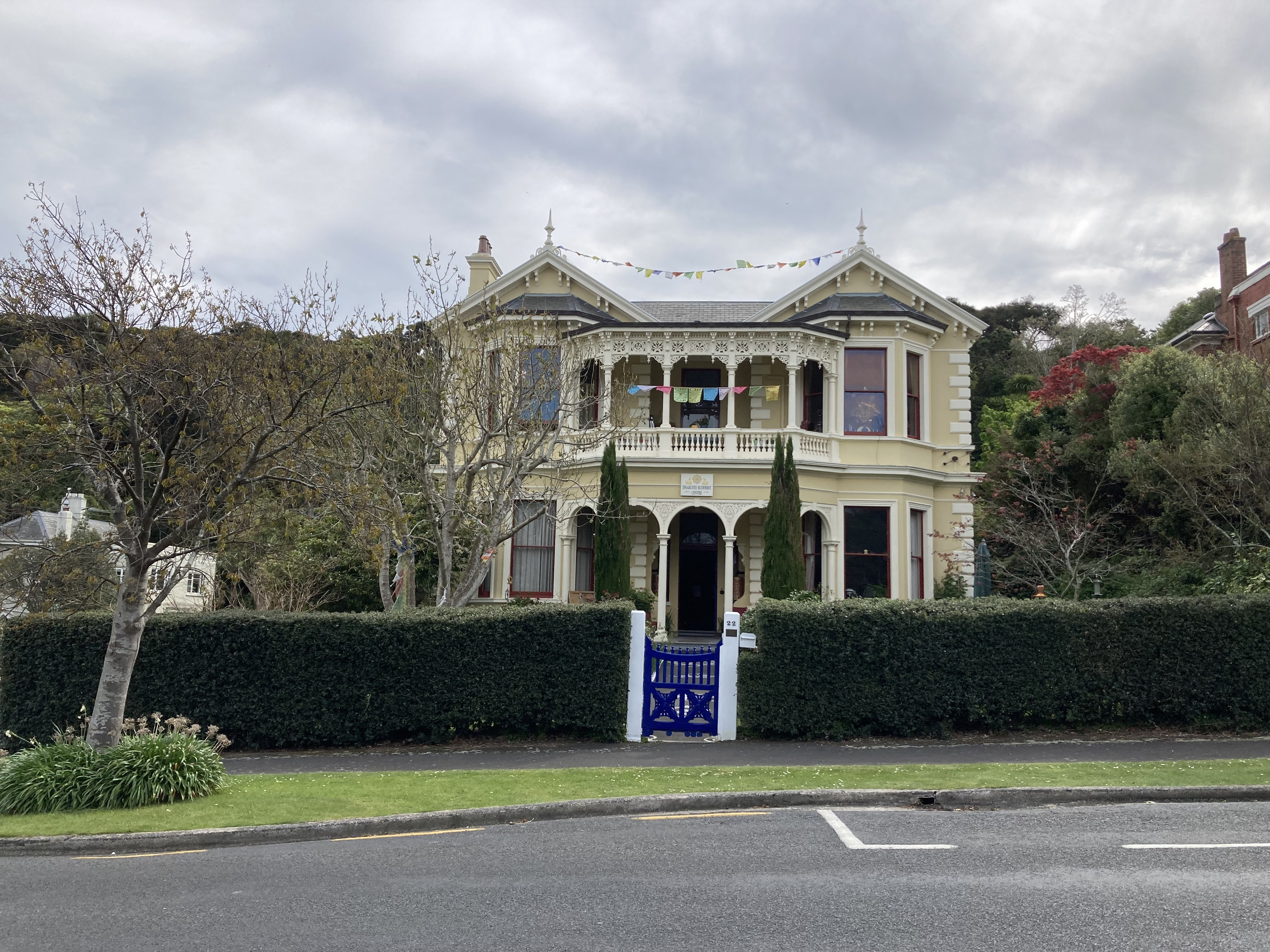
- Dhargyey Buddhist Centre in Royal Terrace, Dunedin
- Interactive map of the Dhargyey Buddhist Centre area
- Alternative names: Linden

General information
- Type: residential
- Architectural style: Victorian
- Location: Royal Terrace, Dunedin, 22 Royal Terrace
- Coordinates: 45°52′05″S 170°30′06″E
- Construction started: 1878
- Completed: April 1879
- Client: Jacob Isaac

Technical details
- Structural system: triple brick exterior walls, plastered. Double brick interior walls. Slate roof.

Design and construction
- Architect: probably Nathaniel Wales
- Architecture firm: Mason and Wales

Heritage New Zealand – Category 1
- Designated: 27 July 1988
- Reference no.: 4768

Dhargyey Buddhist Centre is the headquarters of the Buddhist community in Dunedin, New Zealand, based at Linden, a Heritage New Zealand Pouhere Taonga category 1 historic place.

== Linden ==
Linden, at 22 Royal Terrace, is a historic house in the city's Royal Terrace-Pitt Street-Heriot Row Residential Heritage Precinct which also includes Olveston. It was built in 1879 for Jacob Isaac, a merchant associated with the New Zealand clothing company Hallensteins, and was built by architectural partnership Mason & Wales, probably to a design by Nathaniel Wales.

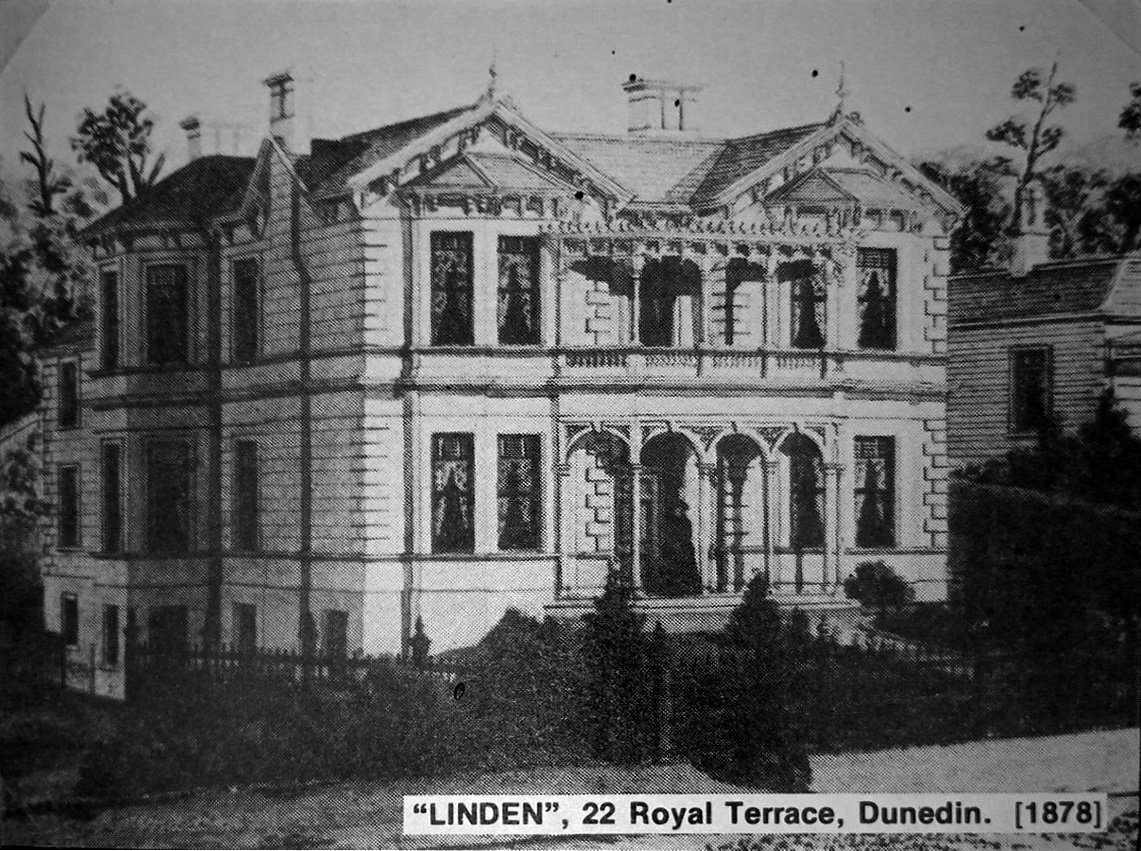
An isometric architect's drawing of 'Linden' house

The house was later owned by food manufacturer Richard Hudson, who established the city's chocolate factory. Hudson's widow Mary lived in the house until 1937, after which it became a boarding house until 1976, when it was bought and restored by Eleanor and Richard Dowden as a family home.

The Buddhist community replaced the roof with new slate in 2016, assisted by funding from New Zealand Lottery Grants Board, Otago Community Trust and the city council's heritage fund.

The building is subject to damp from having had a nearby street backfilled against the basement wall.

In 1988, Linden was listed as a Category 1 Historic Place by the New Zealand Historic Places Trust (now Heritage New Zealand Pouhere Taonga). It is noted by the organisation for its historical significance due to its connection with Hudson, and architectural and townscape significance as a largely unmodified grand Victorian house within a precinct of similar notable structures.

== Buddhist centre ==
The Dhargyey Buddhist Centre was founded in 1984 as a Buddhist teaching centre for the Venerable Geshe Ngawang Dhargyey.

The Buddhist community bought Linden house in 1986.

The centre describes its main function as "to encourage harmony and unity through the sharing of Buddhist philosophy".

The Dalai Lama visited the Dhargyey Buddhist Centre in 1996 and in 2013; on the second visit he suggested the centre could convey Buddhist concepts of self-help and science of mind, to the wider community.

The centre marked the Dalai Lama's 90th birthday in 2025.

== Stupa ==
A stupa commemorating Geshe Dhargyey, built and maintained by the Dhargyey Buddhist Centre, overlooks Portobello on Otago Peninsula near Dunedin.
