= Shotover River =

Coordinates: 44.807949°S 168.736278°E

Shotover River Kimiākau
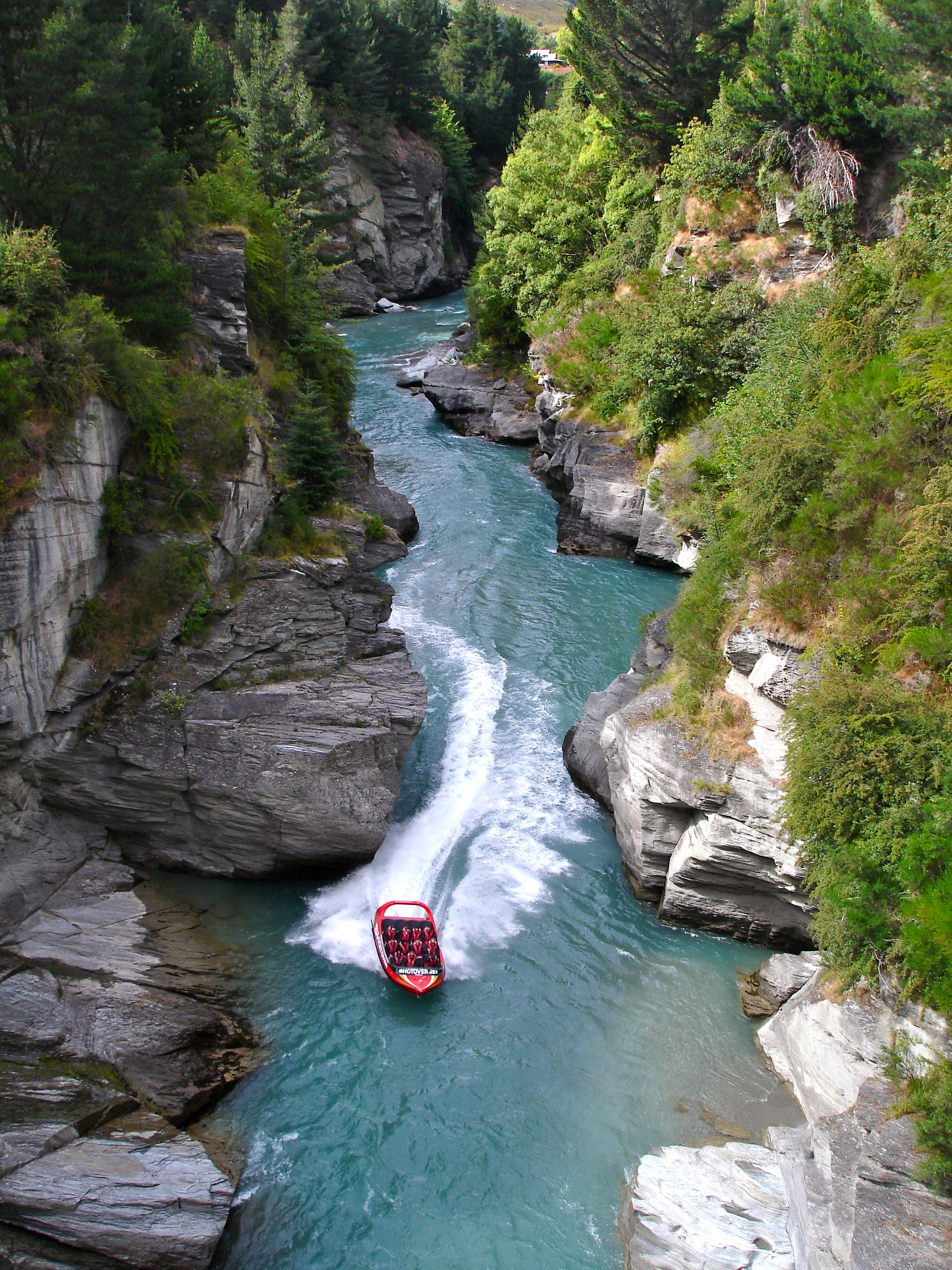
- Jet boating the Shotover River canyons
- Etymology: After Shotover Park in Oxfordshire.
- Native name: Kimiākau (Māori)

Location
- Country: New Zealand

Physical characteristics
- Mouth
  - location: Kawarau River
  - elevation: 290 m (950 ft)
- Length: 75 km (47 mi)

The Shotover Jet

The Shotover River (Māori: Kimiākau) is located in the Otago region of the South Island of New Zealand. The name correctly suggests that this 75-kilometre (47 mi) long river is fast flowing, with numerous rapids. The river flows generally south from the Southern Alps on its journey running through the Skippers Canyon, draining the area between the Richardson Mountains and the Harris Mountains, before flowing into the Kawarau River east of Queenstown.

The Edith Cavell bridge crosses the river at Arthurs Point.

== Tourist operations ==
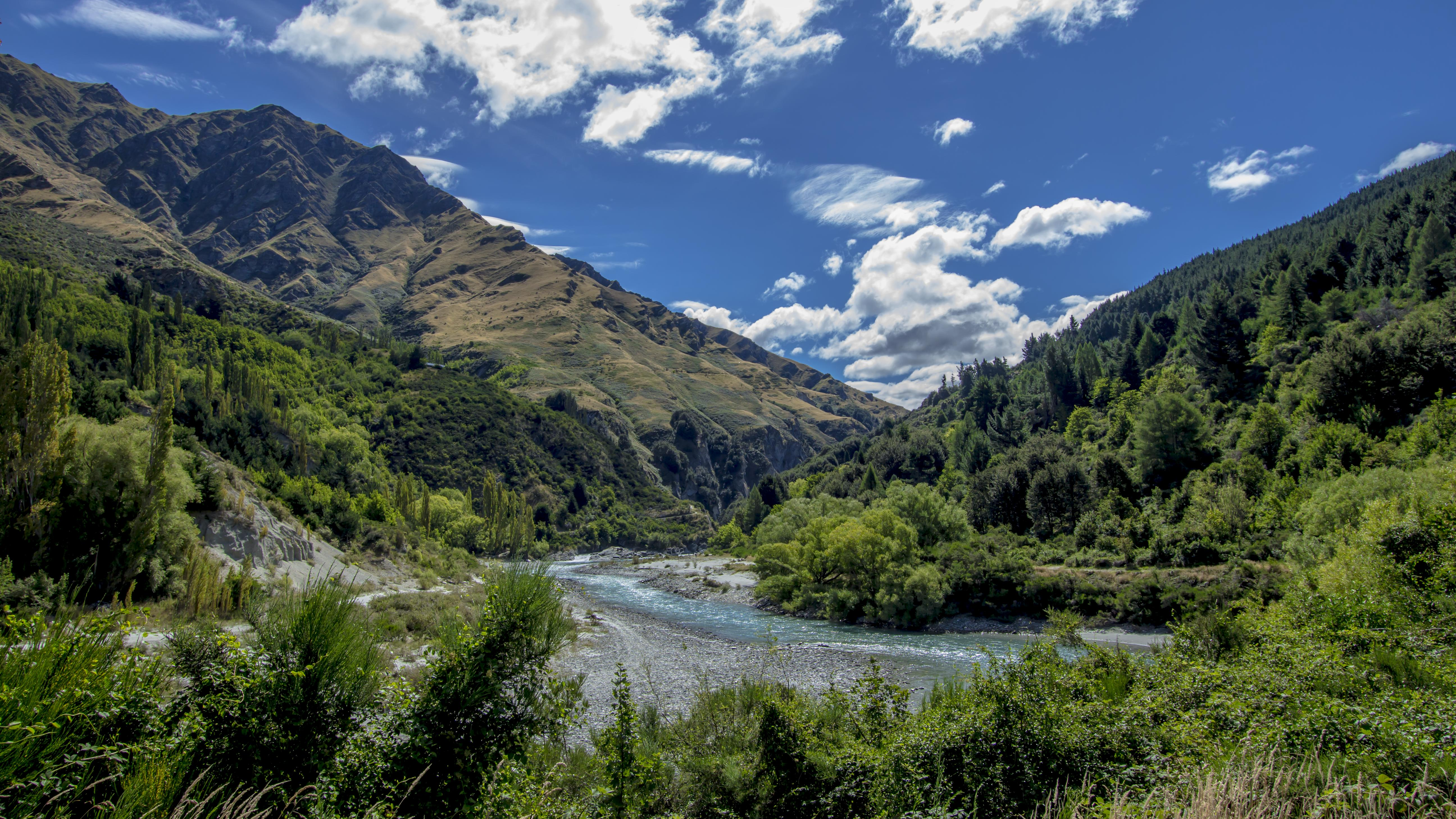
Shotover River, 2013

Gold mining featured in its early history and it was one of the richest gold-bearing rivers in the world. Beginning in 1862 when gold was first discovered on the river at Arthurs Point, the river has been panned, cradled, sluiced and dredged. Today small-time gold seekers still work the river and two of its tributaries, Moke and Moonlight Creeks, for gold. It is now a popular river for tourism.

The river is used for commercial white water rafting trips and jet boating rides which operate out of the nearby tourist resort of Queenstown. There is also a canyon swing site on the river a short distance upriver from Arthurs Point. Three jet boat operators have rights to use the river, as do two rafting companies. Much of the land that surrounds the Shotover River, upstream from Arthurs Point, is now foreign-owned by Robert Lange, the former husband of singer Shania Twain.

== Naming ==
The Māori name for the river is Kimiākau which translates to "looking for the coast" which is probably a reference to the area as a route to the West Coast in search of pounamu (greenstone).

The river was named Shotover by the first European, William Gilbert Rees to settle on the shores of Lake Wakatipu in 1860. He named it after his business partner, George Gammie's English estate, Shotover Park. The river had been previously called Tummel by two Scottish pioneers named Donald Angus Cameron and Angus Alphonse Macdonald who had passed through the area before Rees arrived.

== Old lower Shotover bridge ==
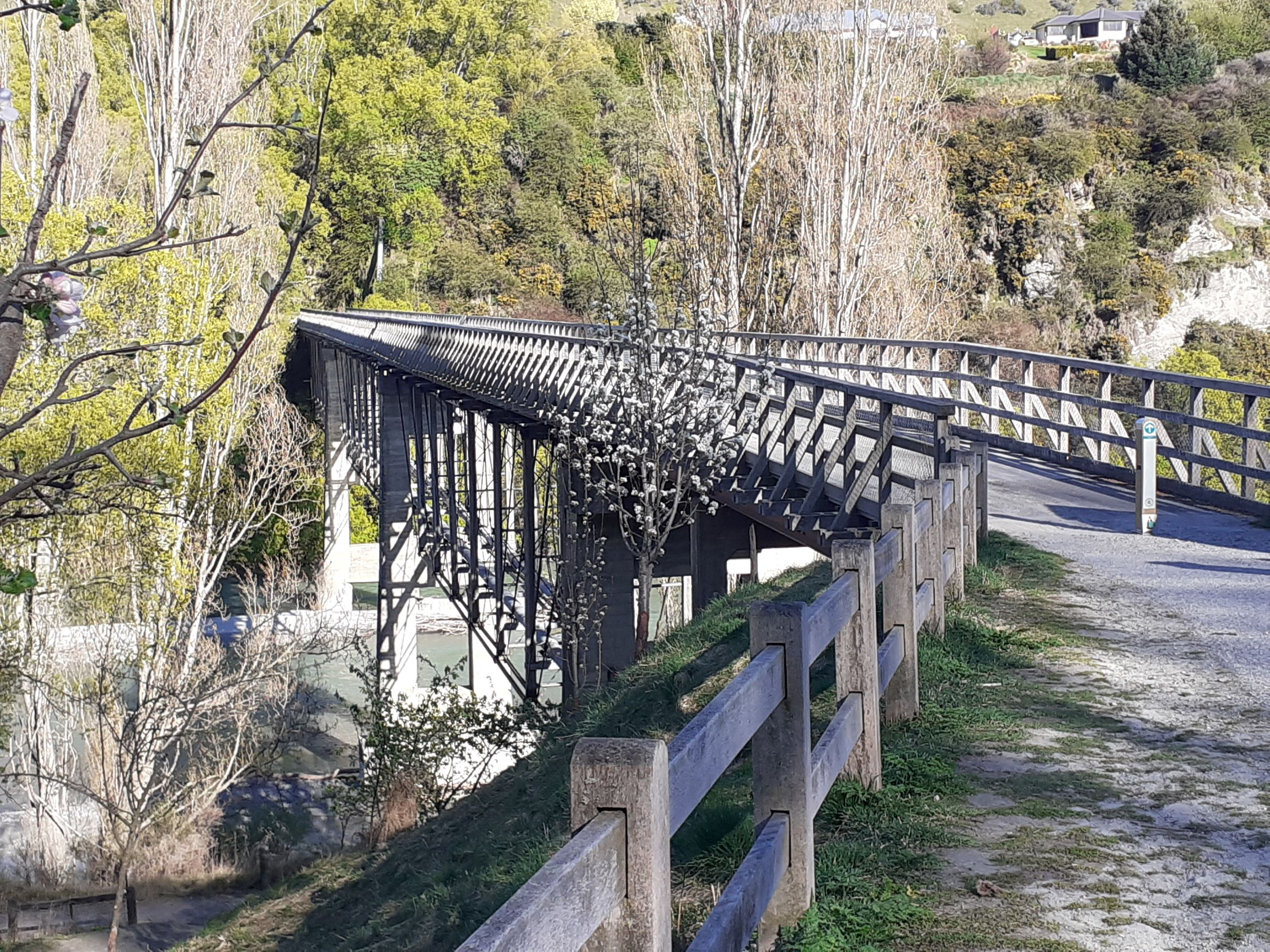
Lower Shotover Bridge (October 2021)

The old lower Shotover bridge was built in 1915 and replaced the previous bridge. It, in turn was replaced in 1975 by a new bridge and was used after then as a support for a pipeline. In 2004, the bridge was restored and now forms part of the Queenstown trail. The bridge is 172.5 metres long and built with tall concrete piers.

== Oxenbridge tunnel ==
The Oxenbridge Tunnel at Arthurs Point is a 170-metre (560 ft) tunnel that was part of a failed mining scheme by the Oxenbridge brothers, attempting to divert water from the river to recover gold from the riverbed. It was registered as a Category II Historic Place in 1985, and is used by rafters and kayakers. There is a Department of Conservation track called the Oxenbridge Tunnel Track that goes from the Edith Cavell Bridge alongside the Shotover River to a place near the Oxenbridge Tunnel.

== Freezing ==
In July 1991 and June 1992 the river froze from bank-to-bank, near Skippers Canyon, and car-tyre sized blocks of ice disrupted tourist activities in July 2007.

Also in 2012 large parts of the river froze after a series of cold days which also affected commercial operators.
