= Mason & Wales =

New Zealand architectural firm

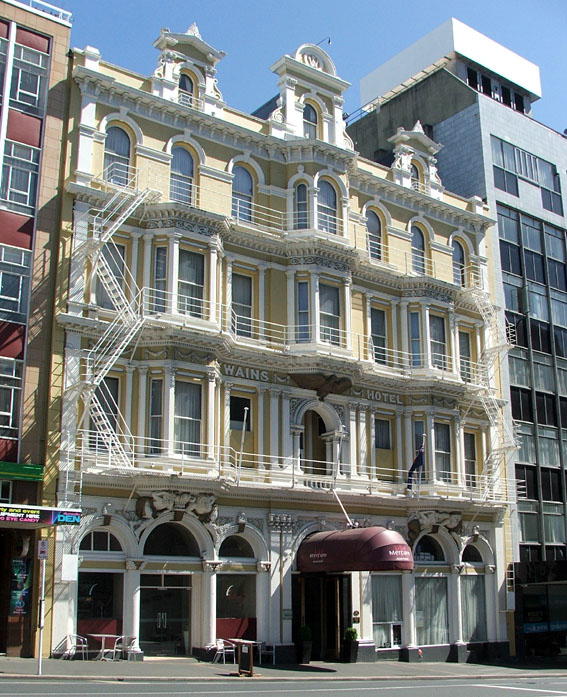
Wains Hotel Building, a 1878 Mason & Wales structure

Mason & Wales is a New Zealand architectural practice. They were the architects on Dunedin buildings the Wains Hotel (1878), Garrison Hall (1879), the Scott Building (1916) at the University of Otago Dunedin School of Medicine (1916) in Queenstown the Queenstown Police Station (1996).

== History ==
Mason & Wales was founded in Dunedin in 1862 by William Mason, who, as well as being an architect, had served as a Member of Parliament and as the first Mayor of Dunedin. He was joined in partnership by Nathaniel Wales in 1871.

Mason & Wales was responsible for many of the grand buildings which were built in Dunedin as a result of prosperity brought about by the Otago gold rush, among them Dunedin's Bank of New Zealand building (1863), Exchange Building (1864–68), Bank of New South Wales (1868), St. Matthew's Church (1973), Wains Hotel (1878), Linden house (1879) and Garrison Hall (1879). Early twentieth-century Mason & Wales structures include the Scott Building at the University of Otago Dunedin School of Medicine (1916). They were also the supervising architects for the building of the Ernest George-designed Jacobean house Olveston (1907). In more recent times, Mason & Wales have been the architectural firm behind buildings such as blocks F and H of Otago Polytechnic, the University of Otago Clubs and Societies building, Invermay Agricultural Centre, and Queenstown Police Station (1996).

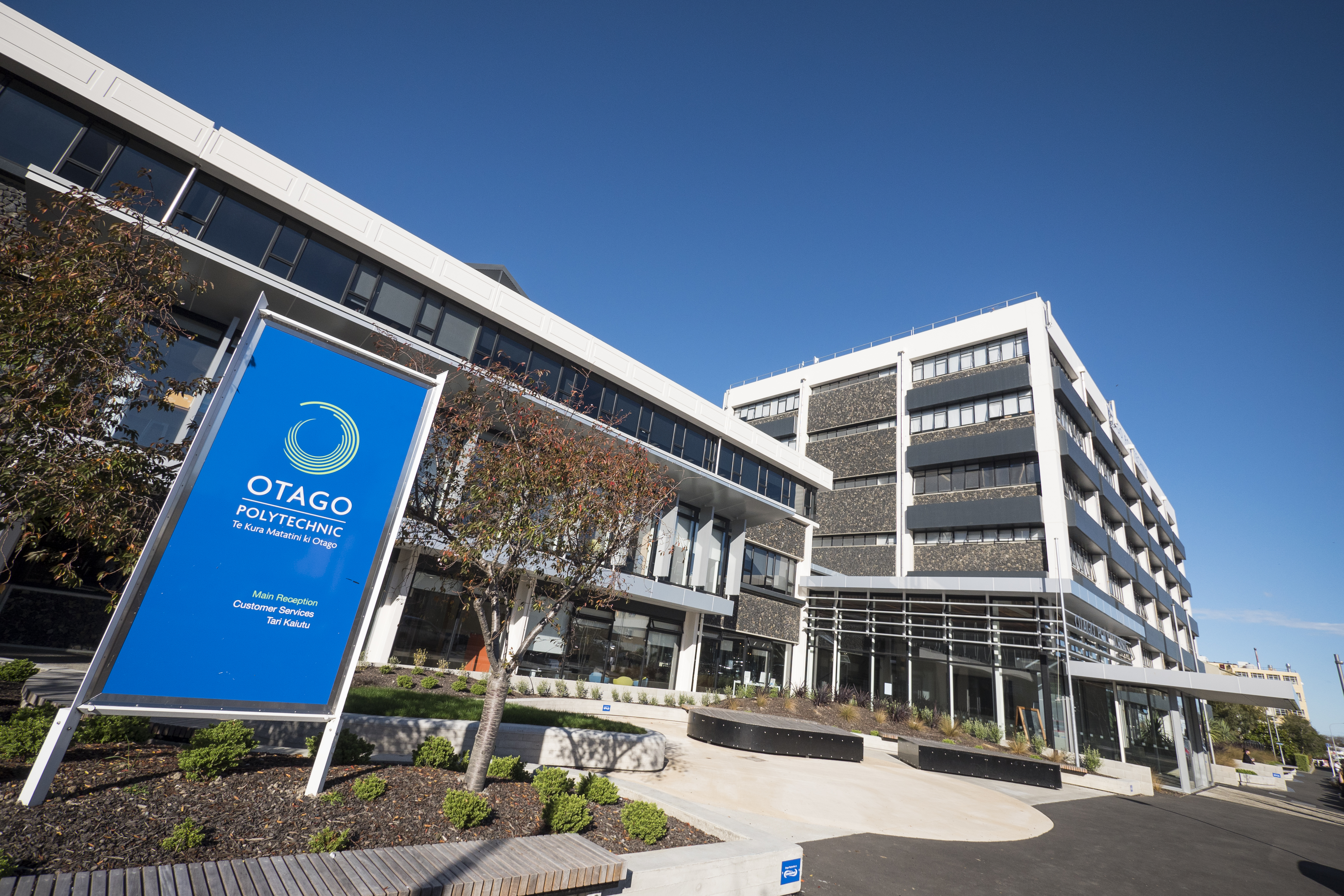
Blocks F and H of Otago Polytechnic

The firm remains Dunedin-based, although their designs are now found throughout New Zealand. It maintained a family connection to its founders until the death of Wales's great-grandson, architect Niel Wales, in 2011.

== Awards ==
Since the inception of the New Zealand Institute of Architects Awards for Architecture in the 1970s, Mason & Wales has won numerous local and branch awards, as well as national awards in 1981 and 1983 for Otago Harbour Board buildings in Port Chalmers and Dunedin respectively, and in 2002 for the Fisher & Paykel Healthcare office building and plant in Auckland.
