= Edith Cavell Bridge =

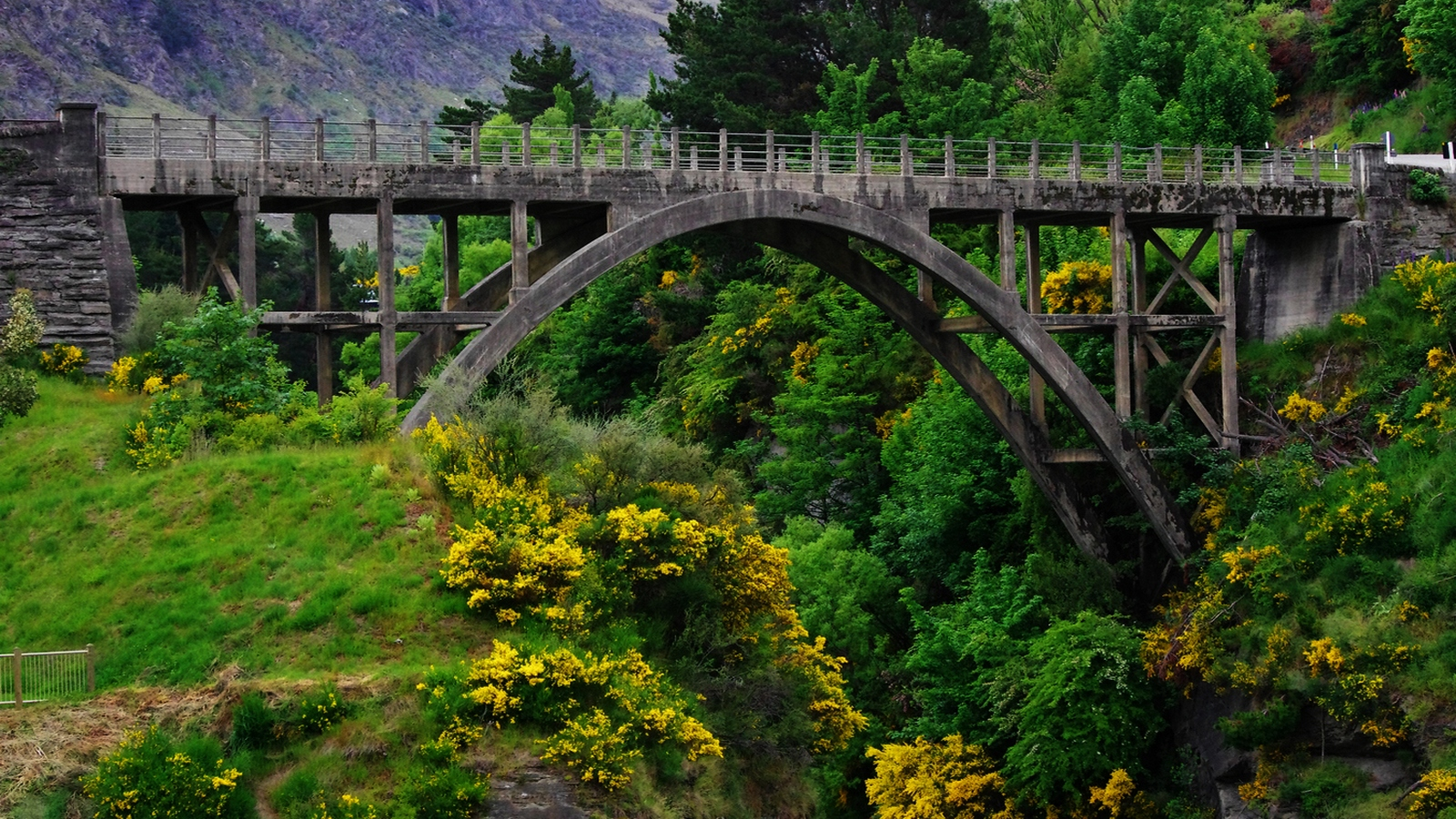
- November 2012 view of the Edith Cavell Bridge over the Shotover River
- Coordinates: 44°59′17.9″S 168°40′18.8″E
- Carries: road traffic
- Crosses: Shotover River
- Locale: near Queenstown, New Zealand
- Named for: Edith Cavell
- Owner: Queenstown-Lakes District
- Heritage status: Heritage New Zealand Category I
- ID number: 4371

Characteristics
- Design: Parabolic rib arch
- Material: Reinforced concrete
- No. of spans: one

History
- Designer: Frederick Furkert
- Constructed by: Steve Aburn
- Construction start: 1 November 1917
- Construction end: 13 February 1919
- Construction cost: £8,000
- Opened: 13 February 1919

Location
- Interactive map of Edith Cavell Bridge

Edith Cavell Bridge is a bridge over the Shotover River in the Otago region in the South Island of New Zealand that stands at 47.8 metres (157 ft) tall. It is registered by Heritage New Zealand as a Category I heritage structure.

== Location ==
Built at Arthurs Point, between Queenstown and Arrowtown, this single-lane bridge straddles the Shotover River. It is adjacent to the popular Shotover Jet tourist attraction and is often photographed.

== Construction ==
The design was conceived by Frederick Furkert, the inspecting engineer of the Public Works Department, and is a parabolic rib arch truss design. This was the second bridge of this type in New Zealand, the first being the Grafton Bridge in Auckland. It was built from concrete and steel between 1 November 1917 and 13 February 1919 by Steve Aburn and cost over £8,000. It was designed to replace an earlier wooden trestle bridge (built in 1875), which in turn had replaced a basic wooden bridge. In April 2016, the rock wall of the bridge was struck by a driver who lost control while braking, causing significant damage.

== Name ==
The route improved by the bridge was a well travelled one by gold miners. One old miner, Jack (John) Clark, who lived in a sod hut overlooking the bridge, took it upon himself to name it "The Edith Cavell Bridge" in honour of the famous nurse, who had been executed during the First World War for helping wounded Allied soldiers escape from occupied Belgium. Clark's suggestion was not popular with the County council; the councillors wanted to name it Cooper's Crossing after the mayor of the time, Warren Cooper, but Clark painted "To Cavell Bridge" on a sign approaching the bridge and also "Edith Cavell Bridge" on the bridge itself. Eventually the name stuck.

== Heritage listing ==
On 26 November 1987, the bridge was listed by the New Zealand Historic Places Trust (since renamed to Heritage New Zealand) as a Category I historic structure, with registration number 4371.
