= Ben Lomond (Otago) =

Mountain near Queenstown, New Zealand

- Te-taumata-o-Hakitekura
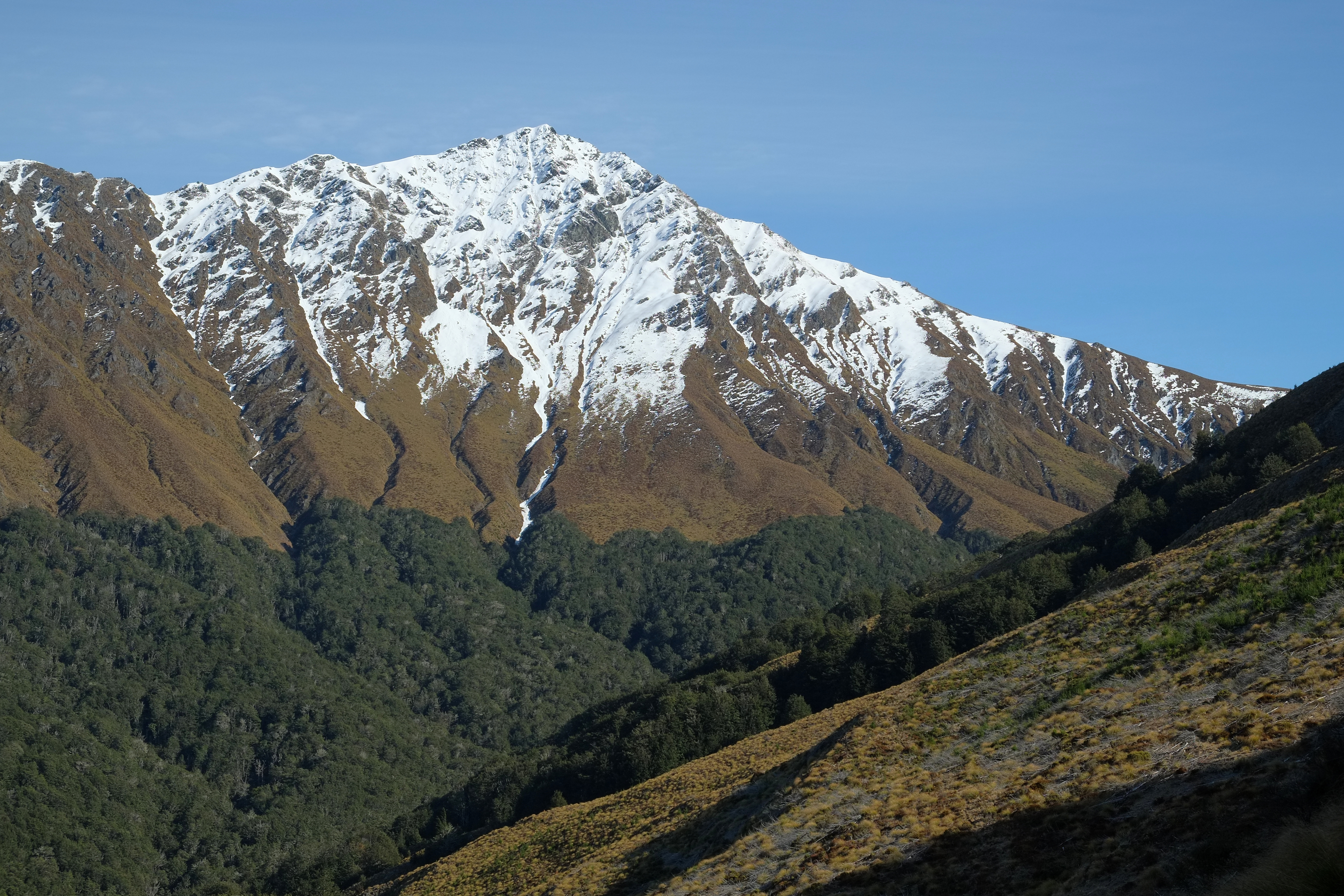
- Ben Lomond in spring, from near the start of Ben Lomond track on Cemetery Hill (Bob's Peak)

Highest point
- Elevation: 1,748 m (5,735 ft)
- Coordinates: 45°0′25.2″S 168°36′56″E

Geography
- Location within New Zealand
- Location: South Island, New Zealand

Climbing
- First ascent: 1860 by W. G. Rees & N. von Tunzelmann

Ben Lomond is a mountain close to Queenstown, New Zealand. It was named after Ben Lomond in Scotland by the early shepherd Duncan McAusland. The summit is approximately 4 km (2.5 mi) northwest of the town centre and reaches a height of 1,748 metres (5,735 ft). Connected to Ben Lomond are the large but slightly shorter Bowen Peak (1,631 m) and Bob's Peaks, while nearby is the dominant feature of Queenstown Hill. There are scenic views available from a range of places on the mountain with the top giving a 360-degree panorama of much of the Wakatipu Basin including Lake Wakatipu, The Remarkables Mountains, Cecil Peak and Walter Peak.

== Access ==
The Ben Lomond track can be accessed via three main routes that start at the One Mile Carpark, the access road on Lomond Crescent or from the Skyline Building on Brecon Street. If using the third option the easiest form of access is via the Skyline Gondola which takes you part way up the mountain, with foot access from the same location via the Tiki Trail.

Alternative much harder routes are from the Moonlight Track starting at either Moke Lake or Arthurs Point which both lead to the Ben Lomond saddle. There are also several entrances in the suburb of Fernhill.

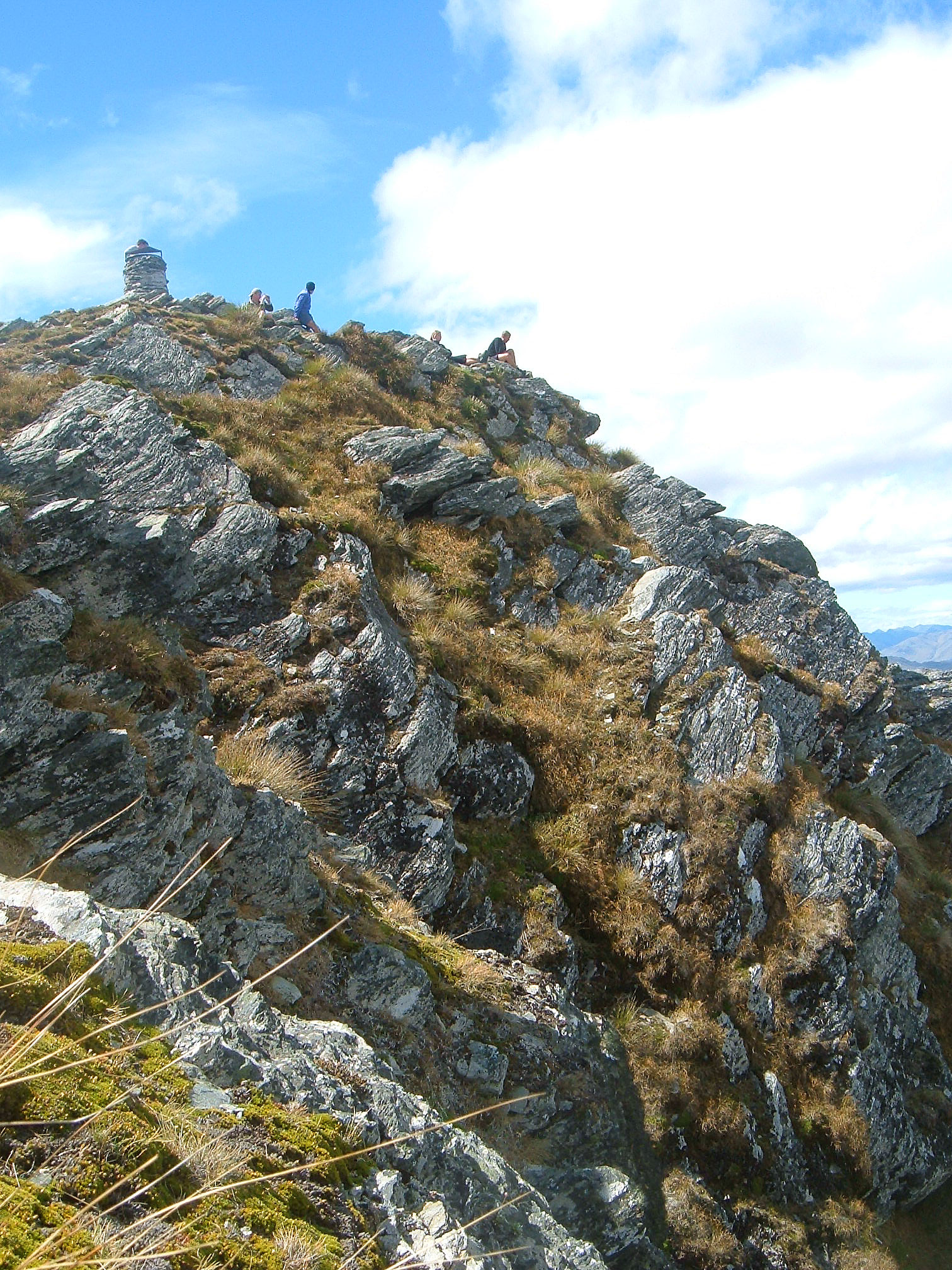
View of the summit at the top of Ben Lomond

== Tracks ==
The main track runs through exotic Douglas Fir forest upwards passing occasionally through Mountain Beech before opening up into tussock grasslands. The track follows a ridgeline up to the saddle between Ben Lomond and Bowen Peak before becoming quite steep for the summit track to the top. New Zealand Mountain Safety Council's video on the Ben Lomond Track

There are many smaller tracks other than the one that leads to the summit: The Fernhill Link Track is an easy grade track that links the suburbs of Fernhill and Sunshine Bay with Queenstown. There are several bridges that pass over streams. The Fernhill Loop Track is a large medium fitness level walk or bike that runs through Mountain Beech forest but is currently closed due to maintenance issues. From the One Mile Powerhouse carpark there is a track that runs up and follows a stream through native forest, later on it turns into Douglas Fir forest. The Tiki Trail runs from the base of the Skyline base building going all the way to the Luge area. These tracks are just a selection of many that criss-cross Ben Lomond's slopes which can be hiked or run.

== Activities ==
There are a variety of walking/biking tracks on Ben Lomond most of which are located in area around the base called the Ben Lomond Scenic Reserve.

The biking activities in the area are extensive and include a network of trails for Downhill mountain biking. These can be accessed either by biking uphill, using a vehicle to transport the bikes or the popular Skyline Gondola option.

Foot access is also available on a vehicle service road which services the businesses on Cemetery Hill (misnamed Bob's Peak). The main access routes from the bottom are either via the One Mile carpark or the Skyline access road. Both tracks join and then follow a ridge up to a saddle before a steep route on private land leads to the peak, most of the route is clearly marked.

== Cemetery Hill or Bob's Peak ==
Highly visible from Queenstown is Cemetery Hill (also known as Bob's Peak) which is part of Ben Lomond. Although mainly covered in Douglas Fir forest, Cemetery Hill is used by several businesses for leisure activities; the most visible is the Skyline Complex and associated Luge Track. Paragliding occurs regularly depending on the weather. A zipline flying fox company also operates near the complex, with the lines running down as far as Brecon Street.

While this is the common usage location for Bob's Peak, most maps point to a different location of the Moke Lake area.

== Flora and fauna ==
At lower levels there is a large forest of Douglas fir which is often incorrectly referred to as a pine tree. There are small pockets of mountain beech left which are slowly being crowded out by the faster-growing fir trees. At higher levels there are larger patches of beech forest and large tracts of native tussock and herb fields.

The most common bird seen is the New Zealand pipit which flits around the tussocks looking for food. Also commonly seen are tūī and bellbirds. Less common are the tomtit, Australasian harrier, wood pigeon and occasionally kea.

Numerous feral goats can be seen and smelt all over the mountain. As part of Ben Lomond forms the Ben Lomond Station there are also many domestic cattle and sheep especially on the trail from the saddle to Arthurs Point.

== Conservation due to exotic forest spread ==
Douglas Fir forest was originally sown on the lower slopes of Cemetery Hill in the late 19th century as part of a beautification project led by a local pharmacist Louis Hotop. In the early to mid 20th century further plantings became part of the town's Arbor Day activities. Since the 1960s, following the culling of feral goats, which up to then had kept seedling-spread in check, they have rapidly grown and have been spreading quickly up and along Ben Lomond's slopes. The Department of Conservation did some control operations, but the responsibility has since passed on to the local council and various volunteer groups such Eco Action Network. These fir trees, although exotic, grow at a rate faster than in their original homeland of North America and create a monocultural forest devoid of the variety of native vegetation normally growing in the area. It has in some areas overtaken even mature beech forest. Control methods include: Hand pulling small seedlings, lopping the base of larger trees that are about one to three metres high, using chainsaws to chop down big tree above three metres in height, occasionally aerial spraying by helicopter is used in higher altitude areas that are hard to access by foot.

== See also ==
- List of mountains of New Zealand by height
