= Skippers Canyon =

Canyon in New Zealand

Coordinates: 44.878863°S 168.626490°E

Skippers Canyon is a historic and scenic gorge, some 22 kilometres in length, several kilometres north of Queenstown, New Zealand.

Today accessed from Queenstown via the same road that leads to the Coronet Peak skifield, Skippers Canyon is carved out by the Shotover River. The Shotover, one of New Zealand's richest gold-bearing rivers, was named by William Gilbert Rees who with his wife Frances and brother-in-law Nicholas von Tunzelmann were the first European settlers in and near where Queenstown is now.

Once a busy goldmining area, Skippers Canyon was accessed by Skippers Road, which is today one of New Zealand's better known scenic roads.

The main New Zealand road where rental car insurance is not honoured, Skippers Road is mostly one-lane, narrow and steep with sheer drops of several hundred metres. In 1886, Skippers Canyon was also the first site where hydroelectricity was generated to power goldmining.

== The start of the gold rush in Skippers Canyon ==
In November 1862, Thomas Arthur and Harry Redfern discovered in the area of today's Arthurs Point about 4 ounces of gold within 3 hours. Arthur and Redfern made no secret of their gold discoveries. With such richness in sight, it was no wonder that the area was soon swarmed by miners trying to find their luck. This was the beginning of one of the largest rushes that occurred in Otago. Soon after the start of the gold rush, the miners referred to the Shotover River as the 'richest river in the world'. There is however no proof available that this is true as no official records were kept about how much gold was actually found.

== Charlestown ==
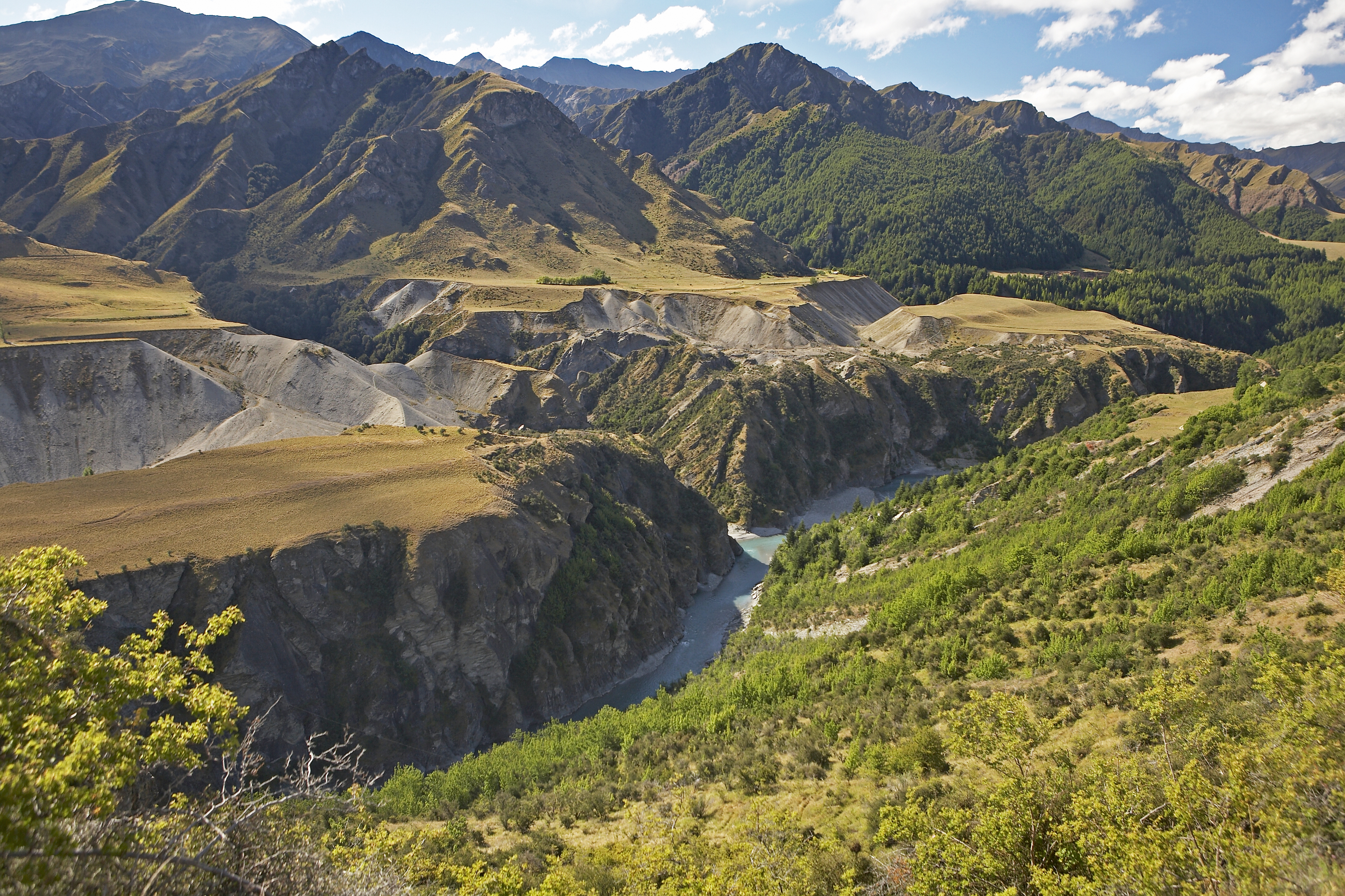
Skippers Canyon Maori Point

Charlestown was a little settlement in Skippers Canyon. After the first gold was found, gold miners soon encountered the gorge behind Arthurs Point by following 'the golden river' upstream. They had to find their own way over the trackless hills as the river was deep and swift. For much of its course, it is confined in steep-walled gorges. Undaunted by the difficulties, miners climbed the mountains and descended to the beaches wherever possible. Soon a remarkable discovery of gold was found at Māori Point (as it became known). Two Māori miners, Dan Ellison (Raniera Erihana) and Hakaria Maeroa travelled to a secluded gorge in Skippers Canyon. They could see on the opposite shore some promising appearances and boldly tried to cross the river. One of their dogs followed them and was washed away. Dan Ellison went to its assistance and could rescue the dog. At shore, he observed some particles of gold in the crevices of the rocks and started to examine the sandy beach beneath. With the aid of Hakaria, they gathered 25 pounds (or 300 ounces) of precious metal before nightfall.

This substantial find formed the birth hour of Charlestown. It was built on the flat land of Māori Point. Soon hotels were established, butchers, bakers, a post office and a bank settled at Charlestown. There was even a police station and a resident magistrate who was appointed to settle claim disputes on location. Charlestown boomed shortly, peaking with a population of about 1,000 people. But by 1864 the easily gained gold had been won and the population dropped to about 400 people. Today, only very little remains of Charlestown in Skippers Canyon: stones of a fallen chimney, a small plaque and an explanation booth mark the area.

== Skippers Point ==
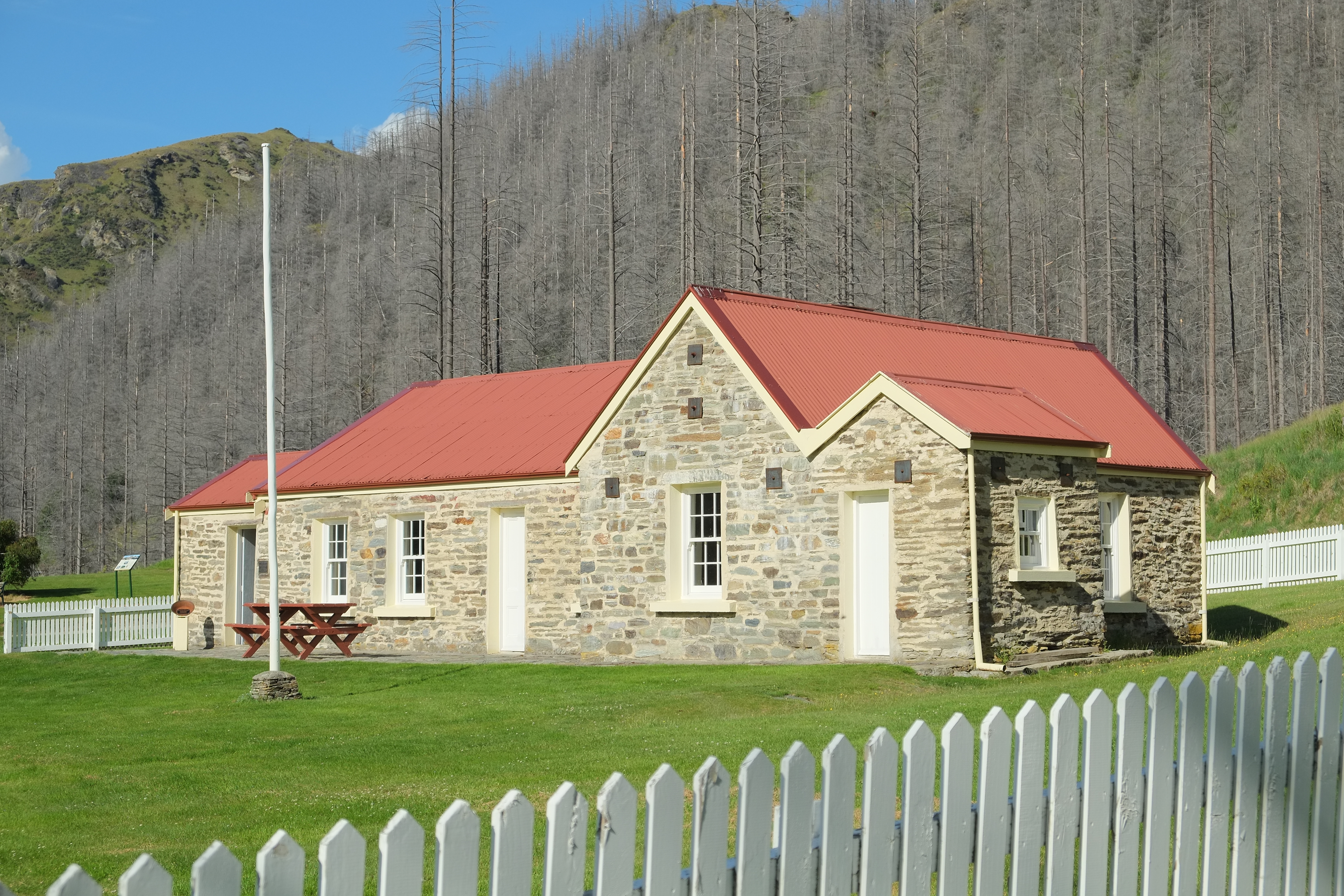
Skippers Point Queenstown

The canyon and Skippers Point were named after 'Skipper' Malcolm Duncan, who discovered gold in the canyon in 1862. Born in Northern Ireland, Duncan served for a number of years on American ships, hence the nickname 'Skipper'. Duncan took part in the gold rush and discovered gold at Skippers Creek, which soon became known as Skippers Point or simply 'Skippers'.

In 1866, a novel hydroelectric station was built at Dynamo, in the left branch of Skippers Creek. The station sent power 3 km over the hill to Bullendale, a small goldmining settlement some 4 hours walk from the farthest end of Skippers Road, where it powered an aircompressor to run a stamping plant to separate gold from quartz. The plant was not profitable.

Next to Duncan, several other gold miners took claims in the area of Skippers Point where they remained working on them until the early 1900s. The remains of their water races, holding dams, sluicings and tailings of the established claims are still obvious today. A huge sluiced basin of the Skippers Sluicing Company's claim, right below Mount Aurum Station's Homestead and Skippers School, is very much visible today, even though it is completely covered by trees. Like Charlestown, Skippers Point had an initial population of about 1,000 people but stabilised to about 200 around 1864. At one stage, there were six hotels at Skippers Point, but like Charlestown, their life was short.

Today, only the remains of Mount Aurum Station's Homestead and the restored Skippers School as well as the cemetery are visible. Mount Aurum Station's Homestead burned down in 2018. The cemetery contains some interesting headstones. Of more recent times is the delightful inscription on the grave of Lorraine Borrell: "my time is up, I’ve been clocked out. The judge has tapped the gavel. I’ll retire the teapot, lay the knitting down and quietly unravel."

== Skippers Road ==
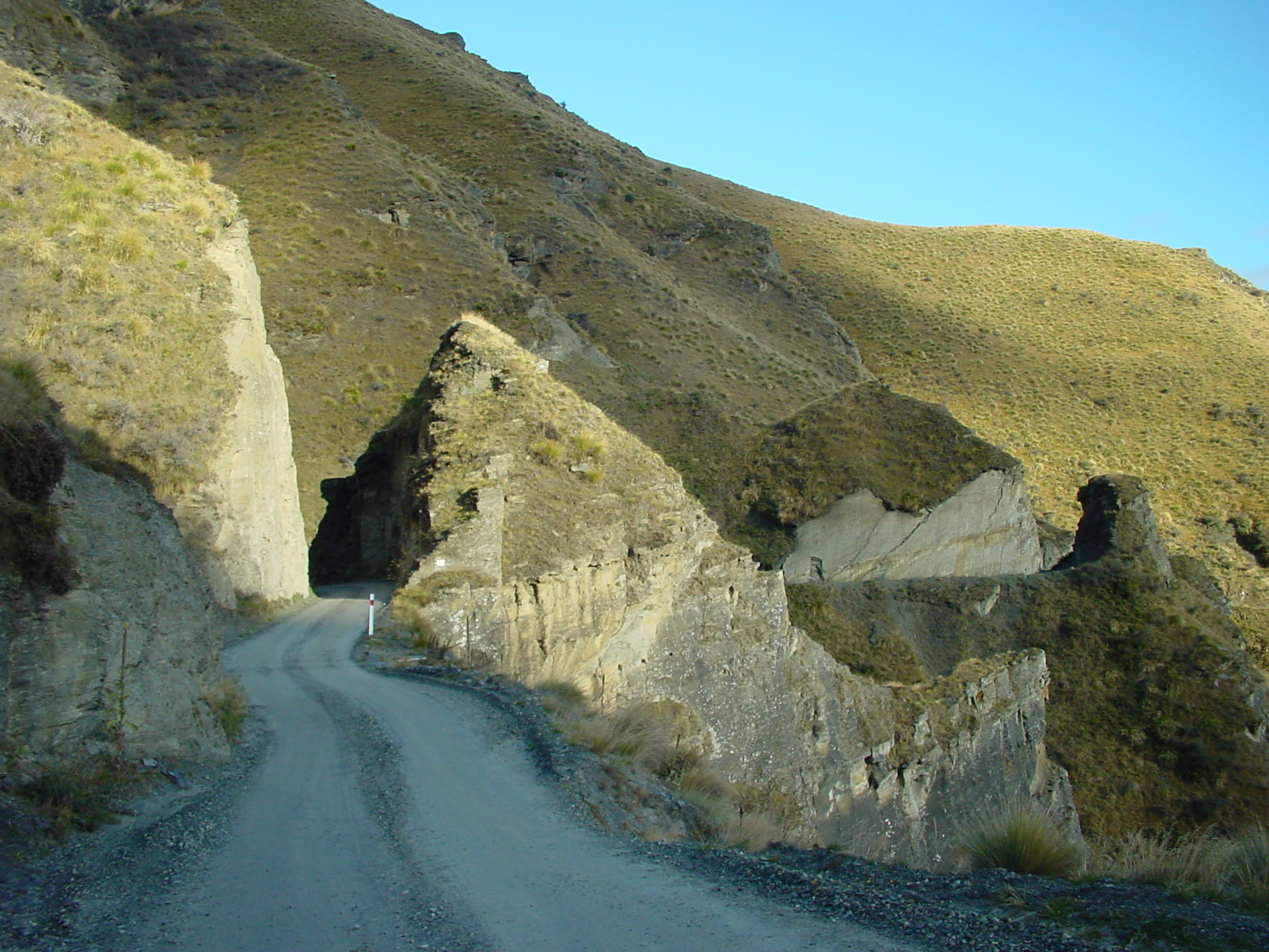
Hells Gate on Skippers Road

At the beginning of the gold rush, no track or road was present in Skippers Canyon. As the gold miners travelled through the canyon with their horses, tracks were formed. They were rough and steep but established ways to Deep Creek, Māori Point and Skippers were in use in 1863. Those tracks however were unsafe and those who tried to take packhorses sometimes lost them and their supplies.

In order to make the access to Skippers safer and to be able to bring in heavy machinery for the gold miners, the demand for a proper road grew. Skippers Road was surveyed at about 1883 with the goal to make Skippers Canyon more accessible. The road was built by 4 contractors who completed their work in stages over the period of seven years. Many sections of the road remain today very much as they were in 1890.

It has been said of Skippers Road that more money has been spent on its account than all the gold could repay it. This comment, however only meant figuratively, nicely explains the enormous costs and difficulty involved not only in forming the road but also in maintaining it. The local rock is so soft that under the traffic it quickly turns into dust in dry weather and to greasy mud in wet. Under these conditions it is no surprise to learn that initially motor vehicles were banned from driving on Skippers Road at the beginning of the 1900s.

By the time of its completion the gold rush was basically over, but some future-oriented people of the Queenstown district saw potential in the use of Skippers Road as a tourist attraction. Petitions supporting the plan that cars could be used to travel on Skippers Road as well as petitions to ban them were signed. The community was split in two groups as a result. The court ruled that Skippers Road could be used by cars, but drivers were obliged to give plenty of warning of their travel plans by applying for a permit. Even time limits of usage were defined. A fine of ten dollars was the penalty if those regulations were disregarded.

Today, Skippers Road is a tourist attraction. It is protected by Heritage New Zealand since 15 December 2006 under the register number 7684.

== Skippers Bridge ==
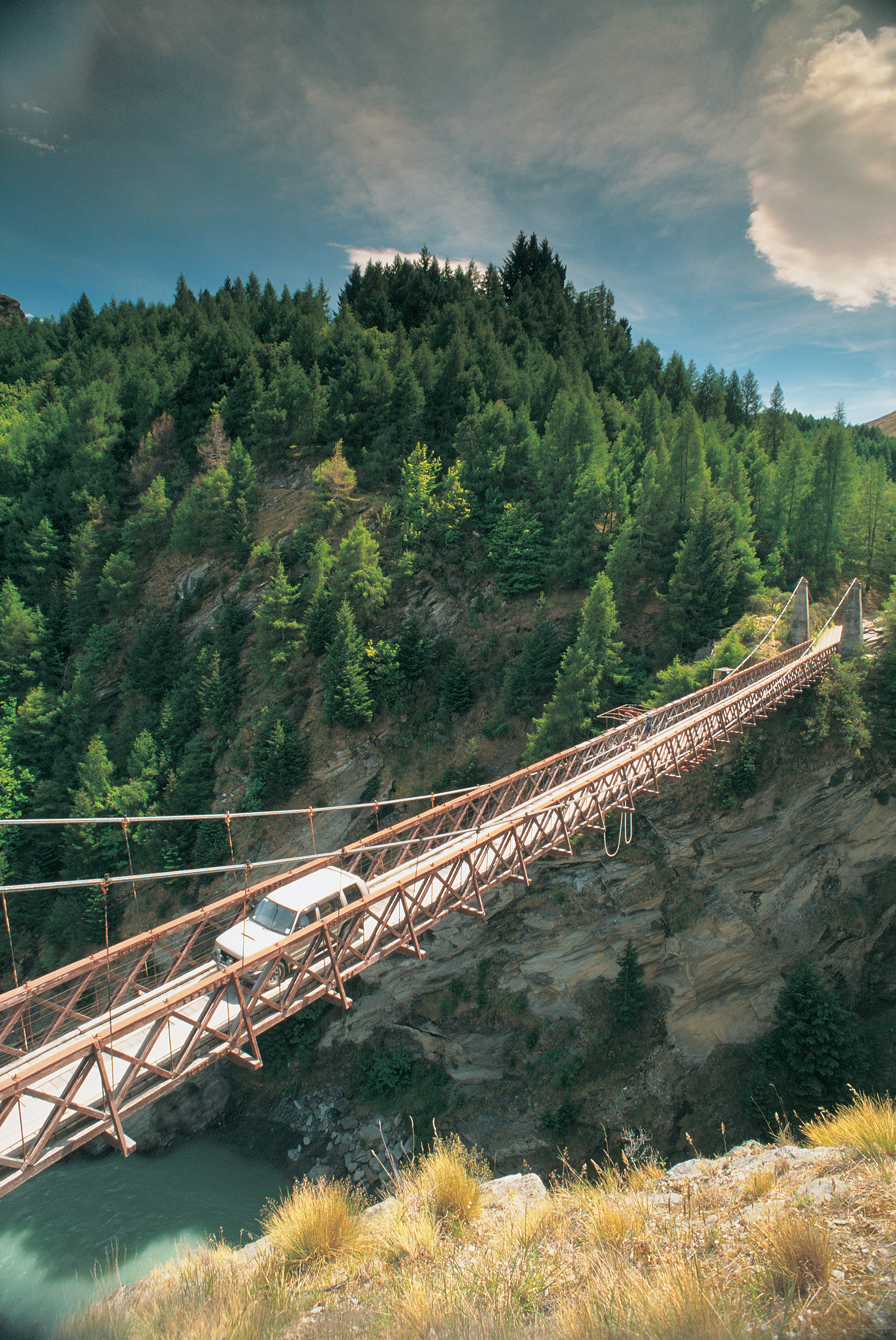
Skippers Bridge in Skippers Canyon

The first bridge that enabled the gold miners to safely reach Skippers Point was a suspension structure. Building of this bridge began as early as 1866. It crossed the river only 6 metres above the water and was prone to damage from flooding. It was replaced in 1871 but rebuilt at the same place. The access to this first crossing of the Shotover River was difficult as the approaches to it were very steep on both sides. At the time the new road to Skippers Point was completed, plans for a new higher bridge were made. Work on this new bridge began in 1898 and lasted for about 2 years. In March 1901, the bridge was officially opened by the Minister of Mines and finally replaced the old one. The stone approaches of the old bridge still stand and are visible from Skippers Road.

Even though the completion of the existing Skippers Bridge was done after the gold rush was over, it is today one of the major attractions for visitors to Skippers Canyon as it spans a gorge with sheer rock faces on both sides and is about 100 metres above the river.
