= Unwin Radar =

Scientific radar array at Awarua

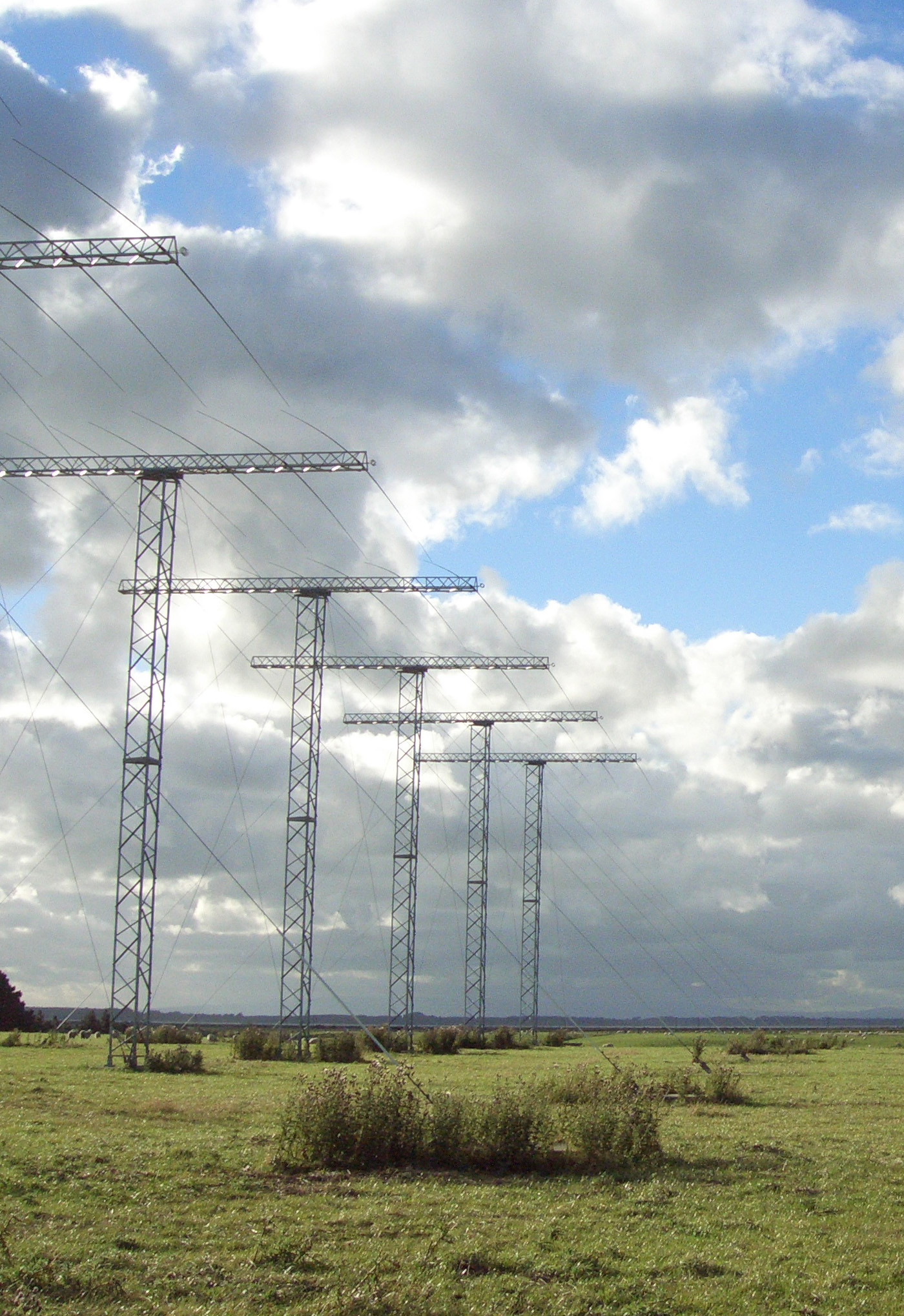
The Unwin Radar array at Awarua

The Unwin Radar is a scientific radar array at Awarua, near Invercargill, New Zealand 46.51°S 168.38°E.

Unwin is part of the Super Dual Auroral Radar Network (SuperDARN), an international radar network for studying the upper atmosphere and ionosphere that operates in the High Frequency (HF) bands between 8 and 22 MHz.

The radar and associated research provides greater understanding of atmospheric weather, to assist with weather prediction, prediction of telecommunication interference and provide a better understanding of the effects of atmospheric magnetic fields on power grid management.

The facility is operated by La Trobe University and was named after R.S. Unwin, a pioneer in auroral radar research, who first proposed the concept behind the project in the 1960s

== Operation ==
Bursts of shortwave radio pulses are transmitted from the radar in a southern arc that includes the South Magnetic Pole. The ensuing reflections from micrometeorites, the ionosphere, ocean and aurora are detected at the station and resolved there.

The TIGER-Unwin is a monostatic, pulsed radar that operates in the 8 MHz - 20 MHz range. The transmitting antenna consists of an array of 16 log periodic antennas.

- These antennas form a narrow beam ~4 degrees (at 12 MHz) that is swept across the radar footprint in 16 steps (one step per antenna array).
- In the vertical direction the beam is ~30 degrees with a maximum in the range of 15 degrees (at 20 MHz) to 35 degrees (at 8 MHz).

An additional four antennas placed some distance behind the transmitting array. These antennas are used to form an interferometer receiving array that measures the elevation angle of echoes. In the standard operation mode the radar uses frequency hopping where the transmission frequency changes to accommodate changing ionospheric conditions. This frequency hopping is done by ongoing scanning the frequency band to determine automatically which channels are free of interference and provide the best coverage.

The data from Unwin is transmitted back to La Trobe University where it is made available over the Internet to users. The Unwin Radar and its counterpart at Bruny Island in Tasmania form the Tasman International Geospace Environment Radar (TIGER).

The Southland region is regarded as an ideal location for such a facility because of the southerly aspect, low radio noise and unobstructed horizon.
