= Awarua Plains =

Plain in New Zealand

Coordinates: 46.5281°S 168.4816°E

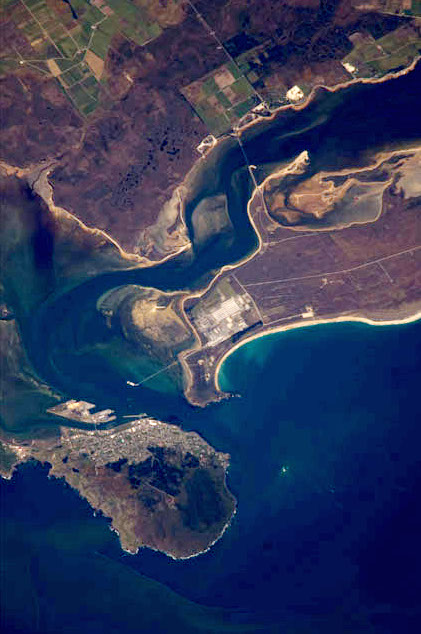
Awarua Plain (top), Tiwai Point (centre) and Bluff (lower left) viewed from the International Space Station in 2008.

The Awarua Plain is a large area of wetland to the east of Bluff, New Zealand. Covering an area of around 600 km², the plain stretches for 35 kilometres along the coast of Foveaux Strait. This stretch of coast includes the peninsula of Tiwai Point, Awarua Bay, the Waituna Lagoon, and Toetoes Bay. The Mataura River is the major river responsible for the presence of the Awarua Plain; along with the Ōreti River, it is a remnant of the rivers from the Ice Ages that formed the Southland Plains (Murihiku). In addition, several small streams enter Foveaux Strait along this stretch of coast, mainly via Awarua Bay and Waituna Lagoon.

The New Zealand Ministry for Culture and Heritage gives a translation of "two streams" for Awarua.

== Demographics ==
The Awarua Plains statistical area covers 409.10 km^{2} (157.95 sq mi) within Southland District. It had an estimated population of 1,100 as of June 2025, with a population density of 2.7 people per km^{2}.

Historical population
Year	Pop.	±% p.a.
2006	963	—
2013	1,026	+0.91%
2018	1,020	−0.12%

Awarua Plains had a population of 1,020 at the 2018 New Zealand census, a decrease of 6 people (−0.6%) since the 2013 census, and an increase of 57 people (5.9%) since the 2006 census. There were 360 households, comprising 531 males and 489 females, giving a sex ratio of 1.09 males per female. The median age was 32.3 years (compared with 37.4 years nationally), with 267 people (26.2%) aged under 15 years, 195 (19.1%) aged 15 to 29, 471 (46.2%) aged 30 to 64, and 87 (8.5%) aged 65 or older.

Ethnicities were 81.5% European/Pākehā, 13.2% Māori, 1.8% Pasifika, 11.8% Asian, and 3.2% other ethnicities. People may identify with more than one ethnicity.

The percentage of people born overseas was 17.1, compared with 27.1% nationally.

Although some people chose not to answer the census's question about religious affiliation, 51.2% had no religion, 39.7% were Christian, 0.3% had Māori religious beliefs, 0.6% were Hindu, 0.9% were Muslim, 0.6% were Buddhist and 1.2% had other religions.

Of those at least 15 years old, 117 (15.5%) people had a bachelor's or higher degree, and 150 (19.9%) people had no formal qualifications. The median income was $40,500, compared with $31,800 nationally. 120 people (15.9%) earned over $70,000 compared to 17.2% nationally. The employment status of those at least 15 was that 462 (61.4%) people were employed full-time, 150 (19.9%) were part-time, and 15 (2.0%) were unemployed.

== Radio facilities ==
The Awarua Plain is suitable for radio facilities, due to low distant skylines, high ground conductivity and distance from sources of radio interference. An expedition seeking 'an extensive area of flat lands [producing] the best results' first scouted the area for radio purposes in 1911.

Radio-related facilities here are:

- Unwin Radar of La Trobe University
- Awarua Tracking Station of the European Space Agency

=== Awarua Radio ===
Awarua Radio (callsign VLB or ZLB) was New Zealand's main receiving and transmitting coast radio station providing worldwide radiotelegraph and voice communications with ships at sea. Some facilities were built by Telefunken of Germany. It was operated from 18 December 1913 by the New Zealand Post Office (to 31 March 1986) then by NZPO successor corporation Telecom New Zealand until the station closed on 30 August 1991.

The site was selected following an expedition in 1911 led by Mr J Orchiston, head of the New Zealand Telegraph Department, Captain Gard'ner of the New Zealand Artillery and representatives of AWA, seeking 'an extensive area of flat lands [producing] the best results'.
