= Bowen Peak =

Mountain in New Zealand

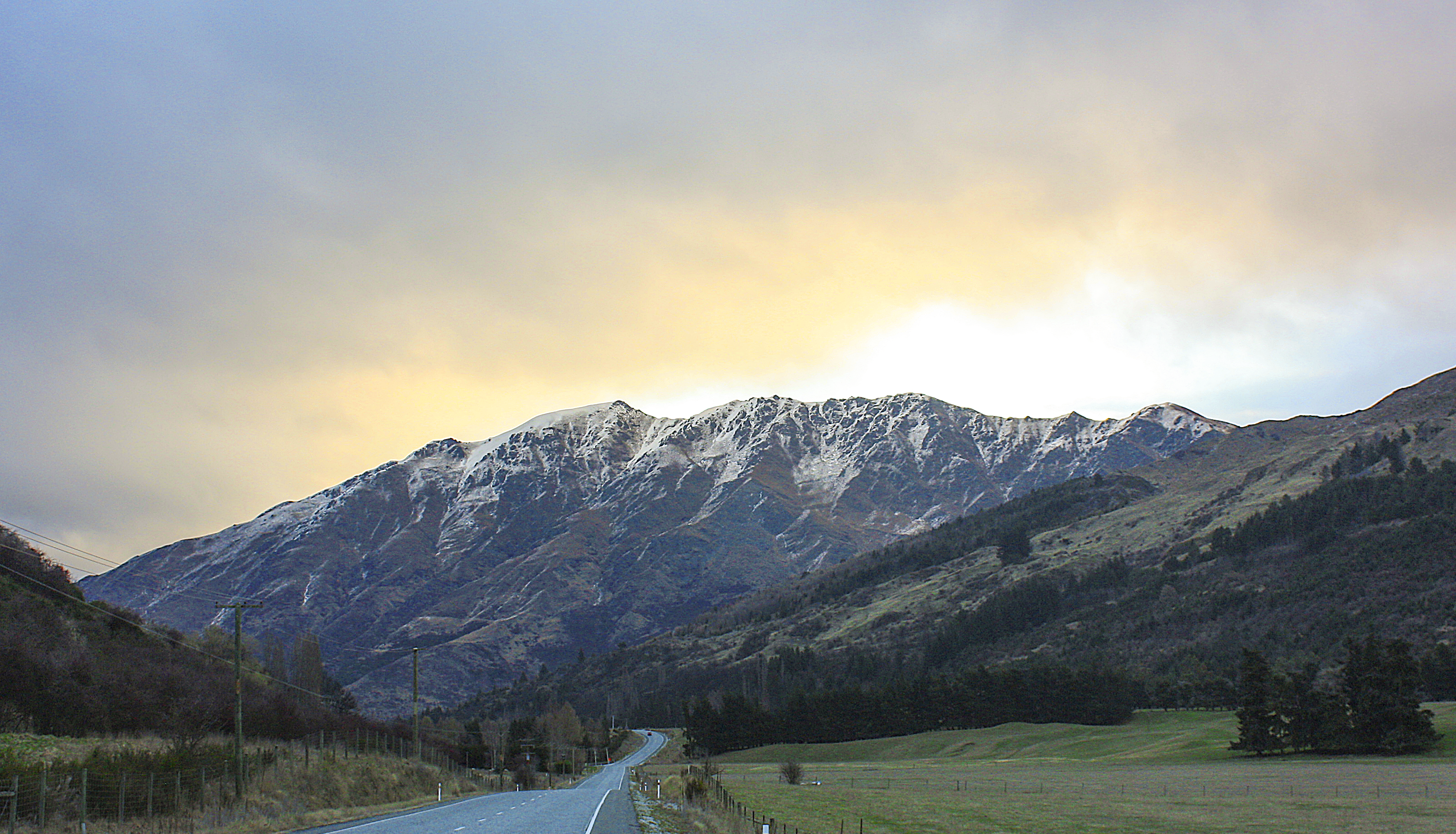
- Bowen Peak

Highest point
- Elevation: 1,631 m (5,351 ft)
- Coordinates: 44°59′49″S 168°38′24″E

Geography
- Location within New Zealand

Bowen Peak is a mountain located near Queenstown, New Zealand. It has a height of 1,631 metres (5,351 ft).

== See also ==
- List of mountains of New Zealand by height
