= St John's Church, Arrowtown =

Church at Arrowtown, New Zealand

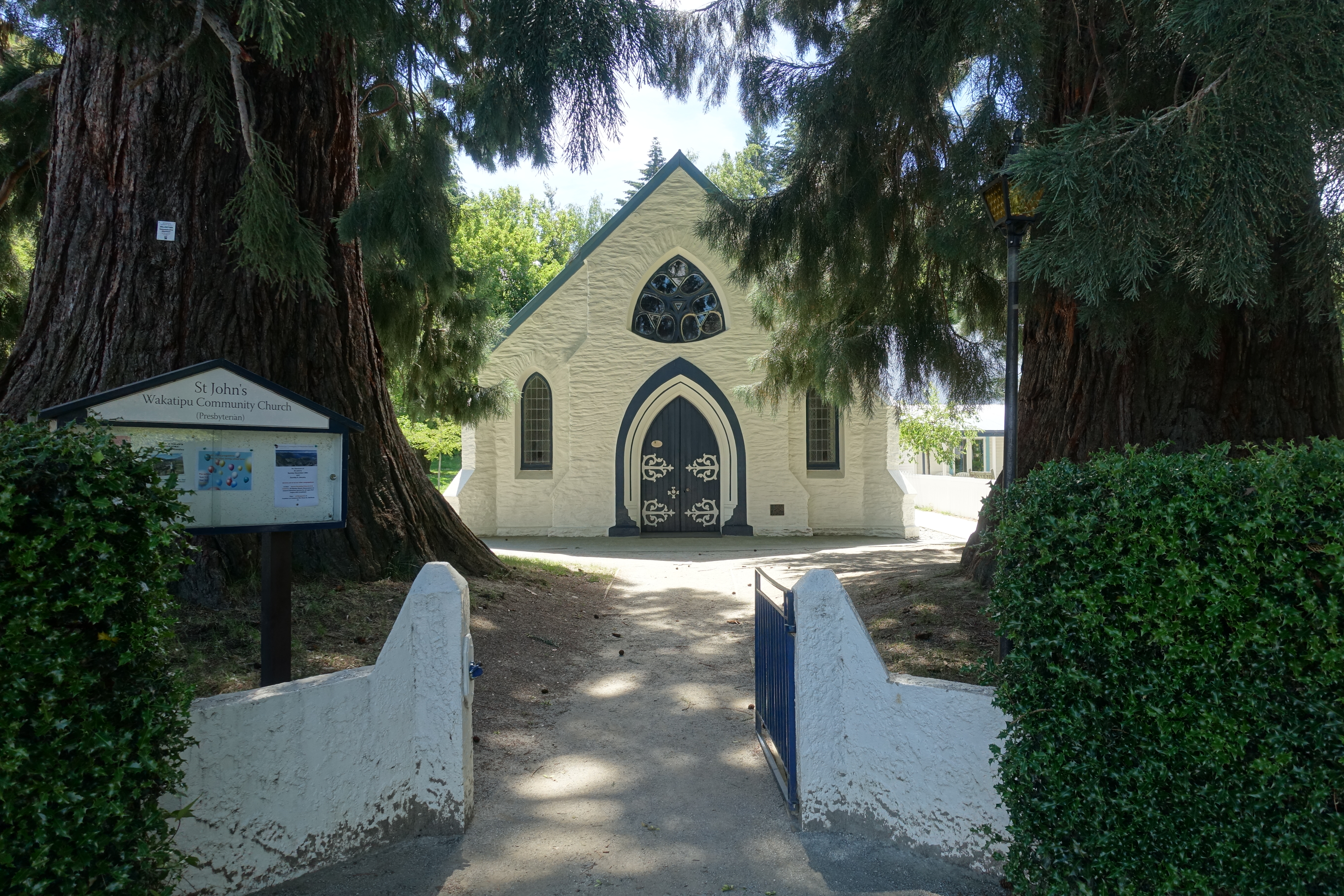
- St John's Church, Arrowtown
- 44°56′25″S 168°49′42″E
- Location: 26 Berkshire Street and Durham Street, Arrowtown
- Country: New Zealand
- Denomination: Presbyterian

Architecture
- Functional status: Active
- Architect: Frederick Burwell
- Architectural type: Church
- Style: Gothic Revival
- Years built: 1873

Administration
- Province: Presbyterian Church of Aotearoa New Zealand
- Parish: Arrowtown

Heritage New Zealand – Category 2
- Official name: St John's Church (Presbyterian)
- Designated: 28 June 2012
- Reference no.: 2119

St John's Church is a heritage-listed Presbyterian church at Arrowtown, near Queenstown in New Zealand's South Island. Built in 1873 in the Gothic Revival style, the building was registered by Heritage New Zealand as a Category II building in 2012.

== Background ==
Gold was discovered on the Arrow River in 1862 and by the end of the year, a tent town had been established on a plateau near the head of the river at the foot of the Southern Alps. This became the permanent town of Arrowtown, for a time responsible for the administration of the surrounding goldfields. It became a municipality in 1874. There had been a Presbyterian presence in the region since 1865 and six years later, a church was proposed for Arrowtown. An organising committee was established and this included Reverend Donald Ross, the minister for the Wakatipu Parish. Fundraising commenced and an elevated plot of land along Berkshire Street was secured for the site of the church.

== History ==
In November 1872, tenders were put out for construction of the church to a design by Frederick Burwell. At the time Burwell was based in nearby Queenstown but was soon to move to Invercargill where he was a major influence in the modernisation of the town's business district. Peter Walker, a contractor from Queenstown, secured the tender and construction commenced early the following year.

The church was in the Gothic Revival style with the buttresses and gables typical of such buildings. Rectangular in form with the main body having a width dimension of 7 metres (23 ft) and length dimension of 12 metres (39 ft). Its frontage is configured with a porch and includes a trefoil window. The vestry, attached to the rear of the building, is constructed from timber and was built with a bedroom annex, to be used by traveling ministers. It was built of stacked schist, a technique used in many stone buildings built in the region. It was subsequently coated in Portland cement. Originally roofed with wooden shingles, these were later replaced with sheets of corrugated iron. The entrance way is an arch of Oamaru stone.

The interior of the roof of the church is lined with timber and supported by trusses of wood. The upper portion of the walls are coated with plaster while the lower portion is wooden paneling topped with a dado rail. The floor is timber although, in 1973, was overlaid with carpet.

With capacity for 120 people, St John's Church was opened on 6 July 1873. The first service was presided over by Ross, and by Reverend A. Stobo from Invercargill. The church underwent a restoration in 2011, as part of an overall project that added a hall to the rear of the site.

== Legacy ==
St John's Church was listed as a Category 2 Historic Place by Heritage New Zealand in June 2012, with its historical significance to Arrowtown cited as a factor in its listing. It was the first stone church in the town, representing a shift to more permanent buildings from the earlier temporary structures that exemplified the earliest buildings in Arrowtown.

A special service was held on 3 March 2024 to celebrate 150 years since the construction of St John's Church, with some parishioners dressing in period costume for the occasion. As of 2025, St John's Church continues to be in use as part of the Arrowtown Presbyterian Church parish, which was established in July 2025. Prior to then, it was in the Wakatipu parish.
