= Arrowtown Chinese Settlement =

Historic settlement in New Zealand

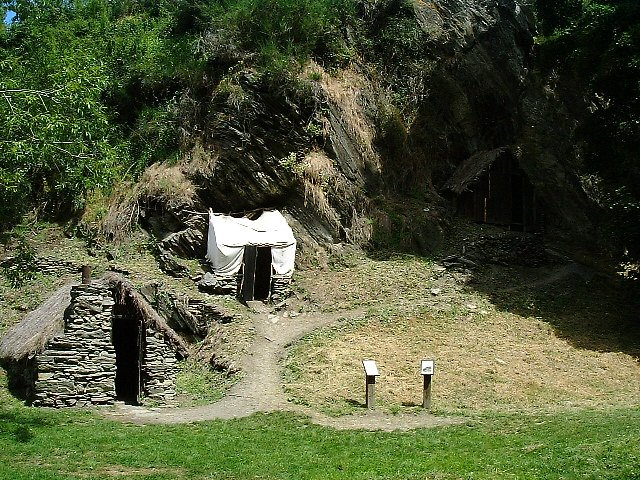
Some of the restored Chinese huts

The Arrowtown Chinese Settlement is a heritage listed, historic village located in Arrowtown, New Zealand, which was set up by Chinese people during the Otago gold rush of the 1860s. settlement is sometimes referred to as a village and has been restored and is now a common tourist attraction. It is close to Arrowtown on the banks of Bush Creek which is a tributary of the Arrow River.

== History ==
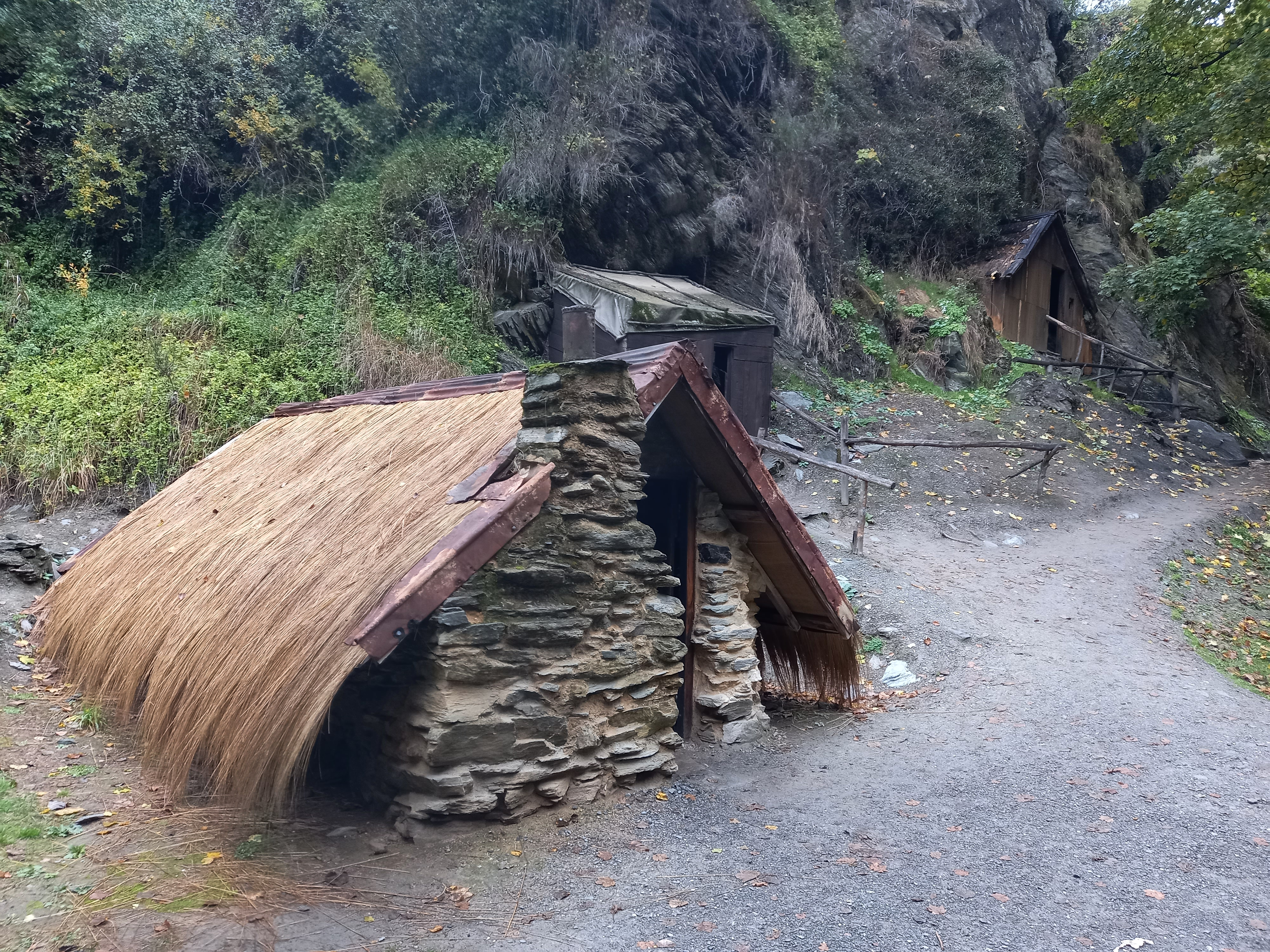
Gardens Hut

The village was one of at least ten Chinese settlements established in Otago for the purpose of gold mining in the 1800s. In 1865, the first Otago gold rush was over, and many European miners flocked to the newer goldfields of the West Coast in hopes of making a living there instead. Worries about Otago's economy post gold rush were expressed by the Provincial Council, who then invited Chinese miners from Victorian mines to continue mining the area. 1866 census data show a Chinese population of less than 200 in Otago, but this number grew by thousands in the following decades. By 1888, there were around 60 Chinese people living in the Arrowtown settlement. The settlement became the main hub for Chinese mining ventures in the Arrow River, Cardrona, and Macetown. Huts were built into the area's schist rock cliffs for protection and shelter. In 1885, the Arrowtown Chinese settlement had ten huts, at least two stores, and a town hall.

Chinese miners in Otago faced discrimination from European communities, and rarely made enough money to return home. Nearly all settlers were men. According to the 1881 census, only nine of 5004 Chinese settlers were women. By 1890, there was little gold remaining in Otago and most settlers returned to home if they could, while some tried their luck in the still active West coast mines or found work in the community. Some turned to farming and gardens were built in the community, and they applied traditional Chinese farming techniques. Soil was kept very fertile by animal manure and constant care. Commonly grown plants in the community were potatoes, cabbage, peas, corn, strawberries, and gooseberries.

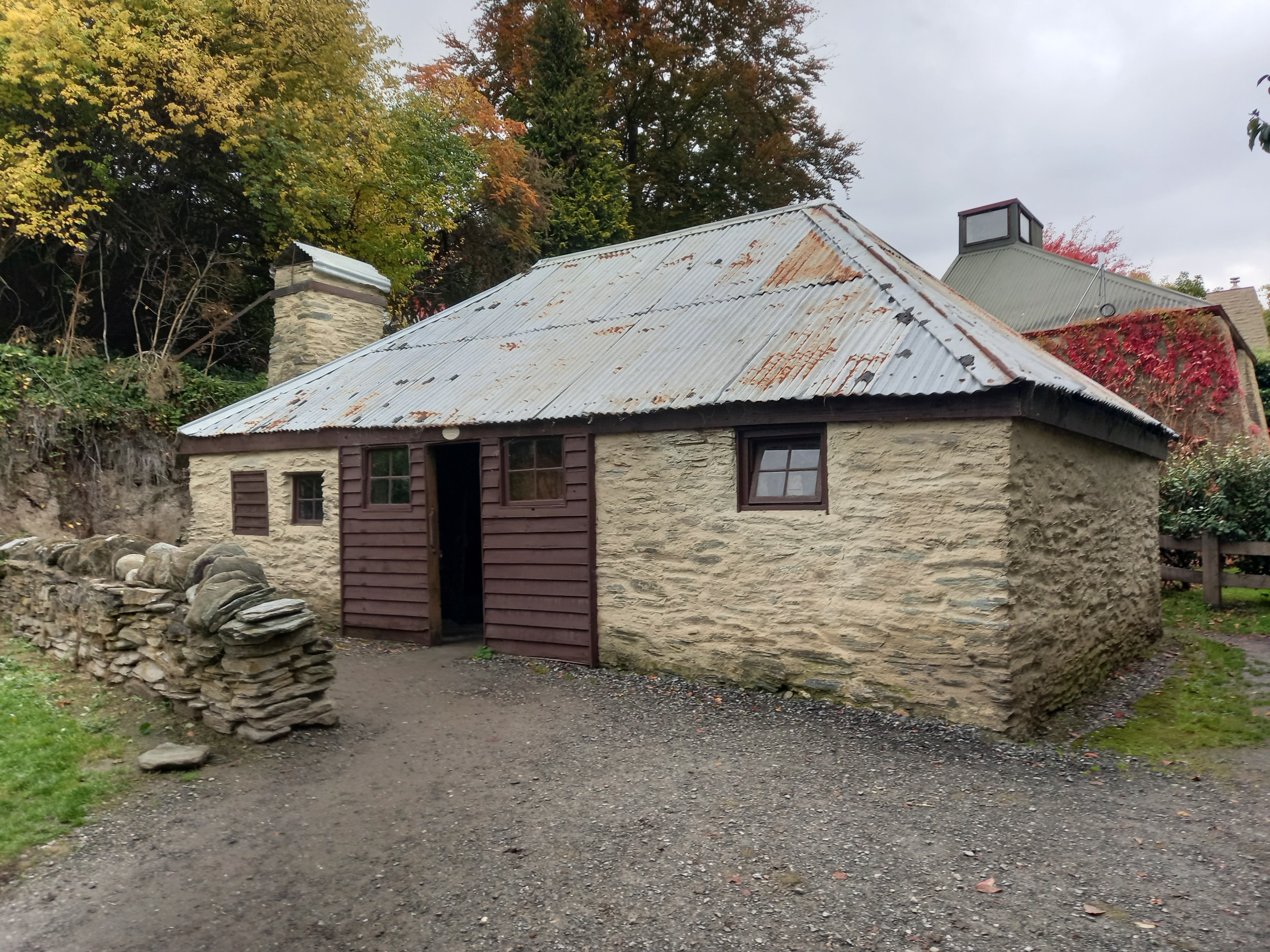
Ah Lum's Store

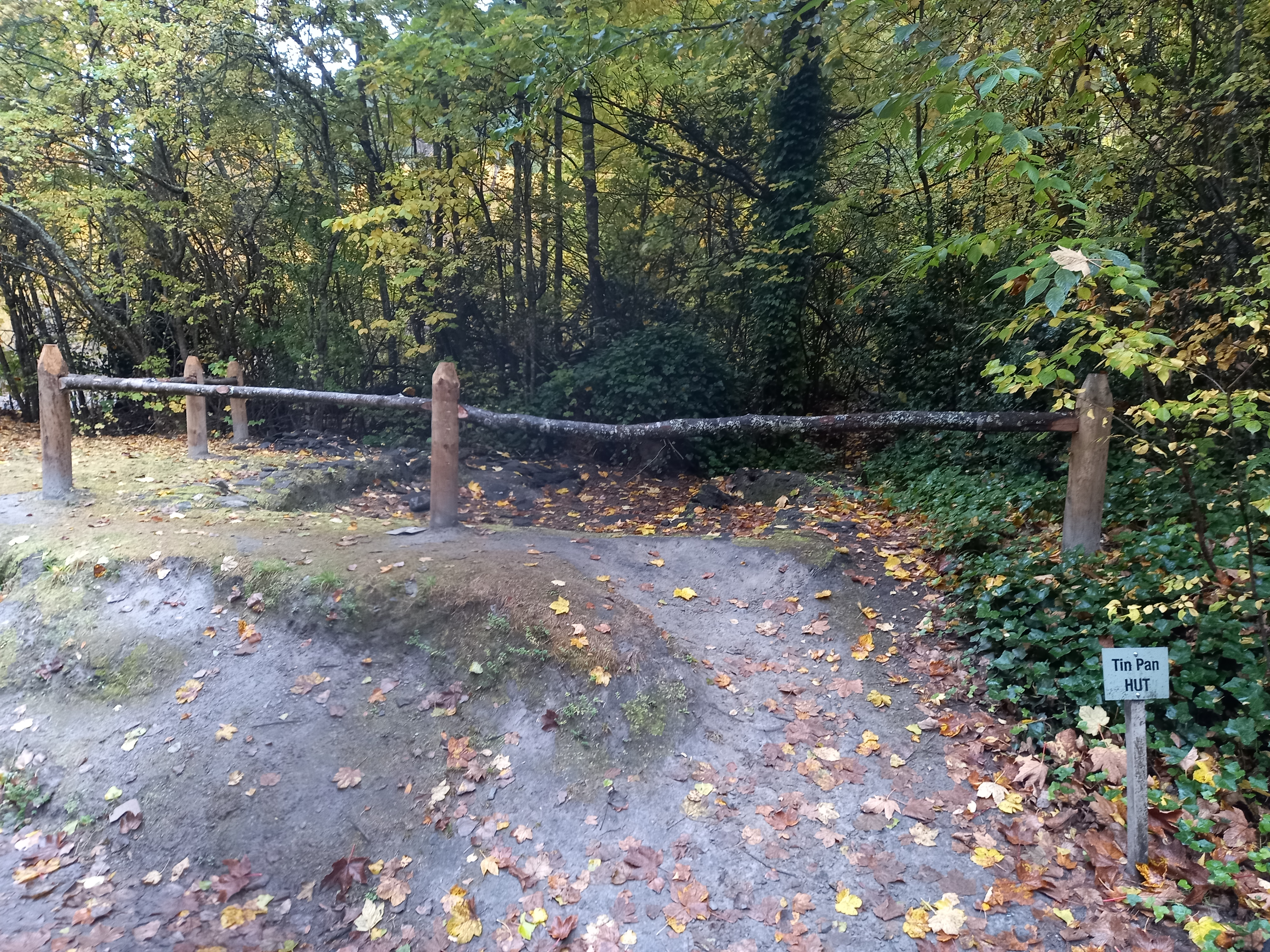
Tin Pan's Hut

Most residents of the Chinese Settlement were elderly by the 1890s after the era of gold mining in Otago, and many wanted to return to their homeland for death. Fundraising for the journey back to ancestral cemeteries was done by wealthier Chinese residents, but more could not afford to go back, and a ship carrying nearly 500 bodies sank off the coast of Hokianga in 1902.

== Recovery ==
In 1983, a major archaeological excavation restored multiple huts in the settlement, and all known hut sites have been stabilised. Five huts have been further reconstructed to better depict the state in which they were lived in.

== Notable people ==
Ah Lum is a well known example of the Chinese miners who lived in the area, and his store is a category 1 listed building by Heritage New Zealand. His store, one of few original huts in the settlement still standing, was initially built by gardener Wong Hop Lee circa 1883. Ah Lum acquired it in 1909, and worked there as a banker and shopkeeper until his death in 1925.

Tin Pan is known to have sold fresh vegetables to members of the community from baskets on a bamboo shoulder pole.
