= Christopher Mace =

Australian cricketer

Personal information
- Born: 24 December 1830; Bedale, Yorkshire, England
- Died: 23 November 1907 (aged 77); Sydenham, Christchurch, New Zealand
- Relatives: John Mace (brother); Harry Mace (brother)

Domestic team information
- Years: Team
- 1861/62: Victoria
- 1863/64: Otago
- Source: Cricinfo, 3 May 2015

Christopher Mace (24 December 1830 – 23 November 1907) was an English-born cricketer. He played one first-class cricket match in Australia for Victoria in the 1861–62 season and one in New Zealand for Otago during the 1863–64 season, the first match played in New Zealand which has been given first-class status.

Mace was born in England, at Bedale in Yorkshire, in 1830. His younger brother Harry was educated at Bedale School. The brothers, along with their older brother John Mace, emigrated, first to the Colony of Victoria in Australia and then, in the early 1860s, to New Zealand during the Otago gold rush. Christopher and Henry established a partnership to mine on the Arrow River in Northern Otago and the settlement of Macetown there is named after the three brothers. The partnership was dissolved in 1865, although Christopher stayed in the area, mining with Richard Canovan.

In 1883 Mace was appointed the manager of the Eureka gold mine at Terawhiti near Wellington on New Zealand's North Island.

In January 1862 Mace played cricket for Victoria against New South Wales in a match at the Melbourne Cricket Ground. In January 1864 he played in the first cricket match to have been awarded first-class status in New Zealand, a fixture between Otago and Canterbury played in Dunedin. His brother John played in the same match. He is known to have played other cricket matches whilst in Otago, including two matches against a touring English team and for an Arrow team captained by his brother Harry. In Victoria he had played against another touring English team led by HH Stephenson in January 1862.

Mace died at Addington, Christchurch in 1911 after contracting influenza as the result of suffering from bronchitis. He was aged 76.
