= Mary Jowett =

New Zealand architect

- Occupation: Architect
- Awards: Commercial Interior Office Colour Maestro Award, New Zealand Institute of Architects Award

Mary Louise Jowett is a New Zealand architect.

== Biography ==
Jowett's architectural practice is located in Queenstown; she works on residential, commercial and public projects in the area, including nearby Arrowtown.

=== Awards and recognition ===
- 2017 Resene Total Colour Awards: Commercial Interior Office Colour Maestro Award
- 2011 New Zealand Institute of Architects Award: for Frankton Bus Shelter and Public Toilets
