= Falk & Company Warehouse =

Heritage registered building in Fremantle, Western Australia

Customs House
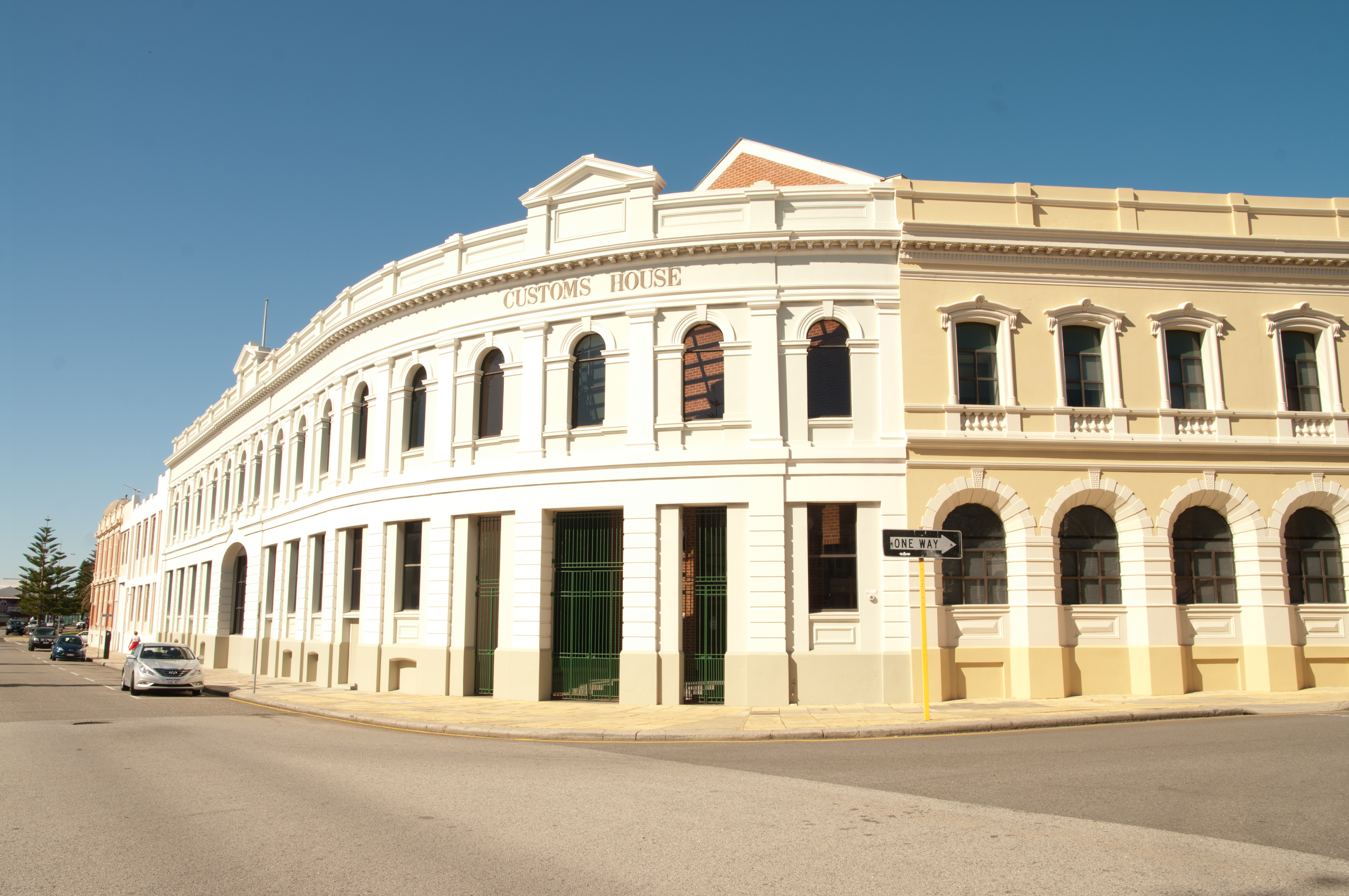
- Interactive map of the Customs House area
- Former names: Falk & Co. Warehouse; Woolworths Storehouse

General information
- Location: 32°03′14″S 115°44′38″E, Intersection of Henry, Pakenham and Phillimore streets (2 Henry, 41 Phillimore), Fremantle, Western Australia
- Construction started: 1888
- Renovated: 1985

Technical details
- Floor count: 3
- Floor area: 1,700 m^{2} (18,000 sq ft)

Design and construction
- Designations: Register of the National Estate

Renovating team
- Architect: F. W. Burwell (additions only)

Western Australia Heritage Register
- Type: State Registered Place
- Part of: West End, Fremantle (25225)
- Reference no.: 879

Customs House and former Falk & Company Warehouse is an historic three-storey brick building located in Fremantle, Western Australia. The building has a number of prominent ornate façades on Phillimore Street between Henry and Pakenham Streets. It houses the Fremantle regional office of the Australian Customs and Border Protection Service, Centrelink, and a number of other Australian Government offices.

== History ==
The Customs House was built in 1985 on the site of a number of Victorian warehouses and offices, with only the facades of these being retained and the entire interior of the site being demolished and rebuilt. The most prominent of these older buildings, and the one whose façade now serves as the main entrance to the Customs House, was that of P. Faulk and Co.

=== P. Falk and Co. ===
This warehouse was built in 1888 on land that had recently become available as a result of the reclamation of the bank of the Swan River for the Fremantle railway line. It was extended by Frederick William Burwell in 1896, and again in 1903; these additions were the bulk of the extant corner façade on the corner of Henry and Philimore streets.

In September 1895 there was a fire in the building, but due to the quick response of the fire brigade and a special regulating firehose nozzle invented and built by the Fremantle fire superintendent (JC Frazer), only £200 damage was done.

The building was owned by James Lilly from about 1909 until World War II, when the United States Navy used it as a storage location.

== Other buildings ==
Other 19th century buildings were mostly demolished to make way for the modern Customs House, such as Tolley and Co. wine merchants.
