= Victoria Pavilion =

Victoria Pavilion may refer to:

- Victoria Pavilion (Fremantle)
- Victoria Arena (Calgary)
