= Henry Mace =

New Zealand cricketer

Harry Mace
Personal information
- Born: 4 June 1837; Bedale, Yorkshire, England
- Died: 19 July 1902 (aged 65); New Brighton, Christchurch, New Zealand
- Relatives: John Mace (brother); Christopher Mace (brother)

Domestic team information
- Years: Team
- 1877/78: Wellington
- Source: Cricinfo, 24 October 2020

Henry Mace (4 June 1837 – 19 July 1902) was a New Zealand cricketer. He played in one first-class match for Wellington in the 1877–78 season.

Harry Mace was born in England, at Bedale in Yorkshire, in 1837 and educated at Bedale School. Along with his older brothers John and Christopher Mace, he emigrated, first to the Colony of Victoria in Australia and then, in the early 1860s, to New Zealand during the Otago gold rush—Harry travelling first to New Zealand in 1861. Christopher and Harry established a partnership to mine on the Arrow River in Northern Otago and the settlement of Macetown there is named after the three brothers. The partnership was dissolved in 1865, although Christopher stayed in the area, mining with Richard Canovan.

Harry Mace later developed a business as a manufacturer of cordial. He died in 1902 at New Brighton in Christchurch aged 65 of rheumatic fever.
