= John Mace (English cricketer) =

English-born Australian cricketer

Personal information
- Born: 28 December 1828; Bedale, Yorkshire, England
- Died: 30 April 1905 (aged 76); Te Aroha, New Zealand
- Batting: Right-handed
- Bowling: Left-arm medium
- Relatives: Christopher Mace (brother); Harry Mace (brother)

Domestic team information
- Years: Team
- 1860/61: Victoria
- 1863/64: Otago
- Source: Cricinfo, 3 May 2015

John Mace (28 December 1828 – 30 April 1905). He was an English-born cricketer who played for Victoria and Otago. Mace played twice at a level later classified as first-class cricket, one each for Victoria and Otago.

John Mace was born in England, at Bedale in Yorkshire, in 1828. His younger brother Harry was educated at Bedale School. The brothers, along with their other brother Christopher Mace, emigrated, first to the Colony of Victoria in Australia and then, in the early 1860s, to New Zealand during the Otago gold rush—Harry travelling first to New Zealand in 1861. Christopher and Harry established a partnership to mine on the Arrow River in Northern Otago and the settlement of Macetown there is named after the three brothers. John later developed a business as a farmer. He died in 1905 at Te Aroha aged 76.
