= Fowler's Warehouse =

Heritage listed building in Fremantle, Western Australia

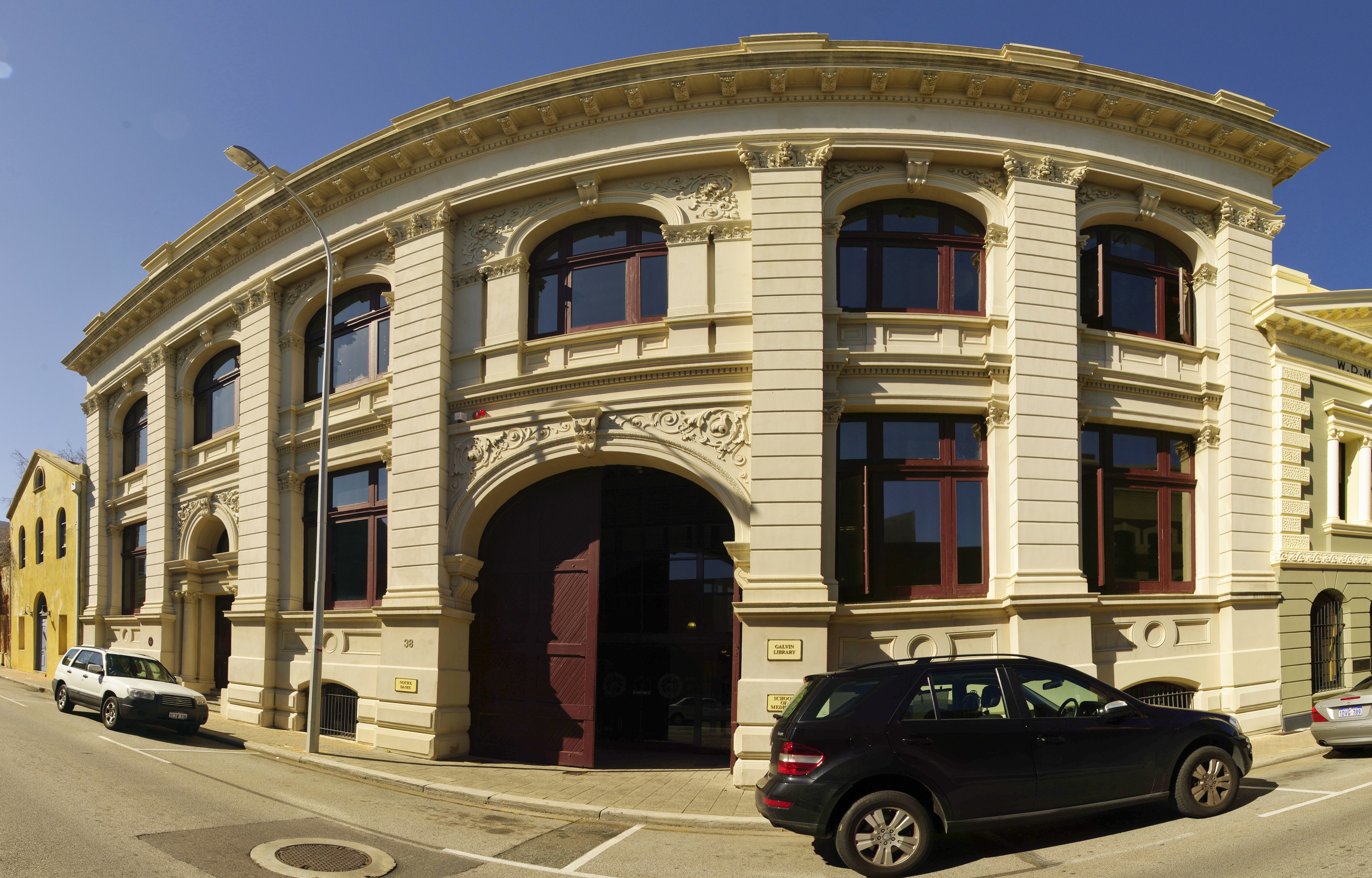
- Interactive map of the Fowler's Warehouse area
- Alternative names: Fremantle Furniture Factory

General information
- Location: Henry Street back through to Pakenham Street, Henry Street, Fremantle, Fremantle, Australia
- Coordinates: 32°03′20″S 115°44′41″E
- Opened: 1900
- Client: D&J Fowler Ltd
- Owner: City of Fremantle

Design and construction
- Architect: Frederick William Burwell

Western Australia Heritage Register
- Type: State Registered Place
- Designated: 9 November 1993
- Part of: West End, Fremantle (25225)
- Reference no.: 889

Fowler's Warehouse, also known as the Fremantle Furniture Factory, was constructed in 1900 as the principal premises in Western Australia for D. & J. Fowler Ltd. Principally on Henry Street in Fremantle, the building extends through to Pakenham Street, and comprises offices, warehouse, engine room packing and coffee roasting house, stables and sheds. Local architect Frederick William Burwell designed the building. Burwell also designed the Central Chambers, Sail and Anchor Hotel, Victoria Pavilion, Owston's Buildings and Marmion House.

The City of Fremantle purchased the property in 1971 and leased it to a wool stores company. In 1991–1992 the City undertook restoration of the buildings.
