= Central Chambers (Fremantle) =

Heritage listed building in Fremantle, Western Australia

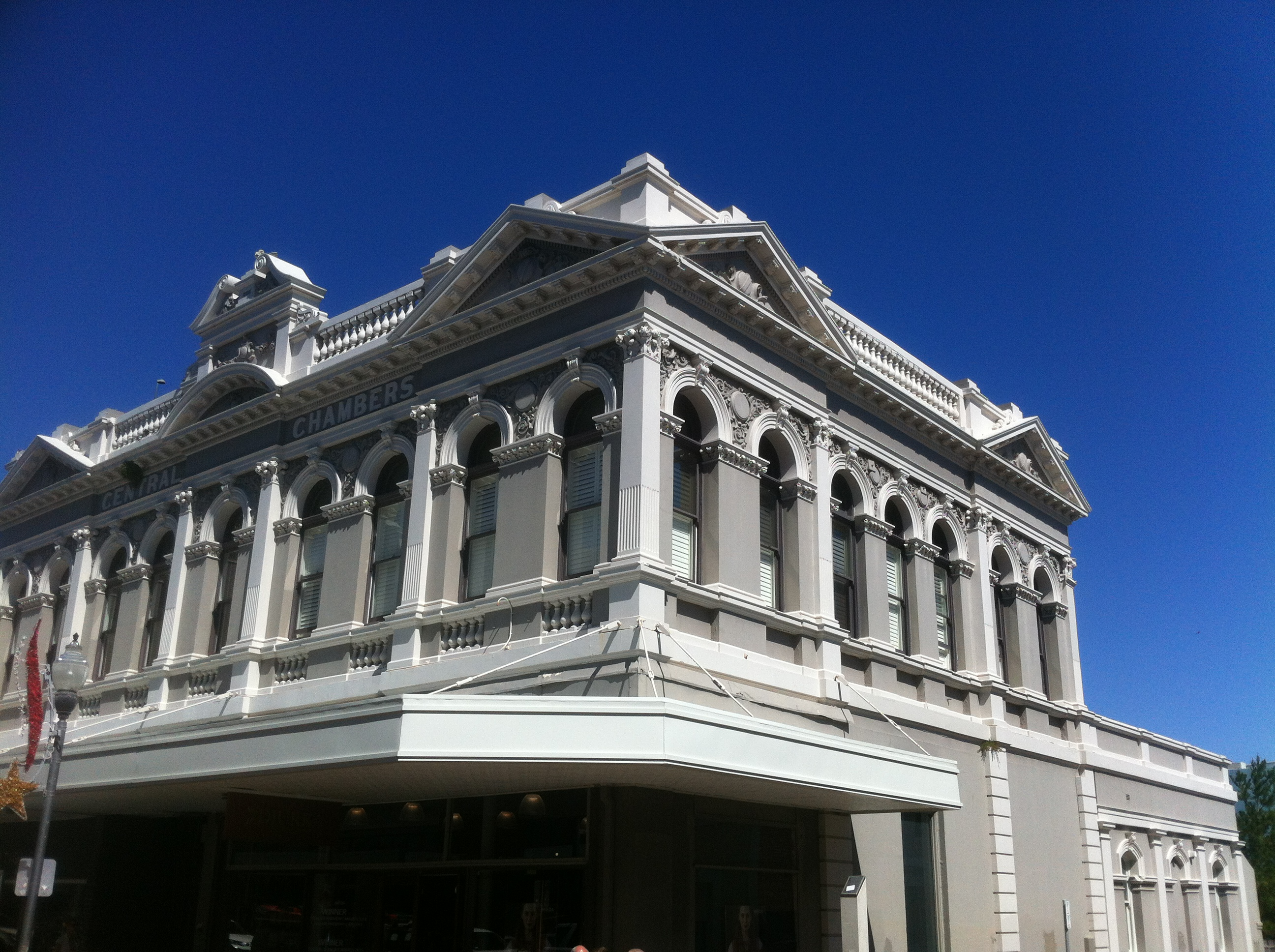
- Central Chambers building in 2016
- Interactive map of the Central Chambers area

General information
- Location: 61–63 High Street, Fremantle, Western Australia
- Coordinates: 32°03′16.9″S 115°44′42.6″E
- Construction started: 1906
- Completed: 1907
- Opened: April 1907
- Client: W.S & G.Pearse

Height
- Architectural: Federation Free Classical

Design and construction
- Architect: F. W. Burwell
- Main contractor: R. Rennie

Western Australia Heritage Register
- Type: State Registered Place
- Designated: 19 November 1993
- Part of: West End, Fremantle (25225)
- Reference no.: 917

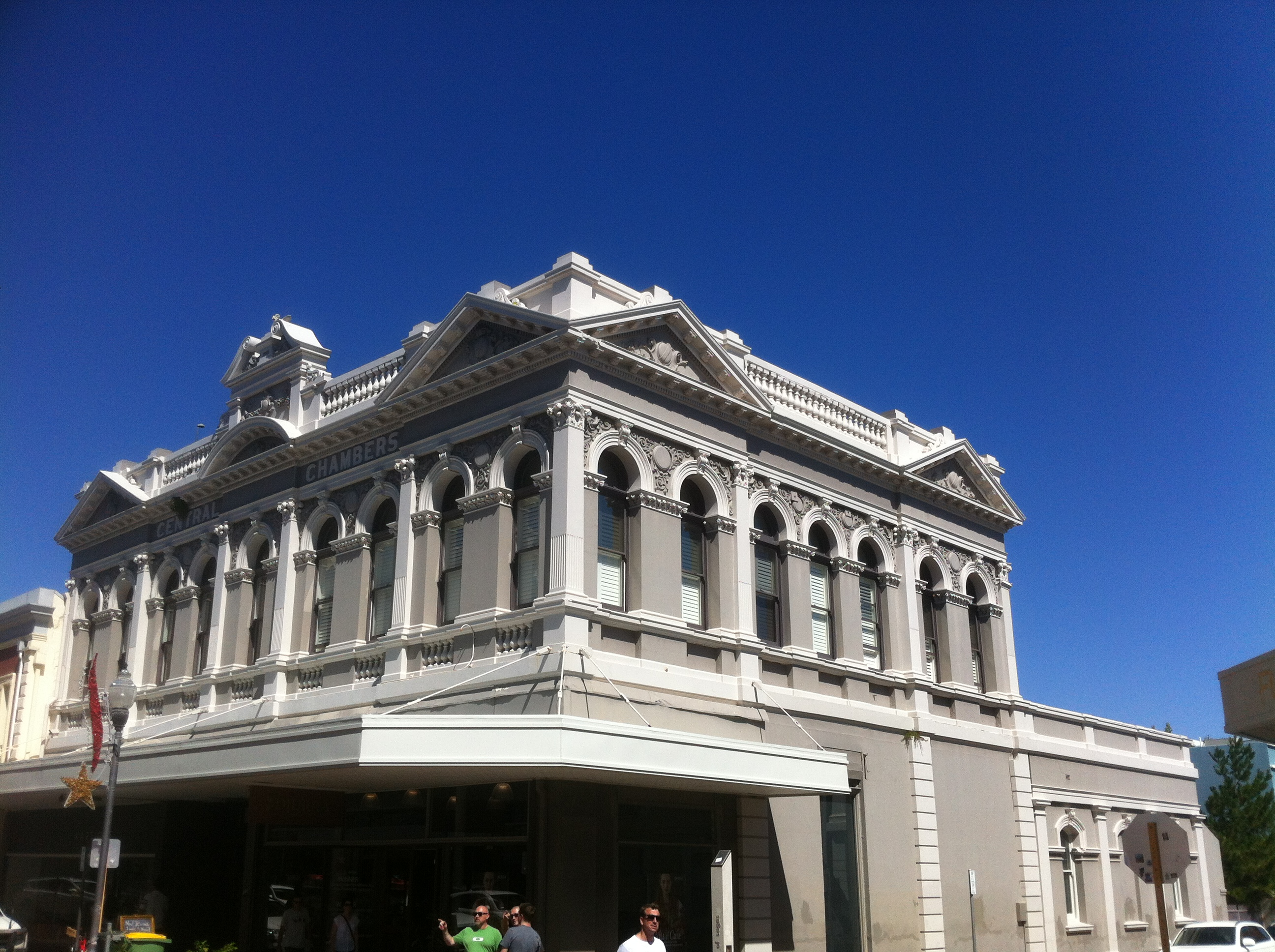
Central Chambers 2016

Central Chambers is a heritage listed building located at 61–63 High Street on the corner of Pakenham Street in Fremantle, Western Australia. It was one of many commercial buildings constructed in Fremantle during the gold boom period in the late nineteenth and early twentieth century.

== History ==
Construction of the building commenced in 1906 and was completed in 1907. it was extensively restored in 1991. It is a Federation Free Classical style design.

A butcher named William Pearse had a shop on the site dating from the 1850s. This was followed by a two-storey building Georgian style building with she-oak shingled roof, later replaced with corrugated iron and verandahs in the 1870s and then demolished in 1906 to make way for the current building.

Central Chambers was built by the contractor Richard Rennie, who had previously built Owston's Buildings in 1903 and the National Hotel in 1895. It was designed by architect Frederick William Burwell who also designed the Victoria Pavilion, Sail and Anchor Hotel, Fowler's Warehouse, Owston's Buildings and Marmion House. The superintendent of works was W. Sefton. The clients for the building were George and William Silas Pearse, and the building originally contained a range of shops and offices. The building is constructed of brickwork throughout resting on a basecourse of rusticated bluestone. It features a decorative façade on the first floor exterior featuring Central Chambers in stucco. The paired windows feature stucco and pilastered and stucco arches with elaborate decorations above and piers below. The parapet has a balustrade and five highly decorative pediments extending below. The original entrance is still located between the shops and features stained glass leadlight sidelights and French doors between. Originally the entrance hall and vestibule lead to the shops and offices, the staircase being made from polished jarrah. Tiles in different colours have been used for dados, corridors and decorations. The building is embellished in the Italian Renaissance style.

It originally had frontal verandahs, but which were removed 1952. J & W Bateman, owners of the building in 1957, added a loading ramp to the rear of the building.

A blaze broke out on the second storey in 1954 but was under control in about 20 minutes. During this time it caused damage estimated at well over £A 2000, equivalent to A$78,339 in 2022.

In 2016 the tenants of the building were a fashion store, Love in Tokyo, and a beauty treatment centre, Djurra Spa.

== See also ==
List of heritage places in Fremantle
