= Sail and Anchor =

Hotel in Fremantle, Western Australia

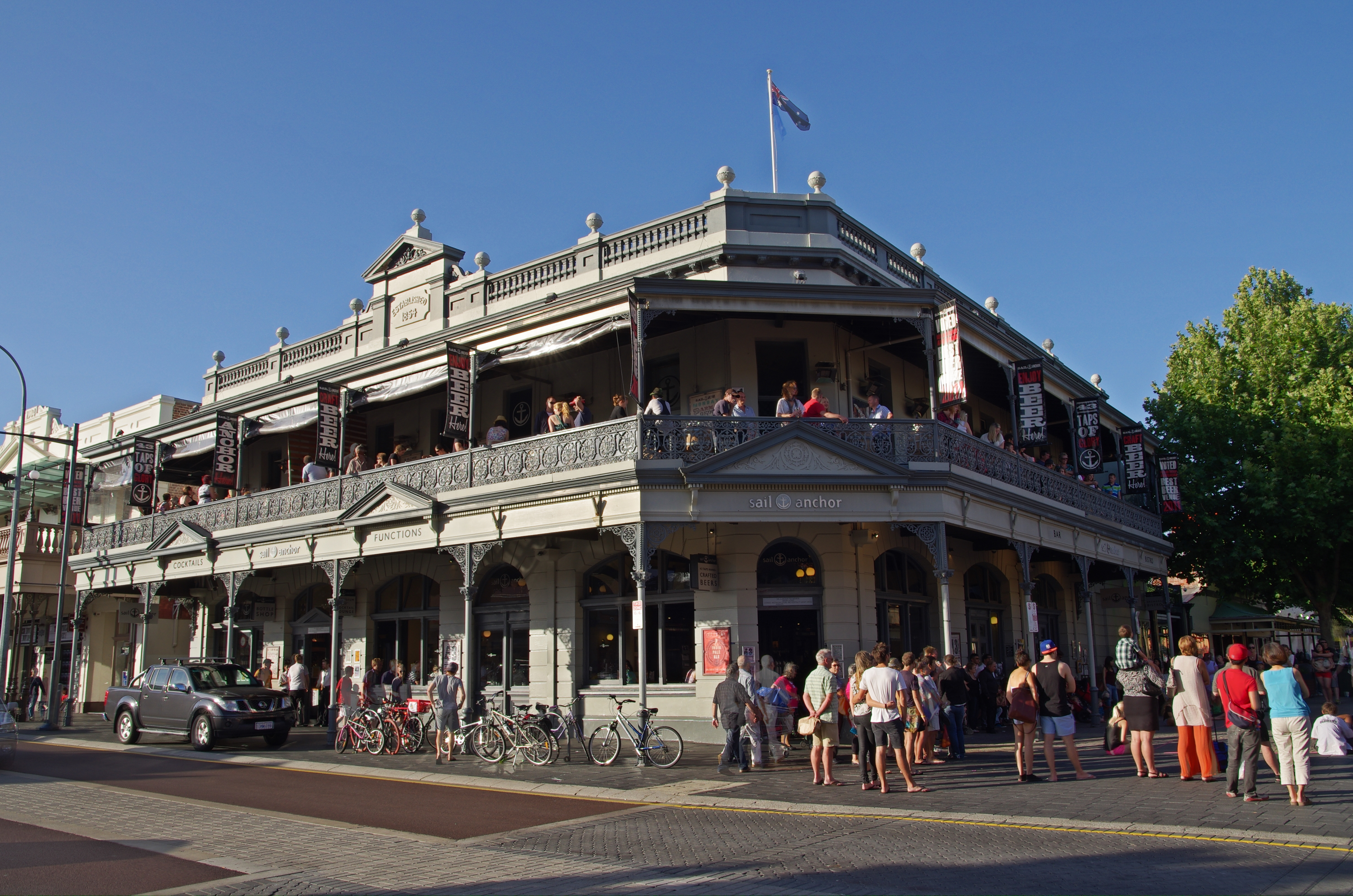
- Alternative names: Freemasons Hotel

General information
- Architectural style: Federation Filigree
- Location: Corner South Terrace and Henderson Street, 64 South Terrace, Fremantle, Fremantle
- Coordinates: 32°03′22″S 115°44′55″E
- Construction started: 1902
- Completed: 1903
- Opened: 1903
- Renovated: 1920s, 1955, 1985-86
- Owner: James Gallop

Technical details
- Floor count: 2

Design and construction
- Architect: F. W. Burwell
- Architecture firm: Burwell & McNeece
- Main contractor: William Reynolds

Renovating team
- Architect: Michael Patroni

Website
- www.sailandanchor.com.au

Western Australia Heritage Register
- Type: State Registered Place
- Designated: 9 February 1996
- Reference no.: 1002

The Sail and Anchor is a pub located on the corner of South Terrace and Henderson Street in Fremantle, Western Australia, opposite the Fremantle Markets. It is owned by the Australian Leisure and Hospitality Group (ALH).

== History ==
The Freemasons' Hotel, was constructed in 1901–1903. It replaced the hotel that was originally constructed on the site in 1854 for Nicholas Paterson and Anthony Cornish. In 1901, James Gallop purchased the Freemasons' Hotel property and commissioned architect Frederick William Burwell to design a new hotel for the site. Burwell also designed the Central Chambers, Victoria Pavilion, Fowler's Warehouse, Owston's Buildings and Marmion House. The construction was undertaken by William Reynolds and was carried out in stages so that the hotel could continue to trade. In the 1920s, a first floor wing was added to the western side of the hotel. In 1955, the veranda and balcony was removed and replaced with a suspended awning.

In 1923 the Swan Brewery purchased the hotel from William Padbury, retaining ownership of it until 1977. In April 1984, the Freemasons' Hotel was sold to Brewtech Ltd who undertook a major restoration and upgrading of the hotel, converting it into Australia's first boutique pub brewery, and renaming it the Sail and Anchor in 1986. The renovations included the restoration of the veranda and balcony.

In 1990 Elders IXL purchased the Matilda Bay Brewing Company (formerly Brewtech Ltd), in a deal that valued Matilda Bay at more than A$50 million, selling the hotel to the Australian Leisure and Hospitality Group (ALH), a subsidiary of the Woolworths conglomerate, who subsequently closed the micro-brewery operations at the hotel for a short time after 2010, however the micro-brewing has since resumed.
