= Ah Lum =

Merchant in Arrowtown, New Zealand

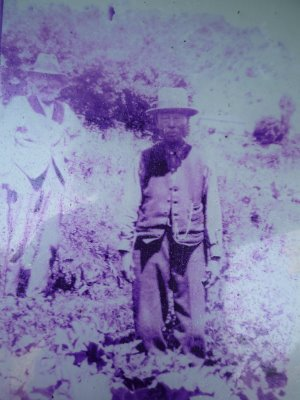
- Born: before 1909; China
- Died: 1925; Arrowtown, New Zealand
- Occupations: Store Owner, Gold Miner

Ah Lum (before 1909–1925) was a gold miner and store owner in Arrowtown, New Zealand.

== Personal life ==
Ah Lum was born in China, and later moved to New Zealand where he opened a store in the Otago town of Arrowtown. He was a well-respected leader in the Chinese mining community at Arrowtown, and served as an interpreter between the Chinese and European peoples. Ah Lum became a local hero after he saved the life of a European miner who was drowning in the Shotover River.

== Store ==
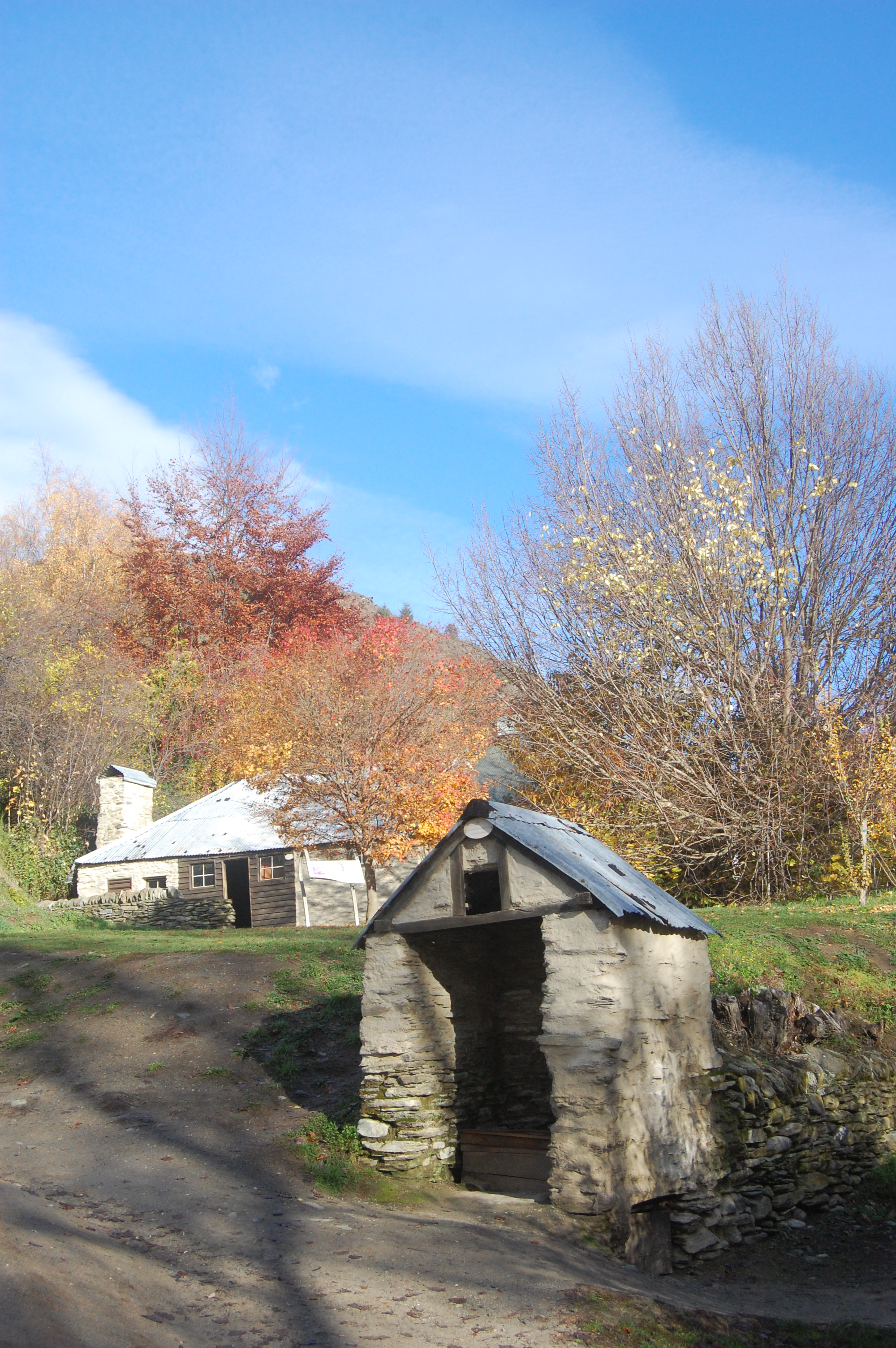
Ah Lum's store

Ah Lum's store was built from mortared stone rubble with an iron roof. Inside, there were five rooms, as well as a loft space. His store was one of the few original buildings in the Chinese settlement to remain standing. Ah Lum acquired the store in 1909, and the building began to serve as a shop, a bank, a place for socialising, and as accommodation for both travellers and visitors. The store stocked both Asian and European supplies.

== Legacy ==
After Ah Lum's death in 1925 (some sources say 1927), the store closed and the Chinese community disappeared. The building was restored in 1986, and is now registered as a Category I Historic Place.
