= Victoria Pavilion (Fremantle) =

Heritage listed building in Fremantle, Western Australia

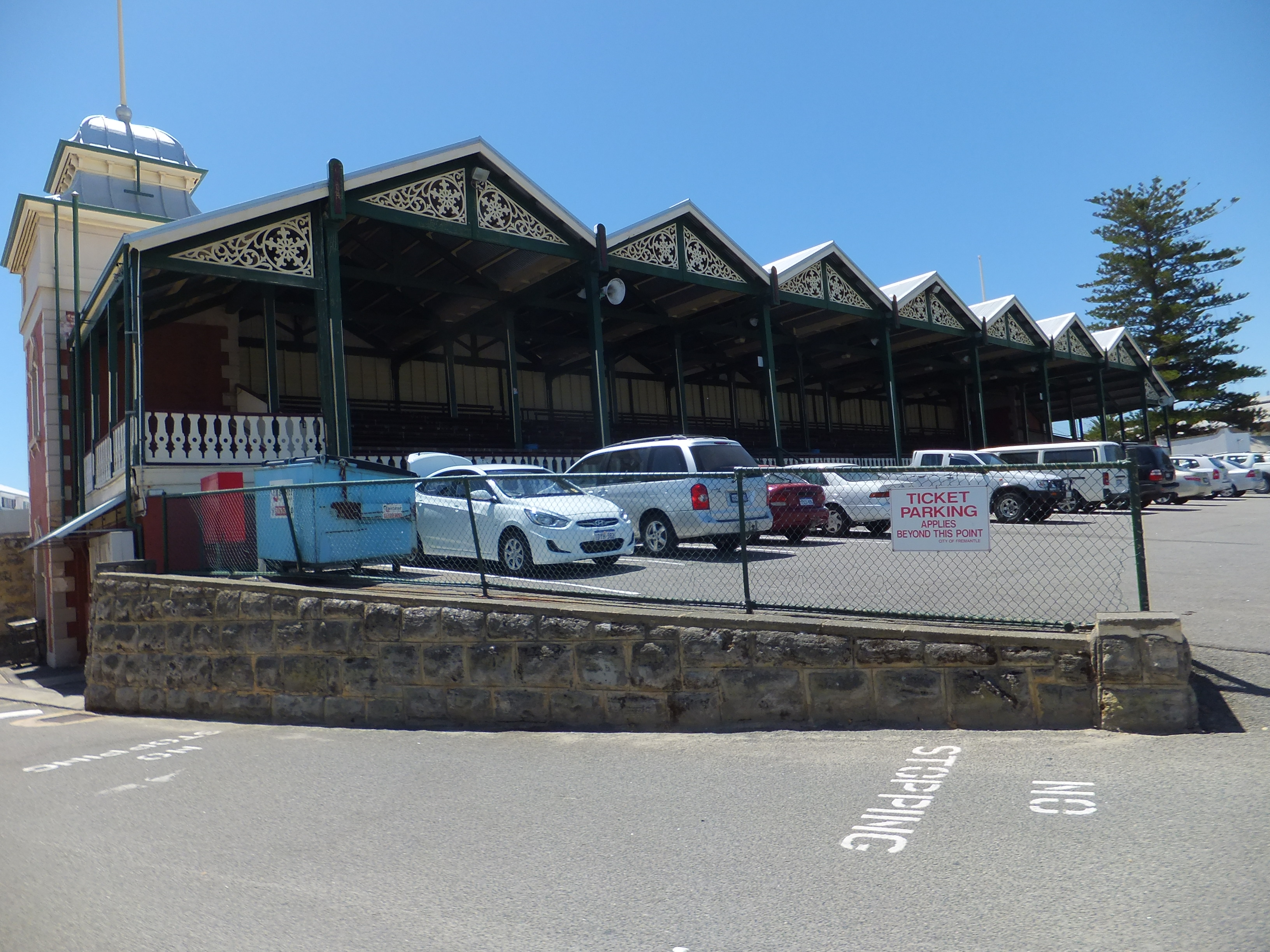
- Interactive map of the Victoria Pavilion area
- Alternative names: Fremantle Oval

General information
- Status: Heritage listed
- Location: Parry Street, Fremantle, Australia
- Coordinates: 32°03′22″S 115°45′00″E
- Current tenants: Fremantle Football Club, South Fremantle Football Club
- Groundbreaking: 25 June 1897
- Opened: 6 November 1897
- Cost: £3650
- Client: City of Fremantle
- Owner: City of Fremantle

Other information
- Seating type: Timber bench

Western Australia Heritage Register
- Type: State Registered Place
- Designated: 9 November 1993
- Reference no.: 874

Victoria Pavilion is a historic grandstand located on the western side of Fremantle Oval, in Fremantle, Western Australia.

In January 1897, local architect Frederick William Burwell won the competition held by the Fremantle Council for the design of a pavilion for Fremantle Oval. Burwell also designed the Central Chambers, Sail and Anchor Hotel, Fowler's Warehouse, Owston's Buildings and Marmion House.

The foundation stone was laid on 25 June 1897 to celebrate Queen Victoria's Diamond Jubilee. Built by Blackman Brothers at a cost of £3650, equivalent to A$628,780 in 2022, the pavilion was officially opened by Premier John Forrest on 6 November 1897.

The building is listed on the Register of the National Estate.
