= Arrowtown =

Historic mining town in South Island, New Zealand

Arrowtown Kā-muriwai (Māori)
- Town
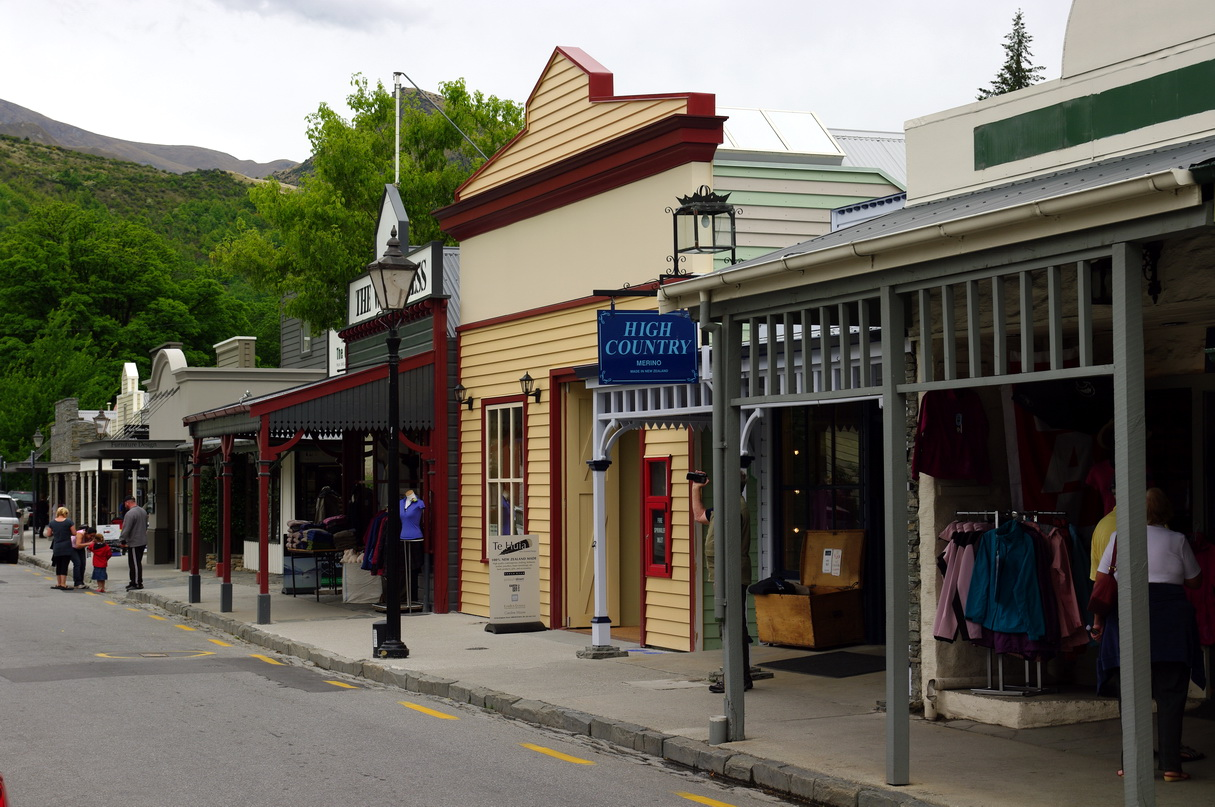
- Buckingham Street, Arrowtown's main shopping street
- Interactive map of Arrowtown
- Coordinates: 44°56′33″S 168°50′09″E
- Country: New Zealand
- Region: Otago
- Territorial authority: Queenstown-Lakes District
- Ward: Arrowtown-Kawarau Ward
- Electorates: Southland; Te Tai Tonga (Māori)

Government
  - Territorial authority: Queenstown-Lakes District Council
  - Regional council: Otago Regional Council
  - Mayor of Queenstown-Lakes: John Glover
  - Southland MP: Joseph Mooney
  - Te Tai Tonga MP: Mananui Ramsden

Area
  - Town: 3.61 km^{2} (1.39 sq mi)
  - District: 8,719.66 km^{2} (3,366.68 sq mi)

Population (June 2025)
  - Urban: 2,860
  - District: 53,800
- Time zone: UTC+12 (NZST)
  - Summer (DST): UTC+13 (NZDT)
- Postcode(s): 9302
- Area code: 03
- Local iwi: Ngāi Tahu

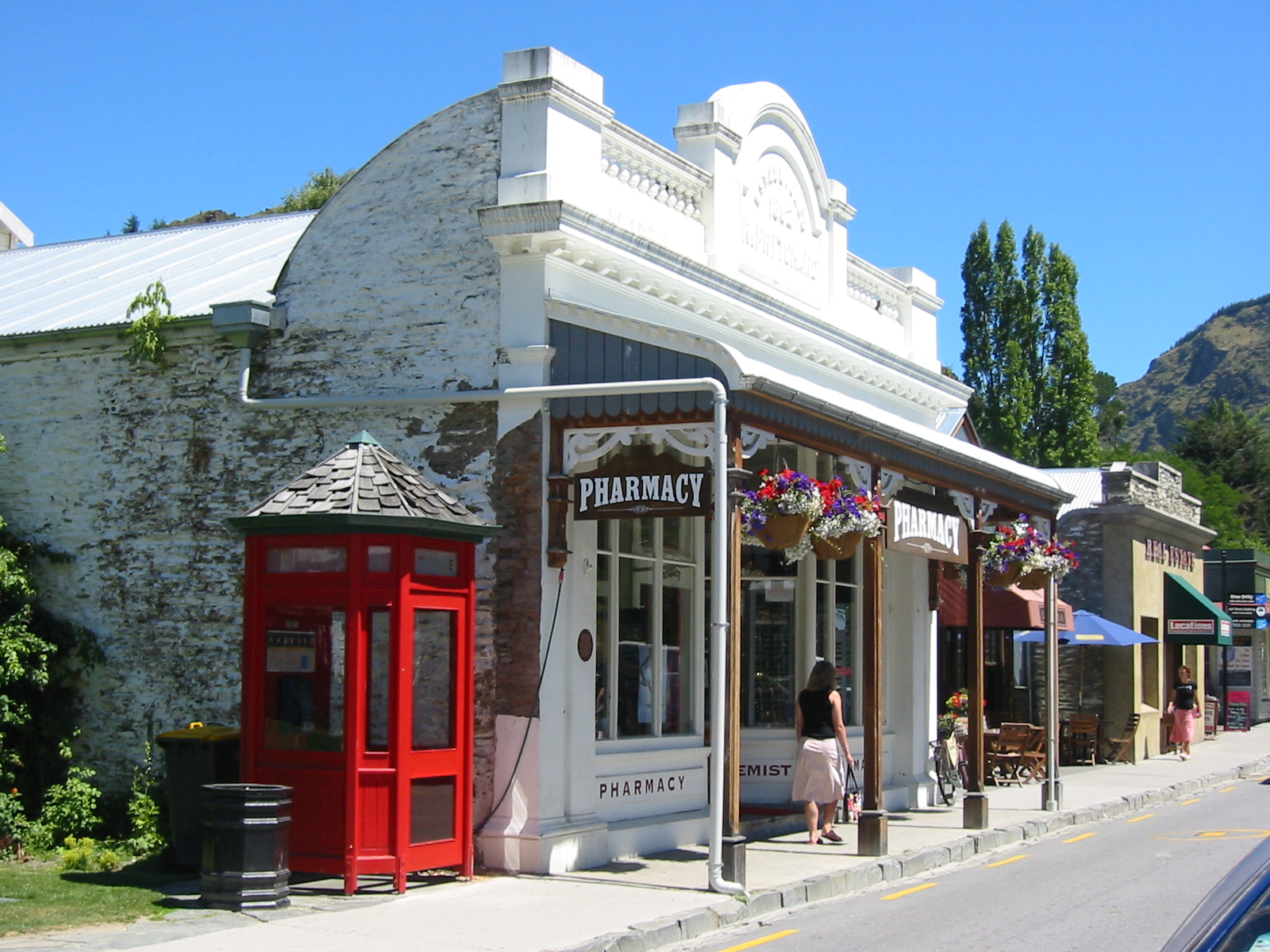
Amcal Arrowtown pharmacy

Arrowtown (Māori: Kā-muriwai) is a historic gold mining town in the Otago region of the South Island of New Zealand. Arrowtown is located on the banks of the Arrow River (Māori: Haehaenui) approximately 7.5 km from State Highway 6. Arrowtown is located 19.5 kilometres to the east of Queenstown. It is reached by roads leading from State Highway 6 at Arrow Junction, or from Queenstown via Arthurs Point or Lake Hayes.

There are many well preserved buildings that were used by the European and Chinese immigrants who settled during the town's gold mining era.

== History ==
In August 1862 Jack Tewa (known as Maori Jack) found gold in the Arrow River, and a township of 800 miners soon sprang up. It was initially named Fox's, based on William Fox's claim to have been first to find gold there, but was soon renamed Arrowtown. The area had only a dozen policemen to manage the thousands of miners in the district and lawlessness was an issue in the town until a police camp and warden's office were constructed and the town became more orderly. Several hotels existed in the town in 1863, including William Fox's Golden Age hotel. The original buildings were of a temporary nature and made from calico but as the gold and town population remained stable more permanent structures were erected.

Chinese settlers, who first arrived in the 1870s in Arrowtown were forced to live in huts on the banks of Bush Creek. At the high point of the gold rush, the population of Arrowtown rose to over 7,000 and it became the centre of a larger municipality, which covered the new settlements of Macetown, Skippers Canyon and Bullendale (today only ghost towns).

Arrowtown was constituted as a borough in 1867. In 1874, the first mayor was elected. This was Samuel Goldston. A large fire burned down Campbell's bakery, the Morning Star Hotel and a significant portion of Pritchard's Store in 1896.

In 1888, the name of Arrowtown had yet to be finalised with the local post office calling the town Arrow River, while the telegraph office referring to the town as Arrowtown.

After the gold rush ended, Arrowtown provided services to the local farms.

Arrowtown was named "the most beautiful small town" in New Zealand in the 2020 Keep New Zealand Beautiful awards.

== Climate ==
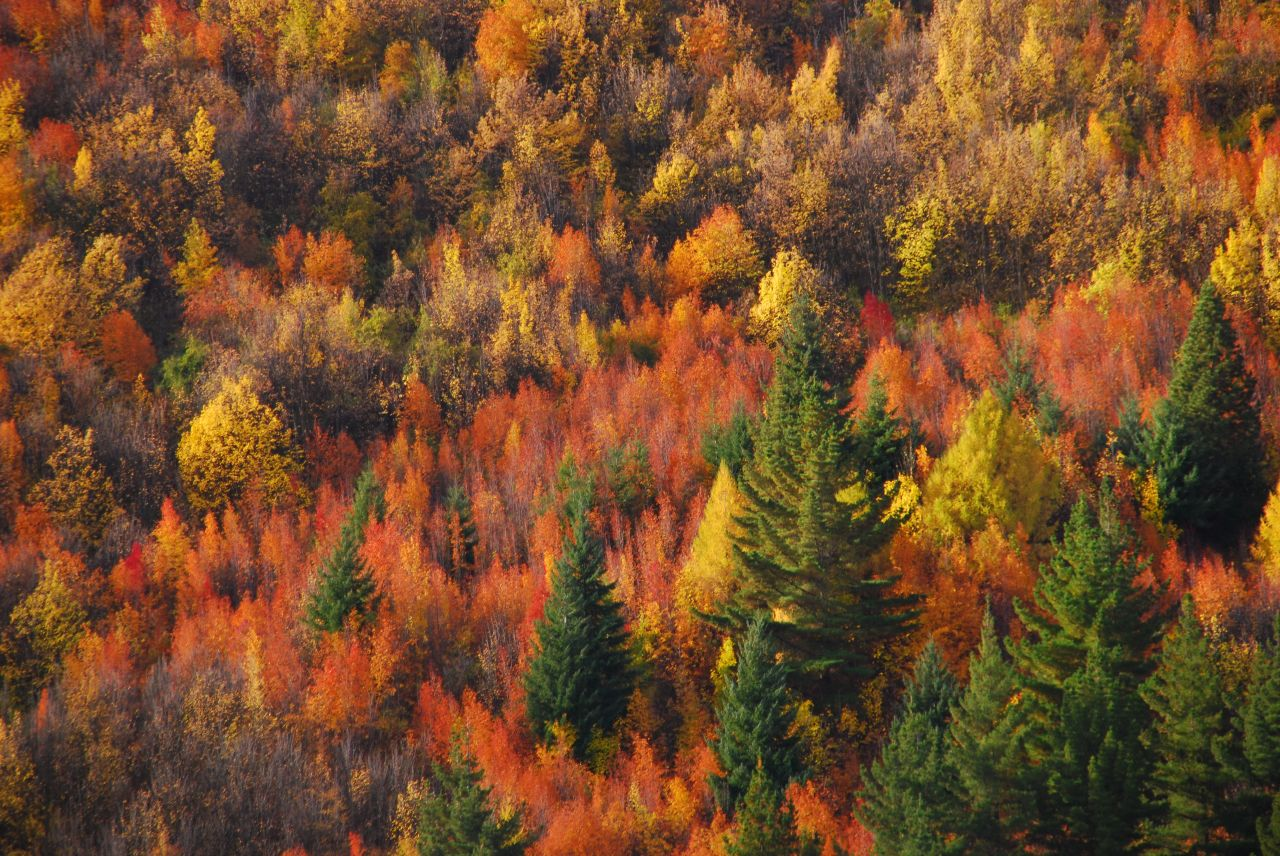
Autumn colours in Arrowtown, May 2008.

The main street of Arrowtown, Buckingham Street, sits at 410 metres above sea level. Arrowtown has been described as having four distinct seasons. The driest month of the year is February with 96mm of rain on average and the wettest month of the year is December with 144mm of rain on average. January is the warmest month of the year with an average maximum temperature of 16 and 18 degrees Celsius. July is the coolest month of the year with an average maximum temperature of 5 degrees Celsius.

== Population ==
Arrowtown covers 3.61 km^{2} (1.39 sq mi) and had an estimated population of 2,860 as of June 2025, with a population density of 792 people per km^{2}.

In 1951, the population of Arrowtown was 200 people, and this fell to 186 people in 1956 and 171 people in 1961 before increasing in size again. Despite the growth and construction, it falls under strict appearance covenants applied by the local authority that aim to preserve the appearance of the town.

Historical population
| Year | Pop. | ±% p.a. |
|---|---|---|
| 2006 | 2,148 | — |
| 2013 | 2,445 | +1.87% |
| 2018 | 2,814 | +2.85% |

Before the 2023 census, Arrowtown had a smaller boundary, covering 2.36 km^{2} (0.91 sq mi). Using that boundary, Arrowtown had a population of 2,814 at the 2018 New Zealand census, an increase of 369 people (15.1%) since the 2013 census, and an increase of 666 people (31.0%) since the 2006 census. There were 993 households, comprising 1,422 males and 1,392 females, giving a sex ratio of 1.02 males per female. The median age was 38.3 years (compared with 37.4 years nationally), with 588 people (20.9%) aged under 15 years, 450 (16.0%) aged 15 to 29, 1,443 (51.3%) aged 30 to 64, and 333 (11.8%) aged 65 or older.

Ethnicities were 90.2% European/Pākehā, 6.1% Māori, 1.5% Pasifika, 5.0% Asian, and 3.7% other ethnicities. People may identify with more than one ethnicity.

The percentage of people born overseas was 27.9, compared with 27.1% nationally.

Although some people chose not to answer the census's question about religious affiliation, 61.1% had no religion, 31.1% were Christian, 0.3% had Māori religious beliefs, 0.5% were Hindu, 0.1% were Muslim, 0.5% were Buddhist and 1.7% had other religions.

Of those at least 15 years old, 606 (27.2%) people had a bachelor's or higher degree, and 216 (9.7%) people had no formal qualifications. The median income was $45,300, compared with $31,800 nationally. 534 people (24.0%) earned over $70,000 compared to 17.2% nationally. The employment status of those at least 15 was that 1,425 (64.0%) people were employed full-time, 372 (16.7%) were part-time, and 27 (1.2%) were unemployed.

== Arrowtown Chinese settlement ==
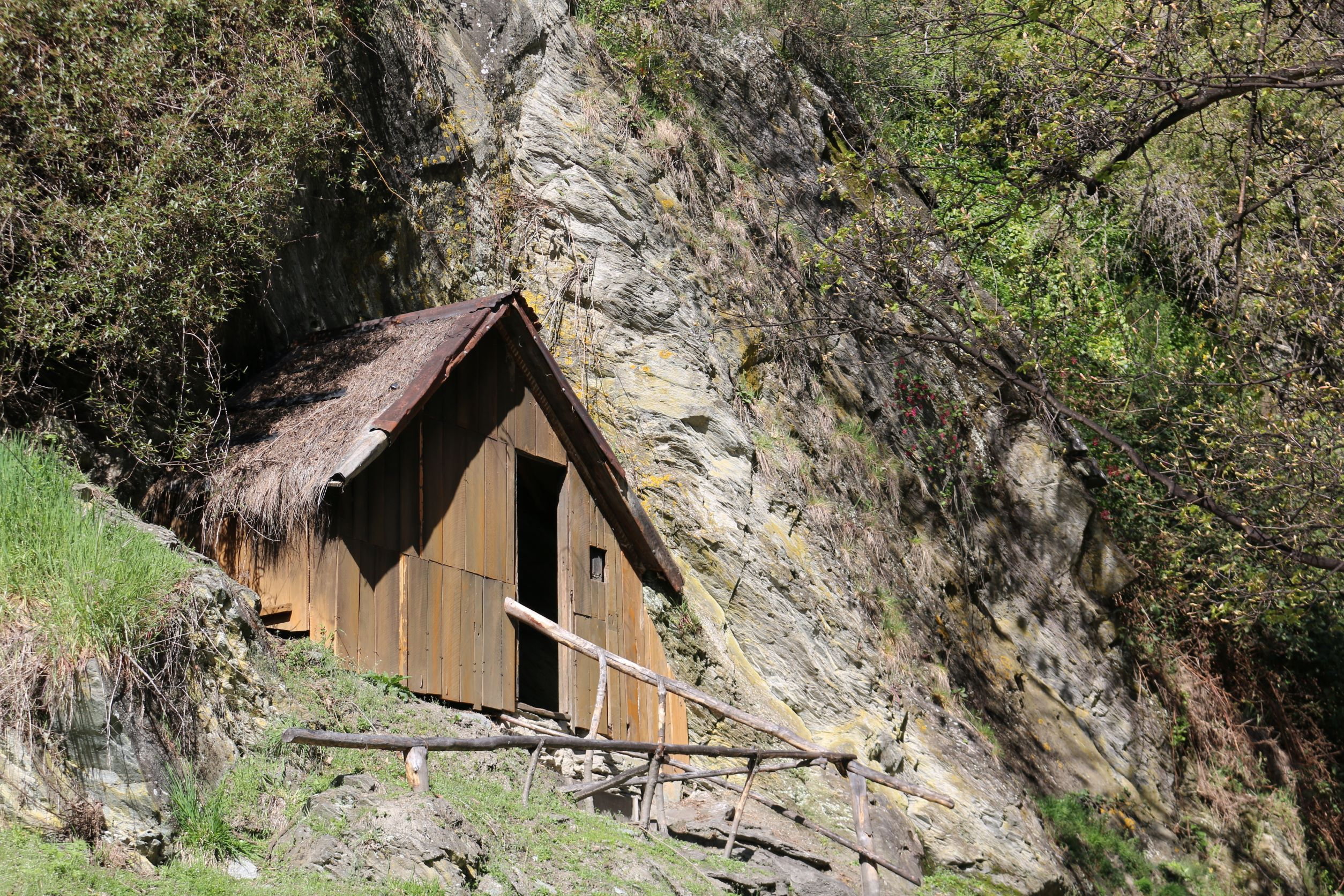
Arrowtown Chinese goldminers huts (October 2021)

Arrowtown is the home of the historic Chinese Settlement which includes Ah Lum's store. This is located by Bush Creek and highlights the contribution of Chinese goldminers to the region. There are a number of restored miner's houses that can be visited.

== Education ==
The first school opened in Arrowtown in 1863. The original school building was a wooden single room building. In 1875 a new school building made of stone was constructed. By 1906 there were a total of six schools in the Arrowtown area including a high school. In 1997 the present school site on Centennial Avenue was opened. The school roll numbered 187 pupils then.

Arrowtown School is the only remaining school in the town. It is a co-educational state primary school for Year 1 to 8 students, with a roll of 433 as of July 2026.

== Lakes District Museum ==
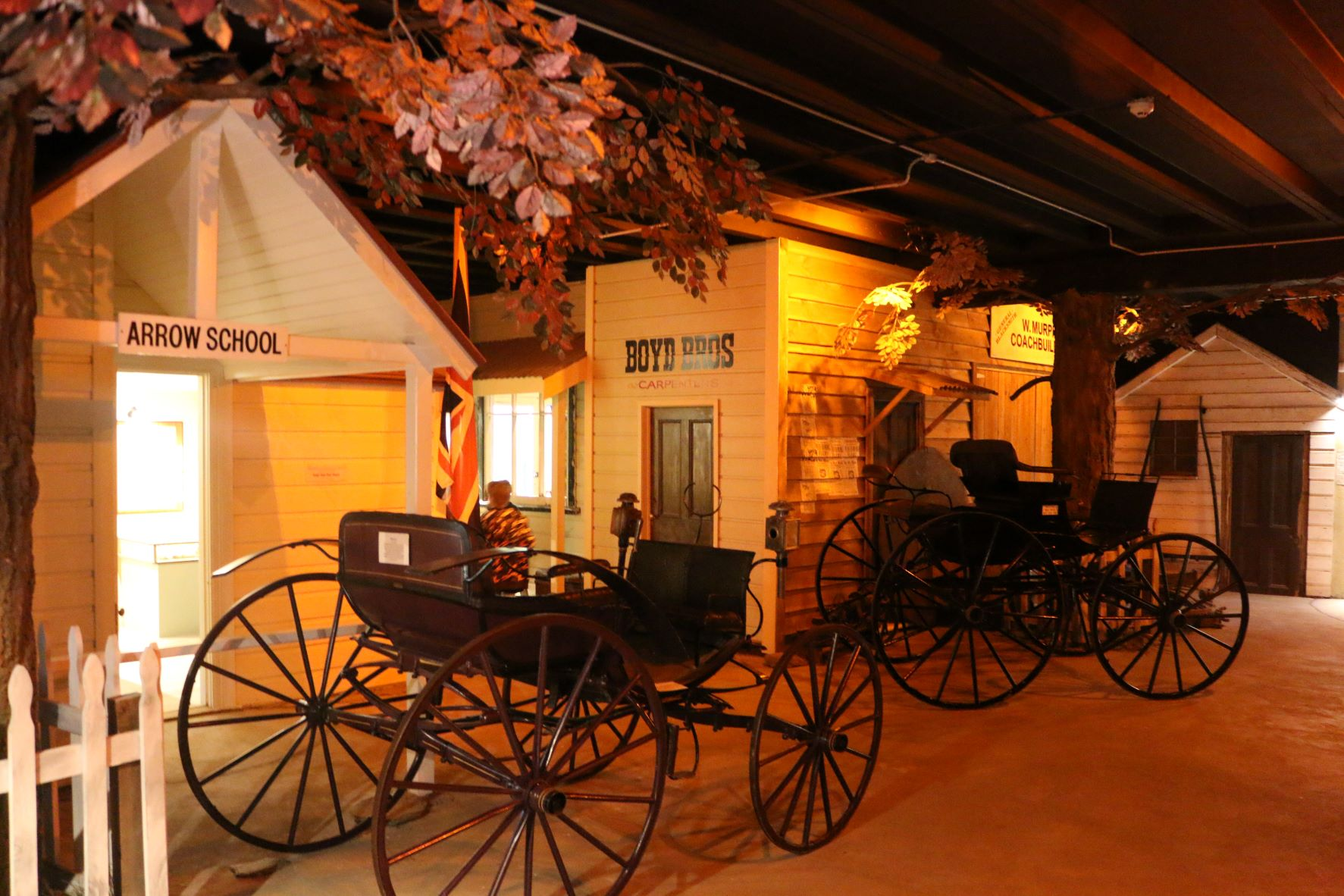
Lakes District Museum, Arrowtown (October 2021)

The Lakes District Museum is located in a collection of historic buildings in Arrowtown. It details the history of the local area, in particular, gold mining and the early settlers. Work in 2020 and 2021 has started on earthquake strengthening the museum buildings and restoring the former Bank of New Zealand building to its original look. Queen Elizabeth, the Queen Mother visited the Lakes District museum in 1966. Queen Elizabeth II also visited the Lakes District museum in 1990.

== Government ==
The Borough of Arrowtown was proclaimed on 14 January 1874 and Samuel Goldston was soon elected as the first mayor of the borough.

Arrowtown became part of the Queenstown-Lakes District in the local government reorganisation of 1989. Arrowtown is part of the Southland electorate.

== Sport and leisure ==
=== Swimming pool ===
The Arrowtown Memorial Pool is run by the Queenstown-Lakes District Council. The outdoor pool is open from the end of November until the start of March each summer. The main heated pool is 29 metres long and has five lanes. There is also a smaller heated toddler pool.

=== Mountain biking ===
There are a number of mountain bike trails around Arrowtown. The most developed is the 110 kilometre Queenstown Trail. The Lake Hayes 16 kilometre loop is a popular ride also. The Arrow river bridges trail finishes in Gibbston and follows the Arrow river.

== Notable buildings ==
=== Arrowtown Masonic Lodge ===
The Lodge Arrow Kilwinning No 86 on Berkshire Street was completed in 1888. A six year project to restore the building was completed in 2010. It is a category one historic place.

=== Buckingham street historic area ===
The seven houses located along Buckingham Street have mostly unaltered exteriors and were constructed in the 1870s. These surviving examples of cottages that gold miners of the time lived in are listed with Heritage New Zealand. The one bedroom property at 53 Buckingham Street was built in 1890 and was originally used as a chemist shop and then as a tailor's shop until 1905. It was sold for 350 pounds in the early 1950s. It was most recently sold in 2021 for $1.85 million dollars.

=== St John's Church (Presbyterian) ===
Located on Berkshire Street, St John's Church was built in 1873 of schist. The first stone building in Arrowtown, it was designed by architect Frederick Burwell in a Gothic Revival style. It was designated by Heritage New Zealand as a Category II Historic Place in 2012.

=== Saint Patrick's Catholic church ===
Saint Patrick's, located on Hertford Street, was built between 1873 and 1902 and is a category two historic place. The church was another design by architect Frederick Burwell. It has a gothic design and is built out of local schist rock with a Star of David rose window.

=== Saint Paul's Anglican church ===
Saint Paul's, is the oldest church in Arrowtown, having been built in 1871. Built out of wood in a simplified gothic revival style, the church was built at a cost of 350 pounds. The church is a category one historic place.

=== Arrowtown library ===
The Arrowtown library was built in the 1980s and is on Buckingham Street. Designed by architect Michael Wyatt, the building blends in with the town's 19th century buildings.

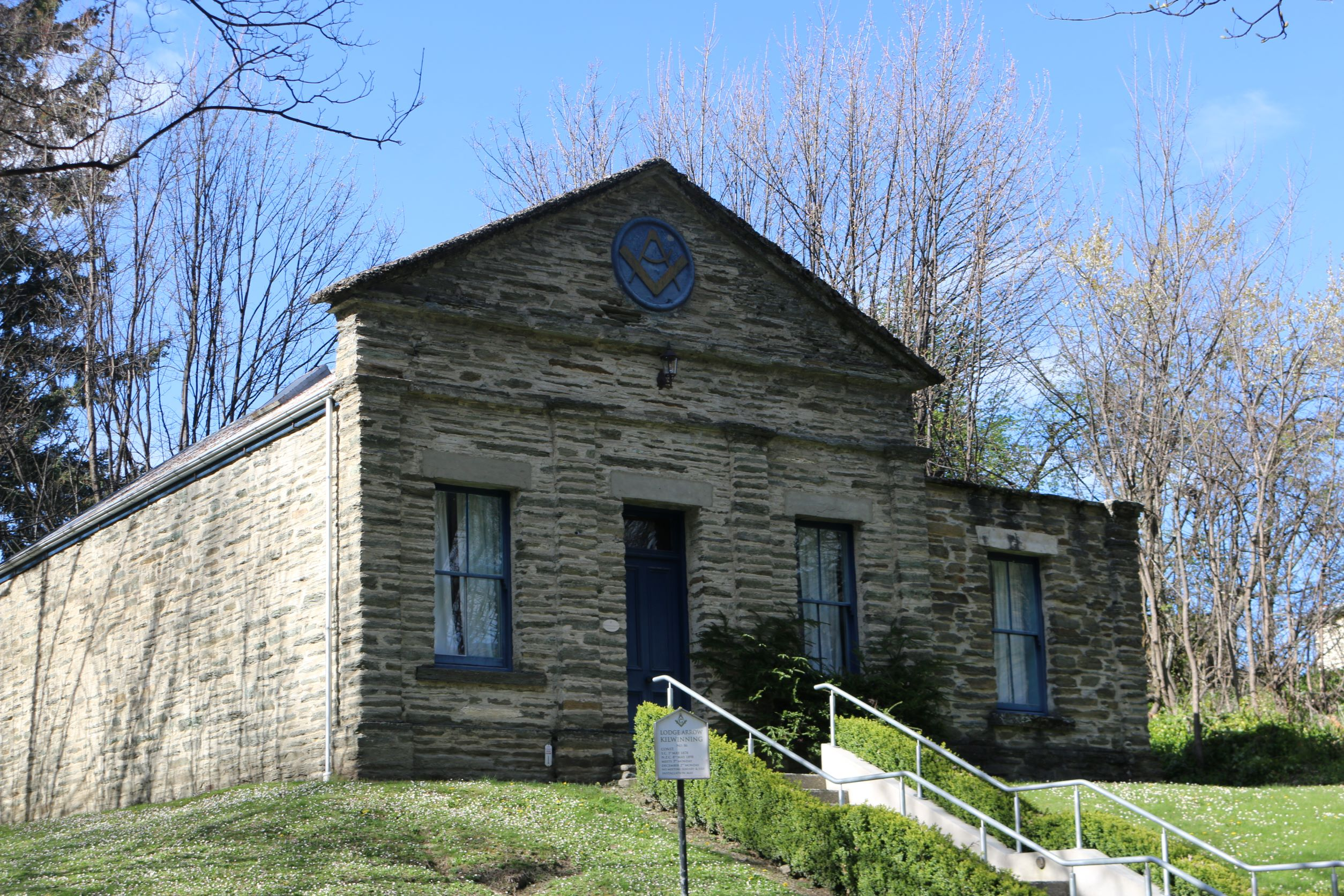
Arrowtown Masonic lodge (October 2021)

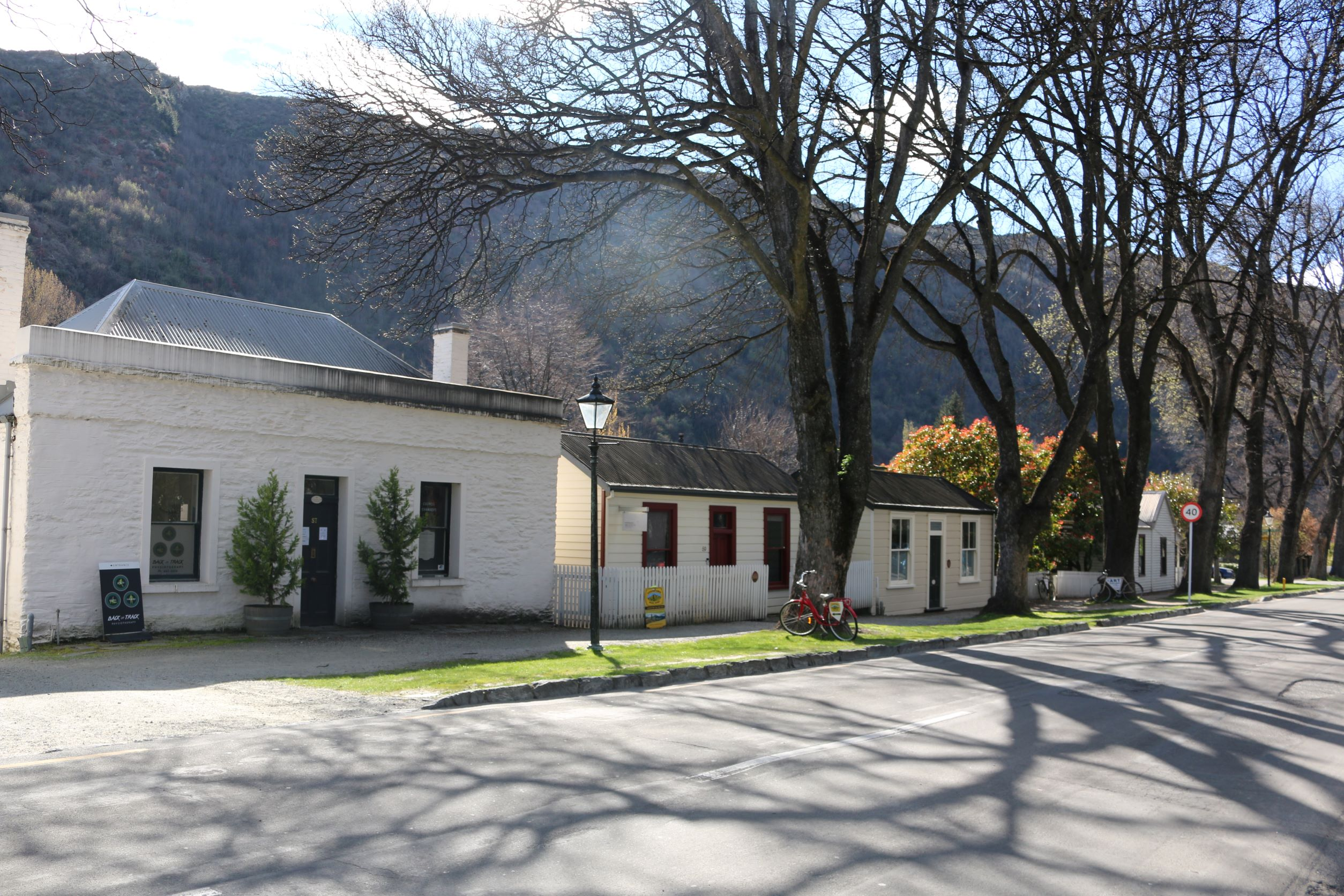
Buckingham street historic area (October 2021)

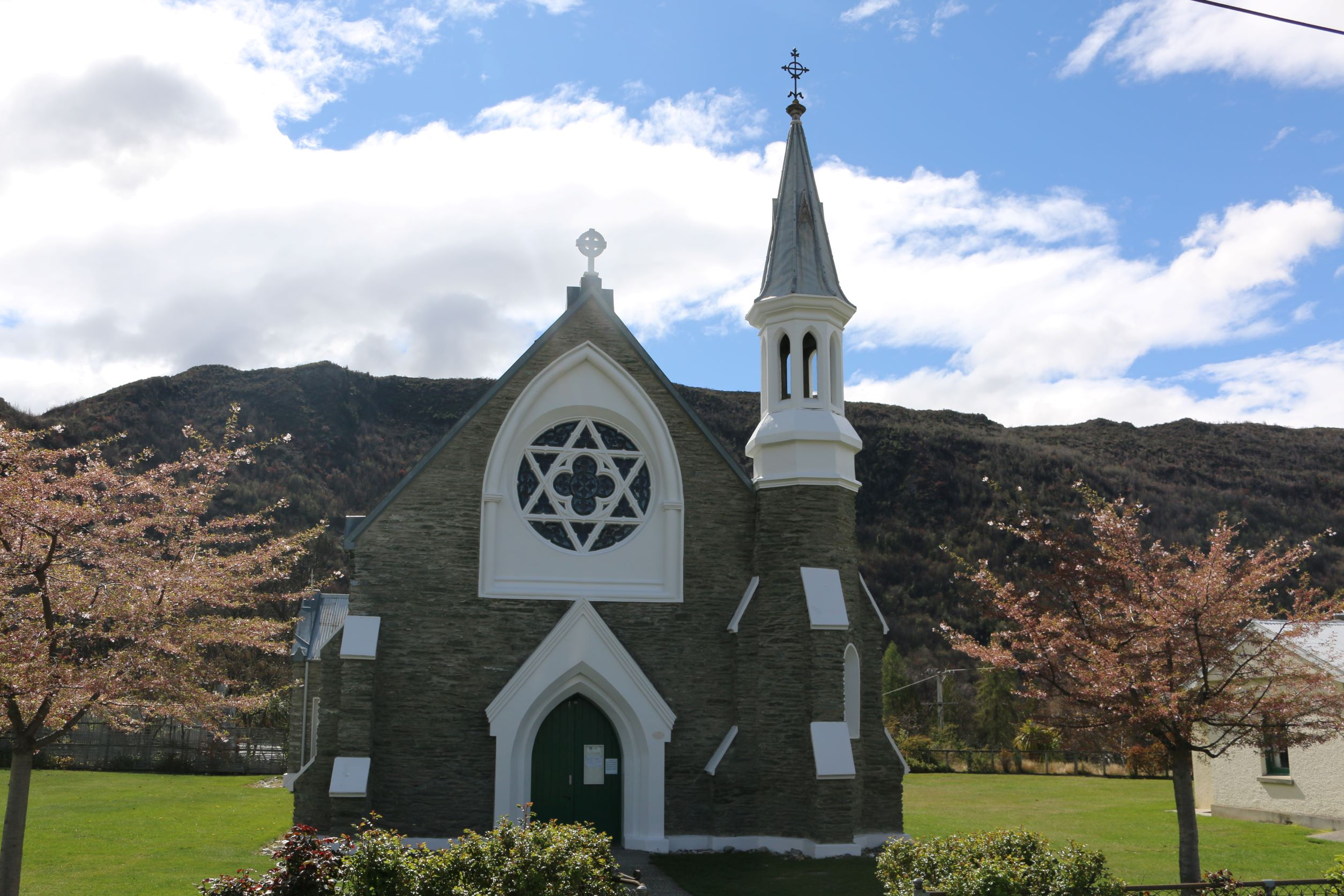
St Patrick's Catholic church (October 2021)

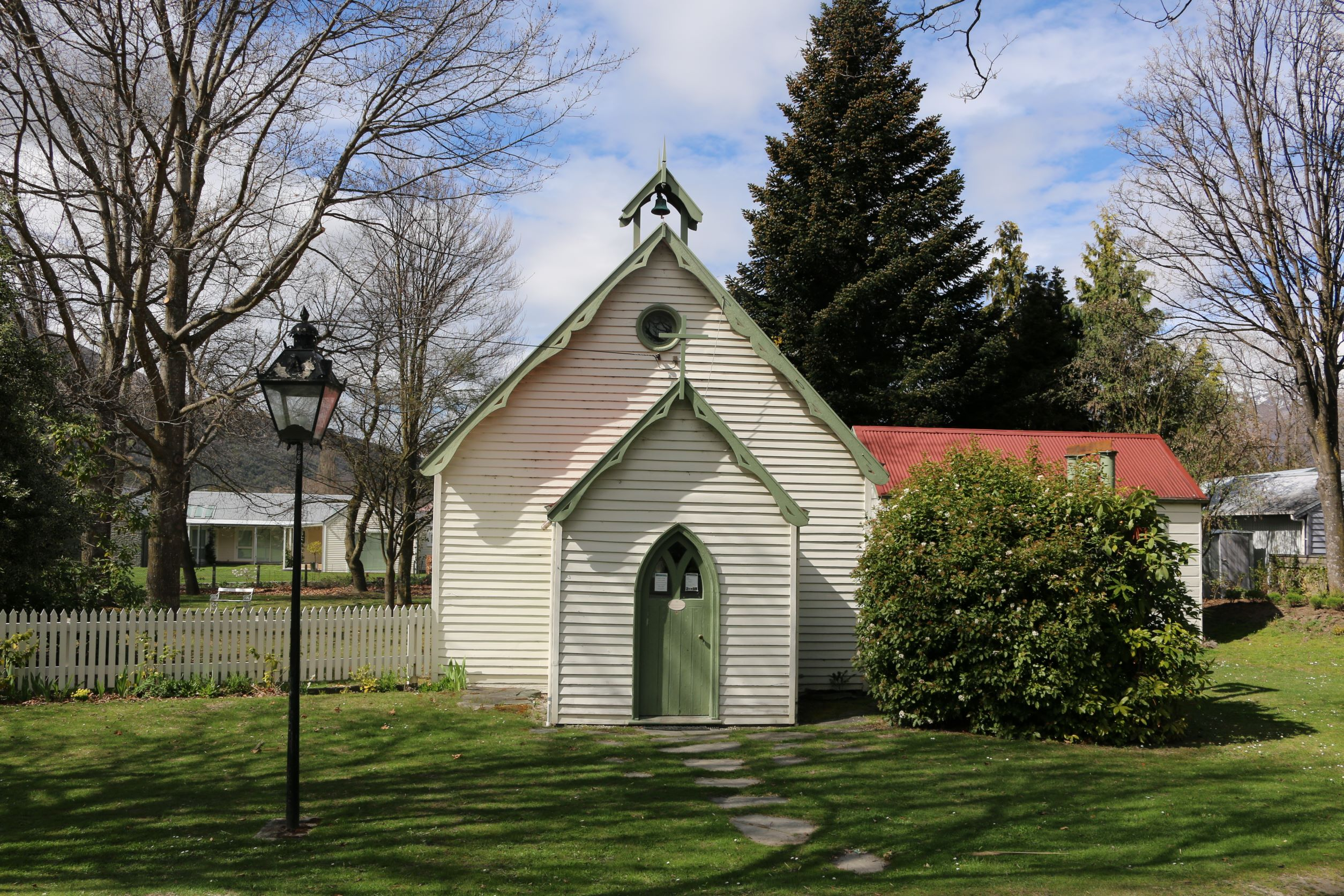
St Paul's Anglican church (October 2021)

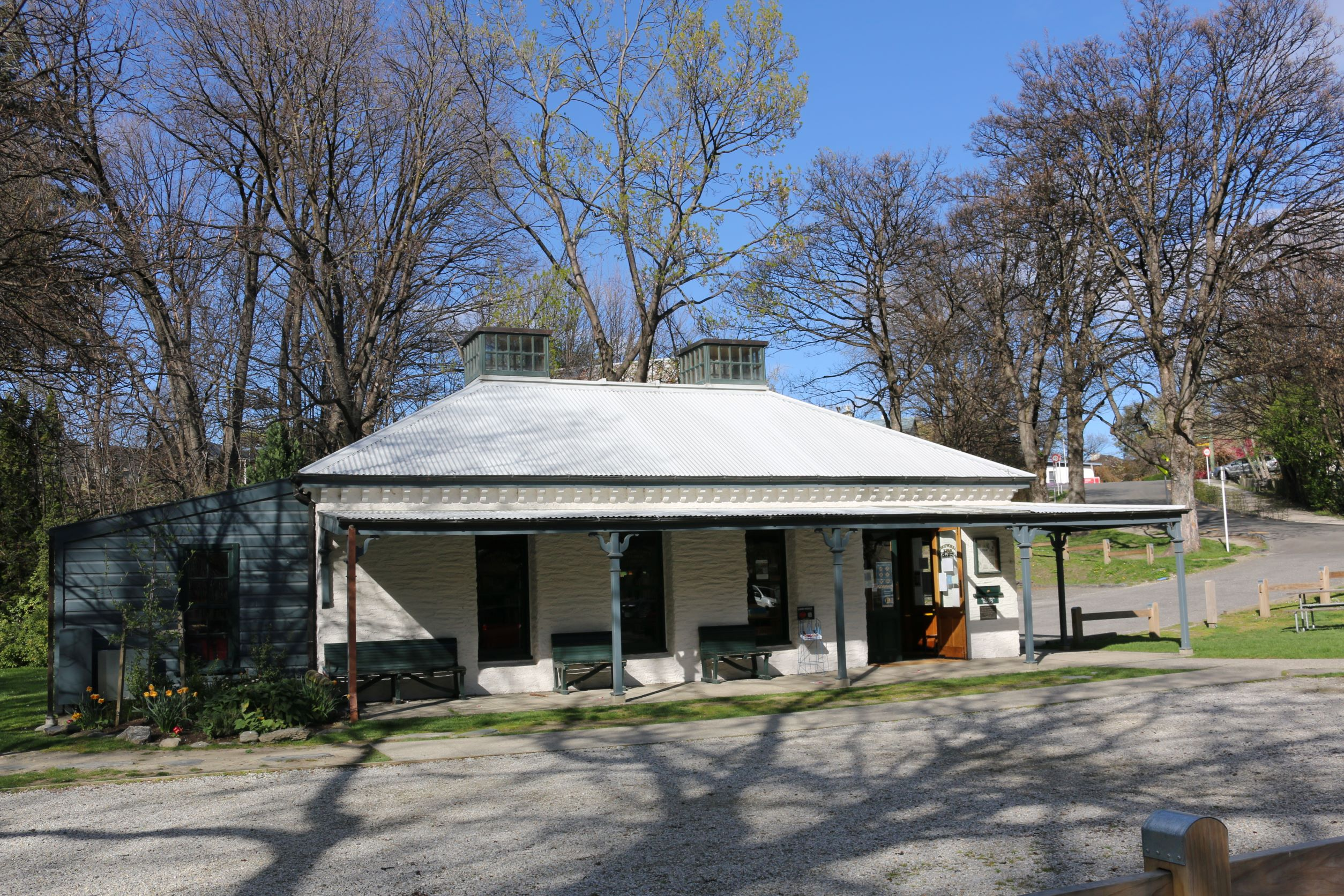
Arrowtown Library (October 2021)

== Festivals ==
=== Arrowtown autumn festival ===
Arrowtown holds its annual autumn festival in April each year. The 2024 festival will be the 39th edition. Festival attractions include the street parade, The Arrow Miners Band would play on an Old Red Truck and the Buckingham Belles Can-Can at the lunchtime entertainment. There is also gold panning championships, There will be also multiple musicians and performers, street entertainment, vintage car display and plenty of market stalls selling New Zealand made products.

=== Matariki Arrowtown ===
Matariki Arrowtown Lights is a one day cultural event that happens on Matariki in central Arrowtown. There is a showcase of visual storytelling and light displayed projections down Buckingham Street. The show will start with a mihi (welcome) followed by a karakia and songs by Waiata group, followed by performances by a Kapa haka from students from Wakatipu High School. Later in the evening a astrophysicist will share the wonders of the Otago night skies, There will also be food stalls and fire pits to be able to gather and share stories.

== Air pollution ==
In 2015, it was reported that Arrowtown had had one of its worst air pollution readings on record reaching a level of 168 mcg per cubic metre of PM10 particulates. The last time this level had been reached was 2007. Arrowtown, along with Alexandra recorded the highest levels of air pollution in Otago. A combination of domestic wood burning heaters and the geography of the Arrowtown region causing temperature inversions was thought to be the problem. The issue was still present in 2019 with Arrowtown being labelled as having some of the worst air pollution in Australasia.

NIWA deployed initially 22 sensors (which increased to a total of 48 sensors) in Arrowtown in 2019 to investigate the issue. They found that the air quality in the early afternoon was excellent at all locations. Poor air quality was linked to cold winter nights with a smaller impact on the following mornings. Air quality was better in the north-west of the town and worst in the south east of the town. The air quality was consistent with the usage of where in the town that domestic wood burning heaters were being used. The Otago Regional Council has been working with homeowners to replace their domestic wood burning heaters with cleaner heating devices such as heat pumps and improving insulation in homes.

Arrowtown had 23 high pollution nights, where PM10 particulate levels exceeded the national environmental standards in winter 2021. This decreased in winter 2022 to a total of 10 nights.

== Notable people ==
- Ebenezer Sandford (1848–1897), politician
- Philip De La Perrelle (1872-1935), politician
- Nora FitzGibbon (1889-1979), nurse
- Michael Hill (1938-2025), entrepreneur
