= Bullendale =

Abandoned mining settlement in Otago, New Zealand

Coordinates: 44.787754°S 168.673869°E

Bullendale is an abandoned mining settlement in Otago, New Zealand. It is the site of New Zealand's first industrial hydro-electric power plant. Located in rugged and remote countryside, it has survived to become of historical significance, and several archaeological surveys have been conducted there.

== Phoenix Mine, Battery and Power Plant ==
The 20 stamp battery was originally powered mechanically by a water turbine fed from a miners water race. However the lack of water during dry weather prompted the call for power to be provided from an electric generating plant using water from the nearby Skippers Creek, a tributary of the Shotover River. The battery was upgraded to 30 stamps in anticipation of the increased power supplied by the electric system.

Electricity generation began in 1886 with two dynamos, giving a maximum combined capacity of 50 kilowatts (67 hp). There was a two mile long transmission line from the generating station to the stamping battery. However, this early system proved to have many problems, and the mines inspector is quoted as saying "very little is yet really known about electricity". At first, the dynamos were incapable of powering the full 30 stamps and the water turbine was still needed to run the battery at full capacity. The dynamos were upgraded the following year, replacing the cast-iron armatures with laminated iron ones, and by 1888 the electric plant was capable of powering the 30 stamps as well as an air compressor and a stone breaker.

In 1896 a new water race was built, enabling the water to be used directly for power once again. The electric system continued to be used as auxiliary until about 1901 when the dynamos were used for the last time.

A historic hut on the site is believed to have been the hydro-electric station manager's accommodation. It is now known as Dynamo Hut and is owned by the Department of Conservation.
