= Frederick Burwell =

Scottish-born architect active in New Zealand and Australia (1846–1915)

- Born: 20 May 1846; Huntly, Aberdeenshire, Scotland
- Died: 25 October 1915 (aged 69); Melbourne, Victoria, Australia
- Occupation: Architect
- Buildings: St John's Church, Arrowtown (1872); St Patrick's Catholic Church, Arrowtown (1873); Victoria Pavilion, Fremantle (1897); Fowler's Warehouse, Fremantle (1900); Central Chambers, Fremantle (1907)

Frederick William Burwell (20 May 1846 – 25 October 1915) was a Scottish-born architect, who was active in New Zealand and Australia from the 1870s to 1900s. He was the designer of a number of notable buildings in Invercargill, in the South Island of New Zealand, and Fremantle, in Western Australia.

== Early life ==
Frederick William Burwell was born on 20 May 1846 in Huntly, Aberdeenshire in Scotland, the son of a merchant and his wife. His mother was widowed when Burwell was young and they lived with his maternal grandparents. His uncle, David Ross, was an architect and may have influenced Burwell's taking up of that profession. He was apprenticed to a Scottish architect, James Matthews.

== Professional practice ==
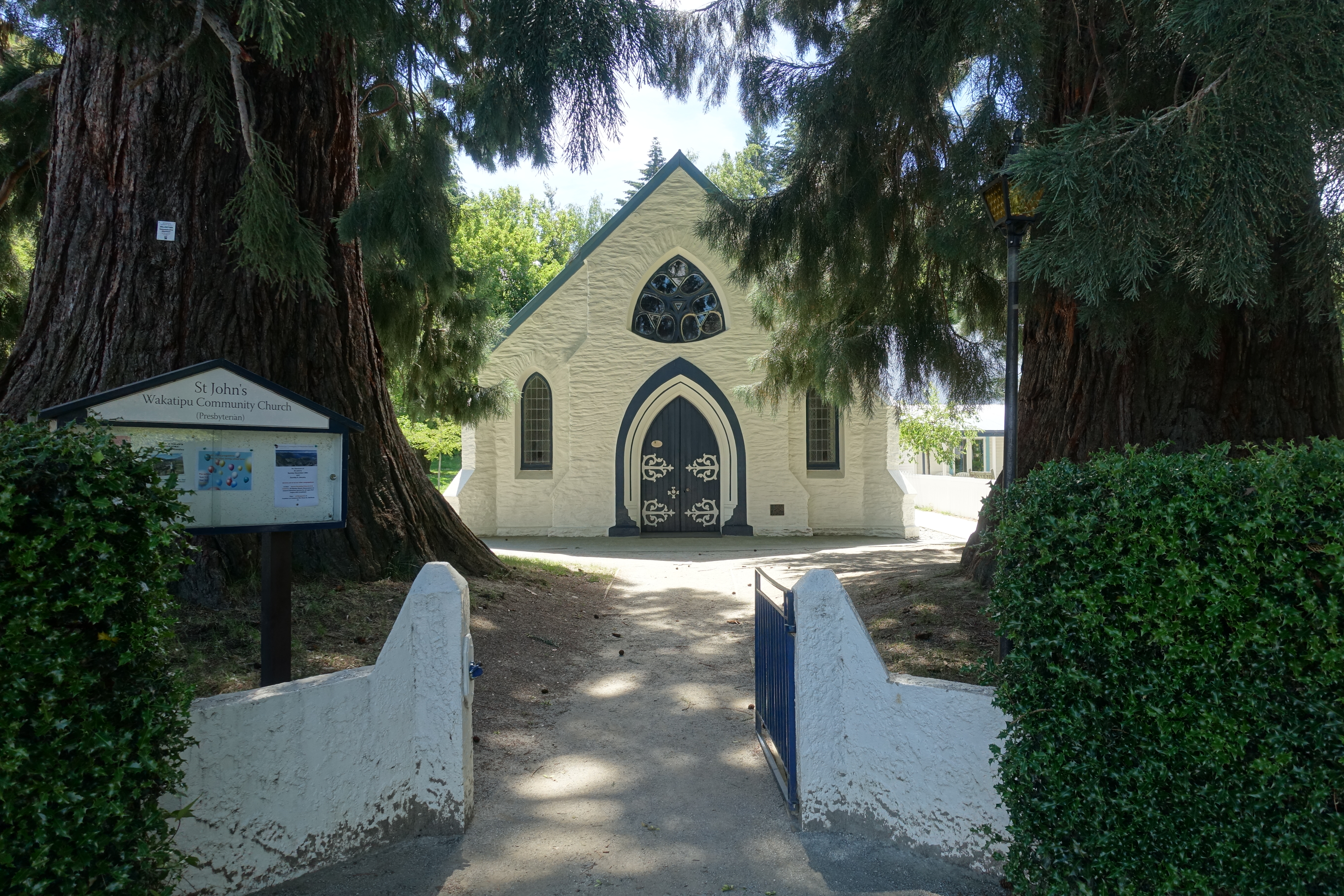
Burwell's St John's Church, in Arrowtown

Burwell commenced practice as an architect in Queenstown in New Zealand in July 1871, having spent the previous two years in Melbourne, Australia. While in Queenstown, he also served in the Volunteer Force, New Zealand's colonial militia. An early ecclesiastical commission for Burwell was the Presbyterian St John's Church in Arrowtown. Designed in about 1872, it used schist and was executed in a Gothic style. The church was listed in 2012 as a heritage building by Heritage New Zealand. Another heritage listed religious building of Burwell's, also in Arrowtown, was St Patrick's Catholic Church, which was built of stone in 1873 and briefly used by Mary MacKillop.

=== Invercargill ===
In 1874, Burwell moved to south to Invercargill, in Southland. Much of his subsequent work greatly influenced the development of the city's business precinct which, at the time, was largely composed of basic wooden structures. Burwell designed and oversaw the construction of several two- and three-storied stone and brick commercial buildings. Among his works was a warehouse for Thomson and Beattie Drapers, built in 1881, the city's premises for the Bank of New Zealand, built in the period 1877 to 1879, and a building for Briscoe and Company, built in 1881 to 1882. All are heritage listed structures.

Burwell's work at this time was not limited to commercial buildings; he may have been the architect for 'Lennel', a grand residence built on Albert Street in Invercargill in 1880 for John Turnbull Thomson, the former Surveyor-General of New Zealand. He also designed the city's St Paul's Church. He took commissions elsewhere in Otago and Southland; his Holy Trinity Church, in Winton, was built of timber in 1876 and is a heritage listed building.

During his time in Invercargill Burwell was admitted as a Fellow of the Royal Institute of British Architects. By 1886, New Zealand was in the grip of a depression which impacted Burwell's work. That year he toured Europe and the United States for several months but the local situation had not improved by his return at the end of the year, so the following year he moved to Melbourne. There he took a number of residential commissions although opportunities were still limited and in 1894 he relocated to Western Australia. His uncle David Ross was based in Perth at this time, and the two set up an architectural practice there. This lasted for three years, and in 1897 he started a solo practice in Fremantle.

=== Fremantle ===
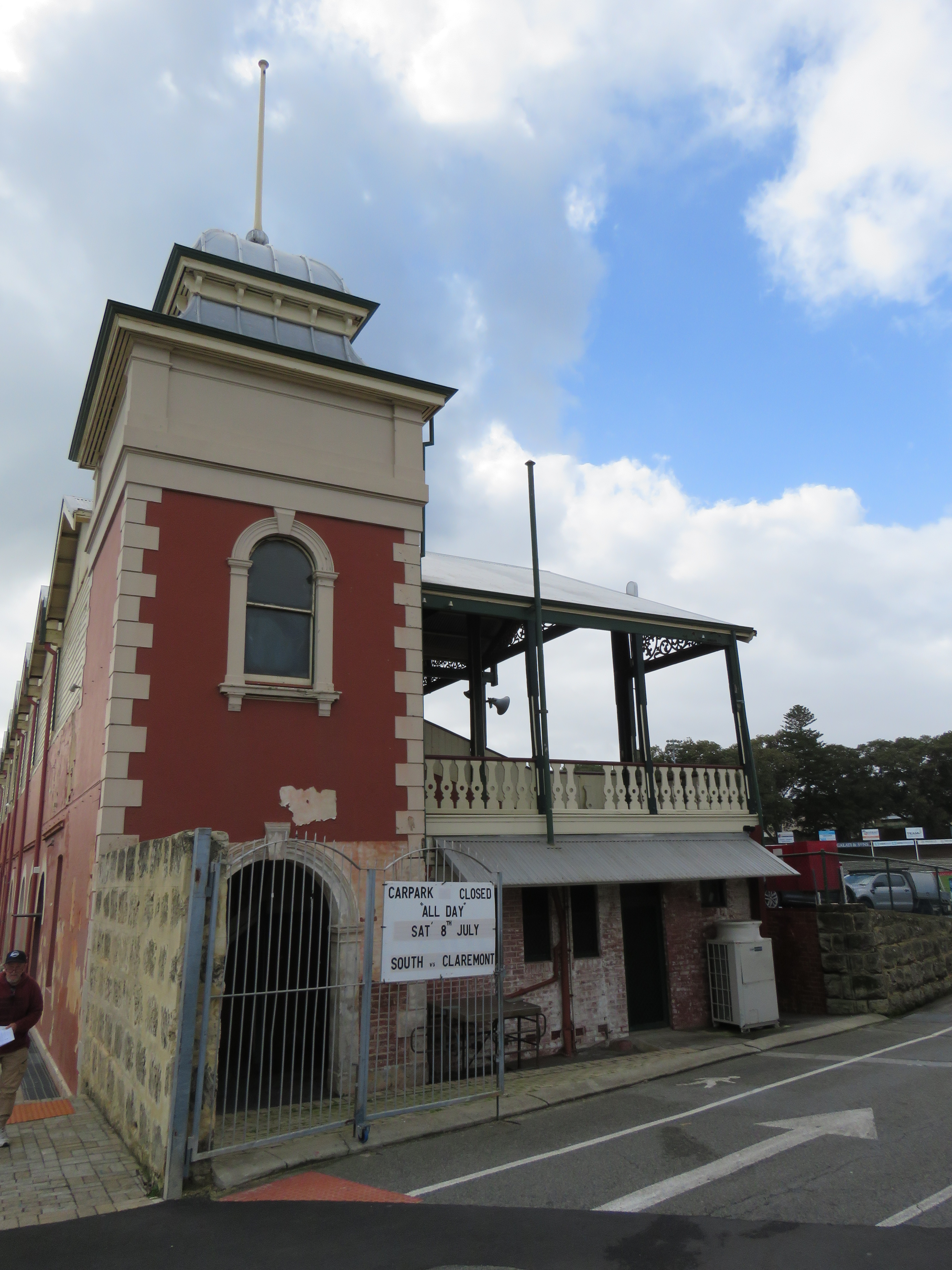
Victoria Pavilion at Fremantle Oval was designed by Burwell for a design competition in 1897

Over the next several years, Burwell designed a number of well known buildings, many in the Federation Free Classical style, in Fremantle. These included Fowler's Warehouse on Henry Street, heritage listed by the Heritage Council of Western Australia and the largest architecturally designed warehouse in Fremantle with a distinctive visual style, the 1897 Victoria Pavilion at Fremantle Oval, which was selected from 13 competing designs, and the city's Central Chambers, located on the corner of High and Pakenham Streets. As a practicing Freemason, he was commissioned to design the Freemason's Hotel, which became known as the Sail and Anchor Hotel. It was not his first Freemason-related commission; among his earlier work in Invercargill was the design of the city's Masonic Hall, completed in 1882 and heritage listed.

== Later life ==
In 1908, Burwell retired, having been responsible for designed over 350 buildings during the course of his professional career. He and his wife Ann, who he had married in 1891, settled in the Armadale suburb of Melbourne. He died there on 25 October 1915.
