= Macetown =

Uninhabited locality in New Zealand

Coordinates: 44°52′S 168°50′E

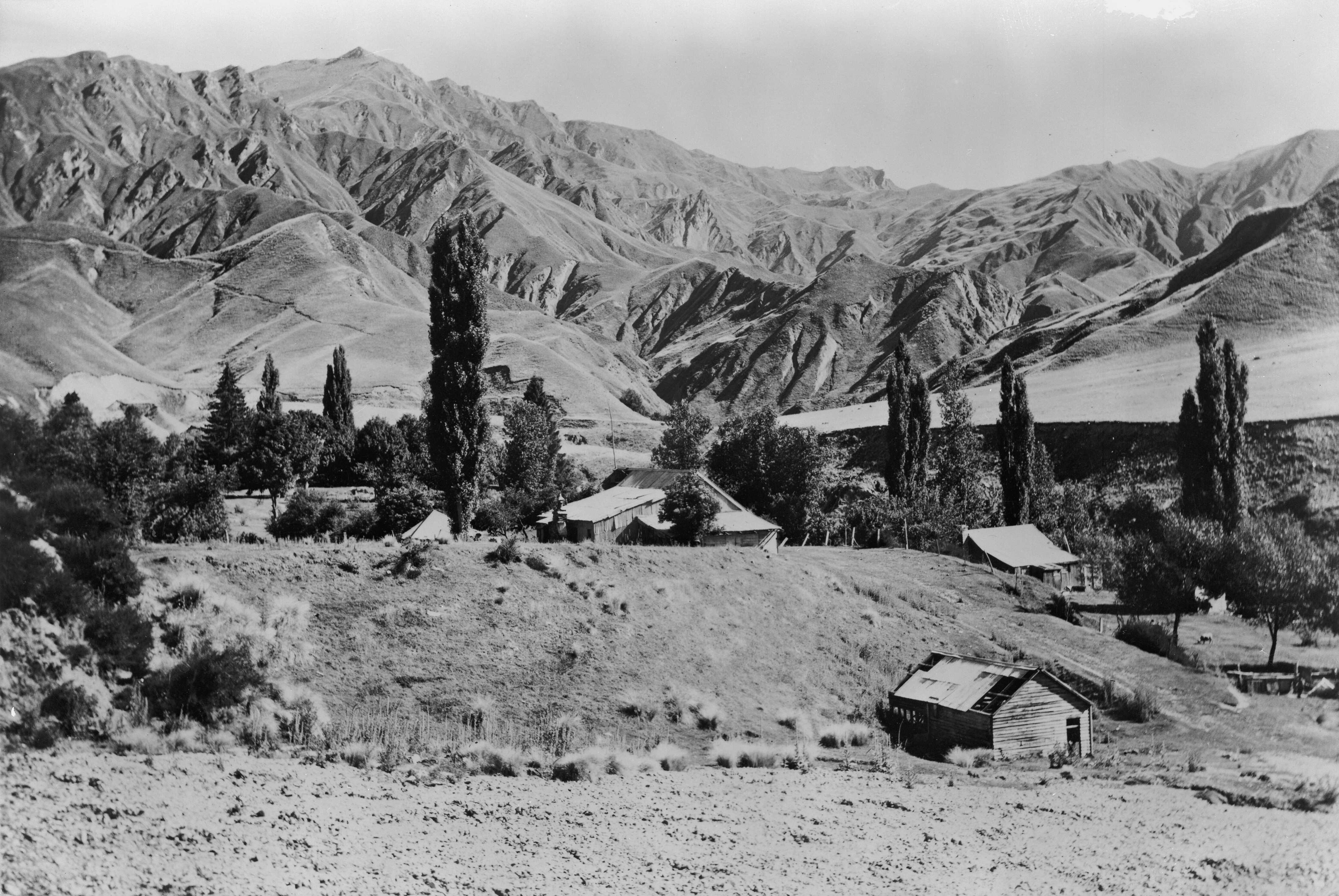
Macetown in the early 1920s

Macetown is an historic gold mining settlement in the Otago region of the South Island of New Zealand. It is now uninhabited but has become a tourist attraction.

== History ==
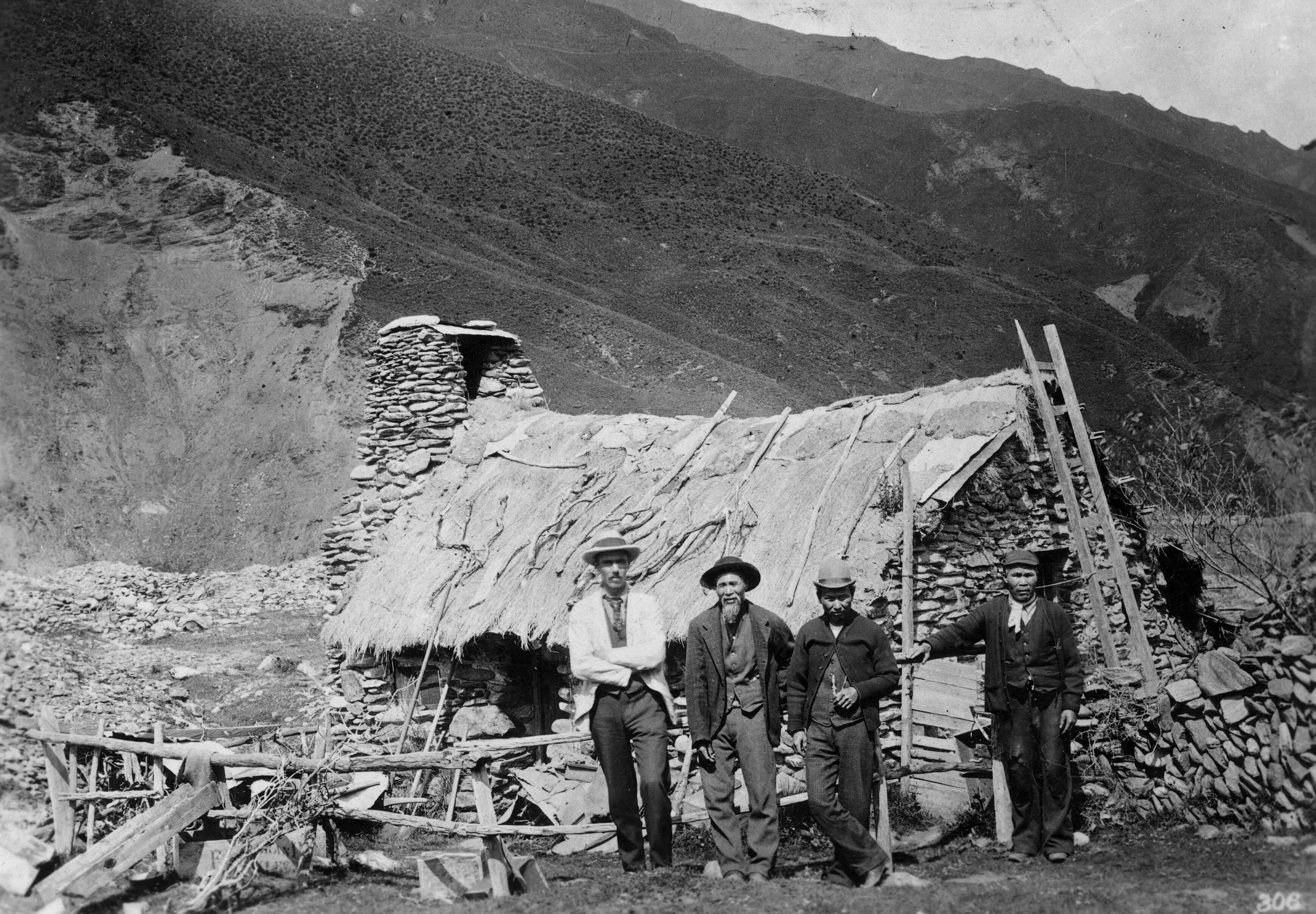
Chinese miners and George Neur in Macetown

During the Otago gold rush Tom Hall came across a group of Chinese prospectors at the Tipperary reef. Hall recognised the potential of the reef and pegged it. A settlement soon formed near the reef known as Twelve Mile, after the distance of the settlement from Arrowtown. The settlement eventually came to be known as Macetown after John and Henry Mace.

The difficulty in transporting materials between Macetown and Arrowtown prevented significant lode mining from occurring and prevented the settlement from growing to the scale of the other mining settlements. Multiple fatalities occurred along the road to Arrowtown. During strong winters the populace could be snowbound for weeks.

In 1868 the settlers agreed to build an interdenominational Protestant church. A public school was established by the education board in 1870, the school had a role of 21 and maintained a similar number throughout the 19th century. In 1916 the school closed with only 3 children enrolled at the time.

At the height of the settlement Macetown had a population of c.500. From 1886 to 1906 the reefs began to close down and the population declined. The last resident of Macetown was William Jenkins, who referred to himself as mayor of Macetown.

Needham's House (or the Schoolmaster's House), Macetown

The bakehouse, Macetown

== Residents ==
Joseph Needham was a gold miner and the Macetown schoolmaster from 1879 to 1889. He married a widow, Mrs Heads, who had one daughter, Mary, and a son, John Thomas. Mr and Mrs Needham had a daughter, Nellie, and their son was named Locksley. Mary Heads married Mr Thomas McSoriley and they were for many years the proprietors of the nine-bedroom Beach House (later O'Connell's Hotel) in Queenstown. One of their sons, Pat, became the captain of the TSS Earnslaw on Lake Wakatipu.

William Tily Smith ran a store in Macetown for over fifty years. He also did the twice-weekly mail run to Arrowtown and built the bakehouse.

Oliver Palmer was a member of the 'Twelve Apostles', a group of miners who spent all their money on gambling and alcohol. They would gather at the Montezuma Hut and referred to each other by a variety of lofty titles such as 'The King', 'The Doctor' or 'The Saint'.

Many Macetown residents migrated to Arrowtown in the early 1900s to work in Queenstown. These included the Anderson family, who ran the Alpine hotel in Macetown, and the Tallentire family. The youngest son, Thomas Tallentire, later became the editor of the Queenstown Daily Mail in the early 1930s.

William Jenkins frequently rode wildly through the streets of Macetown. By 1921 he was the only remaining resident and promptly declared himself Mayor. His mother had run the Alpine Hotel.

Macetown had a small Chinese community which was based near the end of the main street in an area known as "Chinatown". The Chinese miners annually celebrated Chinese New Year with a feast and a display of fireworks to the delight of all.
