= Owston's Buildings =

Heritage buildings in Fremantle, Western Australia

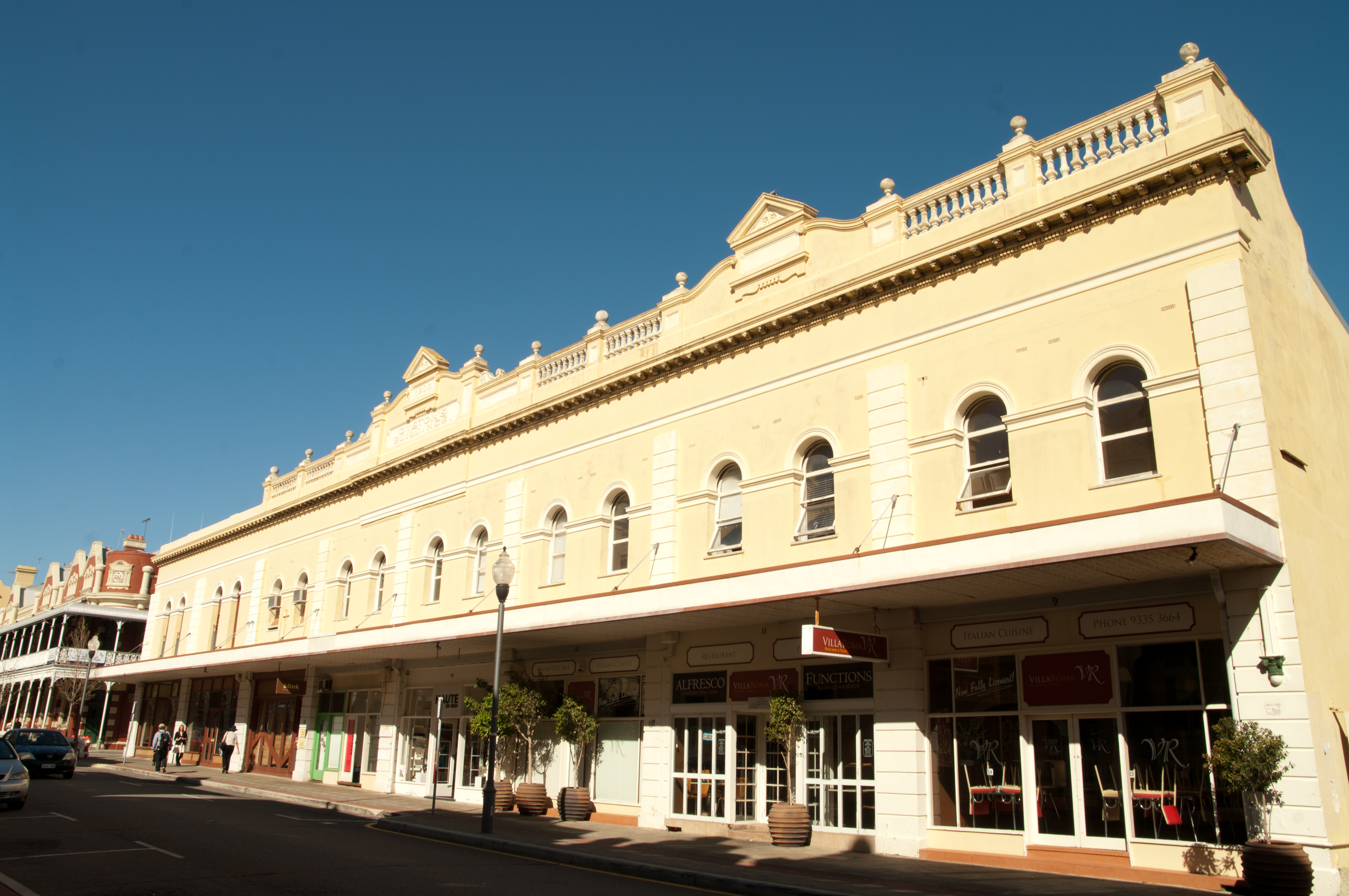
- Owston's Buildings 2012
- Interactive map of the Owston's Buildings area

General information
- Location: 32.05570°S 115.7430°E, 9–23 High Street, Fremantle, Western Australia
- Construction started: 1903
- Completed: 1903
- Client: William Owston

Technical details
- Floor count: 2

Design and construction
- Architecture firm: F.W.Buwell
- Main contractor: R.Rennie

Western Australia Heritage Register
- Type: State Registered Place
- Part of: West End, Fremantle (25225)
- Reference no.: 909

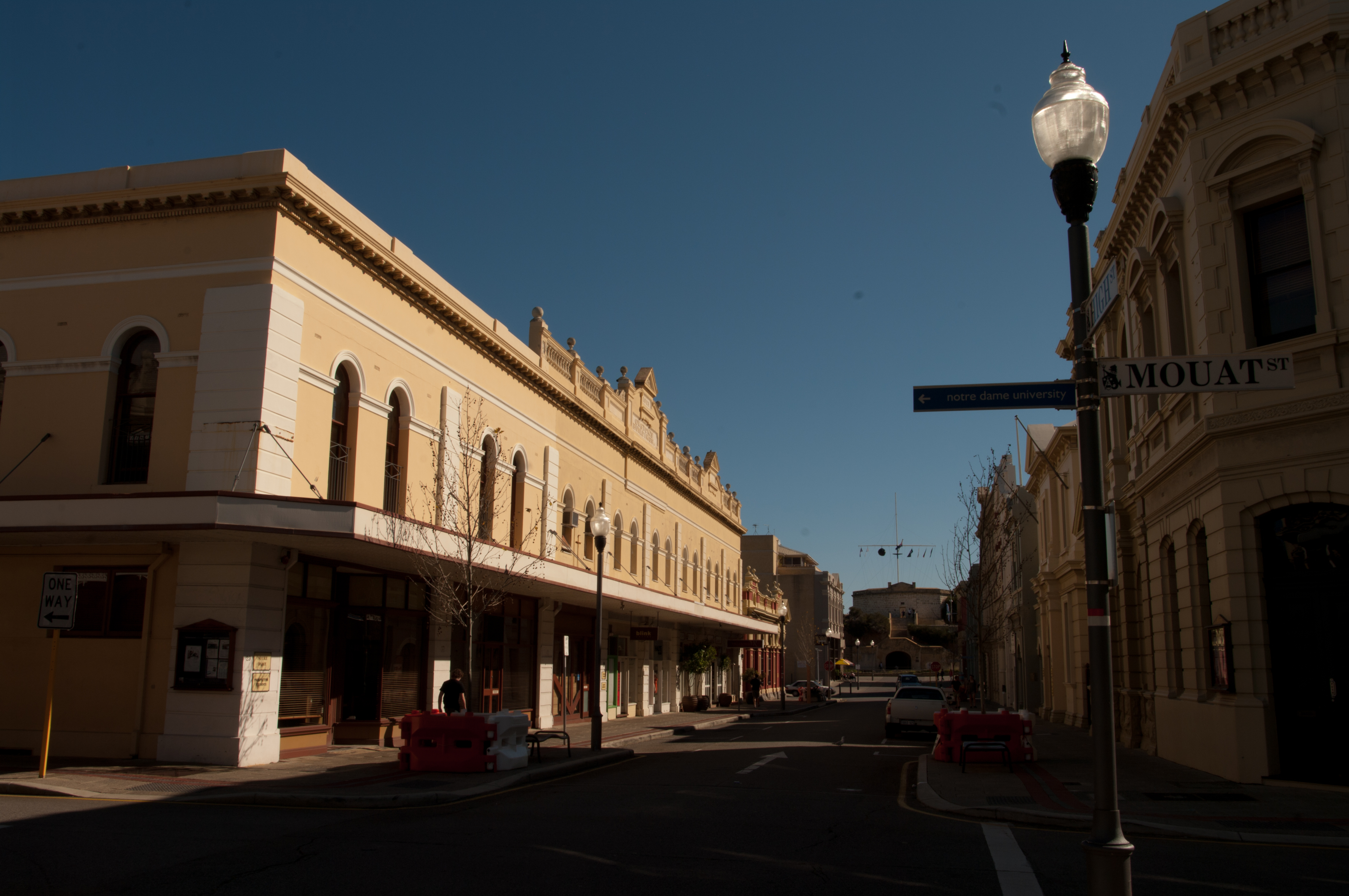
Owston's Buildings from Mouat Street corner.

Owston's Buildings, also known as Ouston's building, is a heritage listed building located at 9–23 High Street on the corner with Mouat Street in the Fremantle West End Heritage area. It was one of many buildings constructed in Fremantle during the gold boom period in the late nineteenth and early twentieth century.

Built on the site of the old Sandover building, the building was designed by the architect Frederick William Burwell and was built by Richard Rennie. The building was completed in 1903 and comprised eight shops on the ground floor and six flats on the first floor; a two storey verandah originally existed on two sides.

The building is made from rendered brick and has zero setback from the footpath. The building is separated into eight sections by pilasters on the façade giving an ashlar effect. There is a roof parapet over the moulded cornice with low balastruding and two pediments. The centre pediment has "Owston's Buildings" and "1903" featured in the stucco. The first floor has arched windows with stucco architraves.

Burwell's plans were completed in February 1903 and tenders were called for during that month asking for the erection of a building with eight shops, warehouses, and residences. It was named for William Owston, who commissioned the construction of the building. Owston was ship's captain and a trader who had arrived in Fremantle in 1849. The property was valued at £10,000 when Owston died in 1903.

The Western Australian Bank had a branch office in the building in 1903 when its own building was being refitted across the street.

The Roma or Villa Roma restaurant was established in the building during the 1940s and remained there until 2005. The University of Notre Dame currently have offices in the building with the remainder leased by various small businesses.

== See also ==
- List of heritage places in Fremantle
