= Arrow River (New Zealand) =

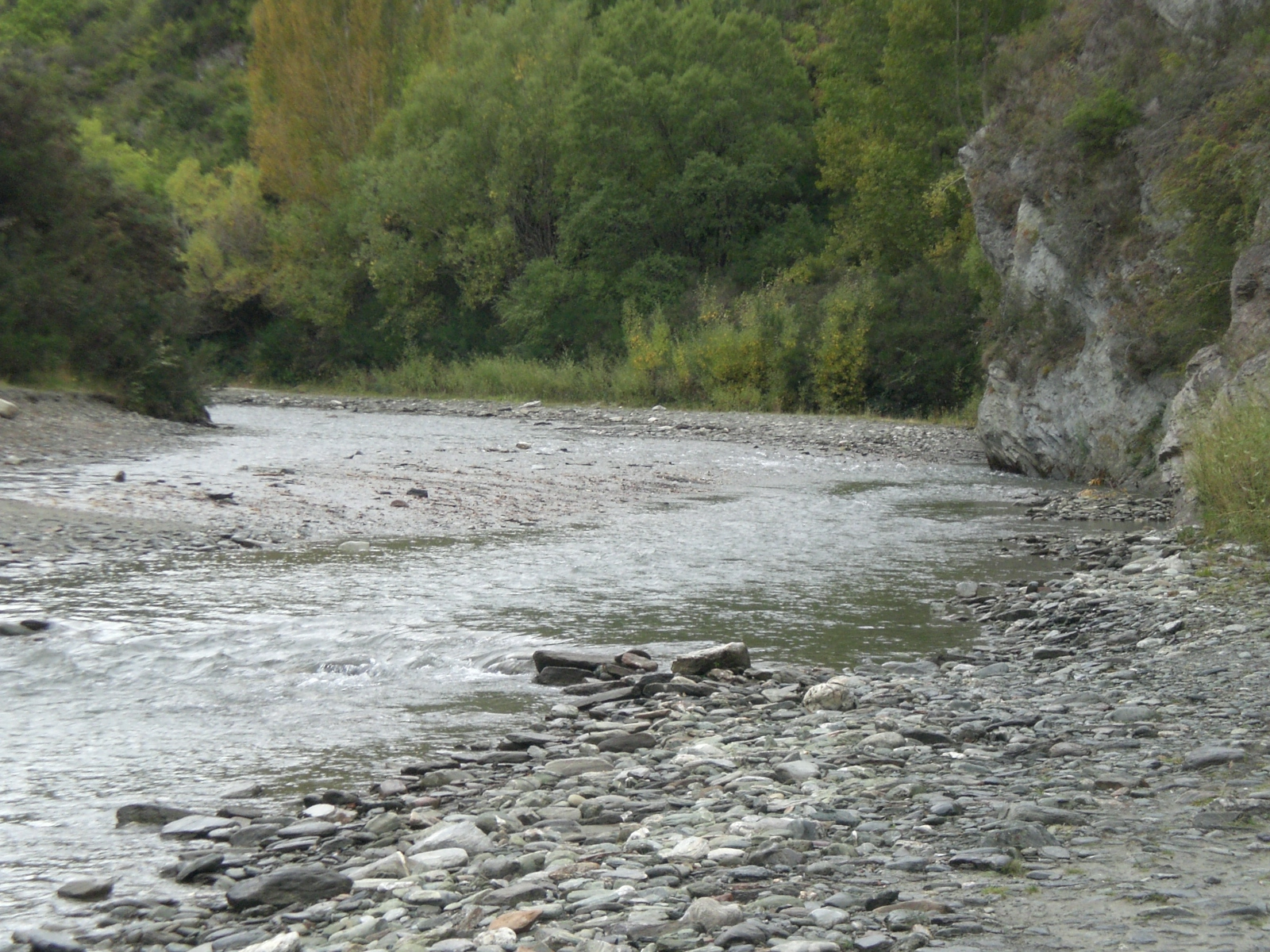
- Arrow River

- Location of mouth
- Course of Arrow River

Location
- Country: New Zealand

Physical characteristics
- Mouth: Kawarau River
  - location: near Arrow Junction
  - coordinates: 45°01′S 168°53′E
- Length: 20 km (12 mi)

Basin features
- Progression: Kawarau River→ Clutha River
- Bridges: Arrow River Bridges Trail bridges

The Arrow River (Māori: Haehaenui) is a short river in Otago, New Zealand. It is a tributary of the Kawarau River, which in turn feeds into the Clutha River. The historic gold mining town of Arrowtown lies on the banks of the Arrow River.

== History ==
The river was originally called Haehaenui, meaning "big scratches," by Māori who used to visit this area during summer for hunting weka and as a route to the West Coast to gather pounamu.

A very small amount of gold was discovered in the Arrow River by Jack Tewa in August 1862. In early October of the same year, much larger finds were made by John McGregor and Peter Stewart of the McGregor and Low party, and by William Fox. Disagreements arose between these individuals regarding who made the initial significant discovery.

The discovery of gold in the Arrow River sparked a major influx of prospectors and was an important part of the Otago Gold Rush of the 1860s. The river and the surrounding area became a hive of mining activity, leading to the rapid growth of Arrowtown.

== Geography ==
The Arrow River originates in the Southern Alps, near the Crown Range, and flows generally south-east for approximately 20 kilometers before joining the Kawarau River near Arrow Junction. The river's course is characterised by a relatively steep gradient in its upper reaches, flowing through a narrow valley. As it approaches Arrowtown, the valley widens, and the river meanders across a floodplain.

== Ecology ==
The Arrow River supports a variety of freshwater life, including populations of trout (both rainbow trout and brown trout). The water quality has been impacted by historical gold mining activities, but ongoing efforts aim to mitigate these effects.

== In popular culture ==
The Arrow River gained international recognition as a filming location for Peter Jackson's The Lord of the Rings film trilogy. The scene where Arwen challenged the Nazgûl while rushing Frodo to Rivendell was filmed at a ford across the river.

== Recreation ==
Today, the Arrow River is a popular spot for recreational activities. Visitors can try their hand at gold panning, a nod to the area's rich history. The Arrow River Bridges Trail, part of the Queenstown Trail, follows the river's banks and offers scenic walking and cycling opportunities, crossing several historic and modern bridges. Fishing is also a common activity in the river.
