= Queenstown cryptosporidiosis outbreak =

2023 outbreak in New Zealand

In September 2023, an outbreak of cryptosporidiosis, a parasitic illness, started in Queenstown, New Zealand. It was Queenstown's first gastroenteritis outbreak in 40 years. Queenstown issued a water boil notice on 18 September, which ended on 8 December. The most probable cause of the outbreak was human faecal matter. During the outbreak, district mayor Glyn Lewers was concerned with how it would impact the town's reputation. Most cases were between the ages of 15 and 39, but there was a case under the age of 10. As of 29 September 2023, three people had been hospitalised, all of whom had been discharged.

== Timeline ==
On 8 September 2023, after various social media posts about people getting sick, the Queenstown-Lakes District Council (QLDC) increased their levels of monitoring and testing, including residual chlorine level checks, and tests for E. coli and other bugs. After many of these tests, on 14 September, the council said that the water supply in Fernhill was not contaminated, but they said that it cannot be ruled out. On the afternoon of 18 September, the council issued a notice urging people in Queenstown to boil their water for at least a minute or use bottled water. At that point, eight cases were known and it was not yet known if the water supply was the culprit. It was that day, cryptosporidiosis became the known cause of the sicknesses previously reported on social media. Around 24 September, investigators further broadened their search for the source outside of the water supply. Heat maps of cases showed that they were mostly from the central business district. Flooding during the outbreak in the South Island caused temporary difficulty investigating the source. On 29 September, temporary ultraviolet disinfecting equipment was ordered with an installation timeframe at Two Mile on 8 December.

On 21 September, parasitologist Bruce Russell from the University of Otago said that the timing of the outbreak and seasonal changes may indicate that the outbreak could have been caused by animal waste contaminating the water supply. That same day, the adult spa pool at Alpine Aqualand was closed as a precaution. Other pools around the area were kept open, and followed Recreation Aotearoa's pool protocol for crypto outbreaks, which included cancelling swimming lessons for children under the age of 8. On 5 October the boil water notice for Kelvin Heights was lifted.

On 5 October, the QLDC lifted the boil water notice for some Queenstown suburbs and Frankton after isolating the water supply from the Kelvin Heights treatment plant, which had already installed a barrier against cryptosporidiosis. On 6 October, Te Whatu Ora said that the most likely source of the outbreak is human faecal matter contaminating the water supply from Lake Wakatipu. Possible contamination sources identified included dispersal from watercraft, swimmers, or wastewater overflows. Te Whatu Ora said that faecal matter from one person is enough to cause the outbreak.

The boil notice for Queenstown was lifted on 8 December 2023, after the district had met its compliance order of installing UV filters.

== Cases ==
Date (2023)	Confirmed cases	Probable cases	Under investigation	Reference
19 September	15			
21 September	18			
23 September	29			
24 September	30			
29 September	48	12	3	
1 October	56	12	8	
3 October	60	13	10	
6 October	62	18	24	
10 October	65	18	26	
14 November	72	20	2	

There was a total of 76 confirmed cases and 21 probable cases.

== Responses ==
On 21 September, Taumata Arowai gave the Queenstown-Lakes District Council a compliance order to upgrade its water supply to ensure that it is safe. This was done although the water supply had not been found to be contaminated. It was reported that a membrane barrier that this would require would cost $30 million. On 23 September the council sourced a UV water filter from Waimakariri District Council to place in a water treatment plant.

On 5 October, Taumata Arowai published a list of 84 water suppliers did not have adequate UV filtering facilities to protect against protozoa organisms. This list affected over 310,000 people across a total of 27 councils, including 169,000 Christchurch residents. The Christchurch and Wainui water suppliers were identified as lacking a protozoa barrier. Other affected councils included the Queenstown-Lakes District Council, the Waimakariri District Council, the Grey District Council and Gore District Council. Taumata Arowai's head of regulatory Steve Taylor confirmed that the water regulator had written to all affected council, government and private suppliers, informing them that they had until 30 June 2024 to develop plans for installing protozoa barriers. On 6 October, Taylor stated during an interview with Newstalk ZB broadcaster Mike Hosking that Taumata Arowai preferred to avoid prosecuting water suppliers and councils in order to ensure that money was invested in the infrastructure needed to keep water safe. The councils have until the end of 2025 to install the barriers. As of March 2025, 41 suppliers—14 councils—have installed the barriers, but 10 councils may not meet the deadline, either because of postponements or because they have chosen other ways to comply.
