= Moke Lake =

Lake in New Zealand

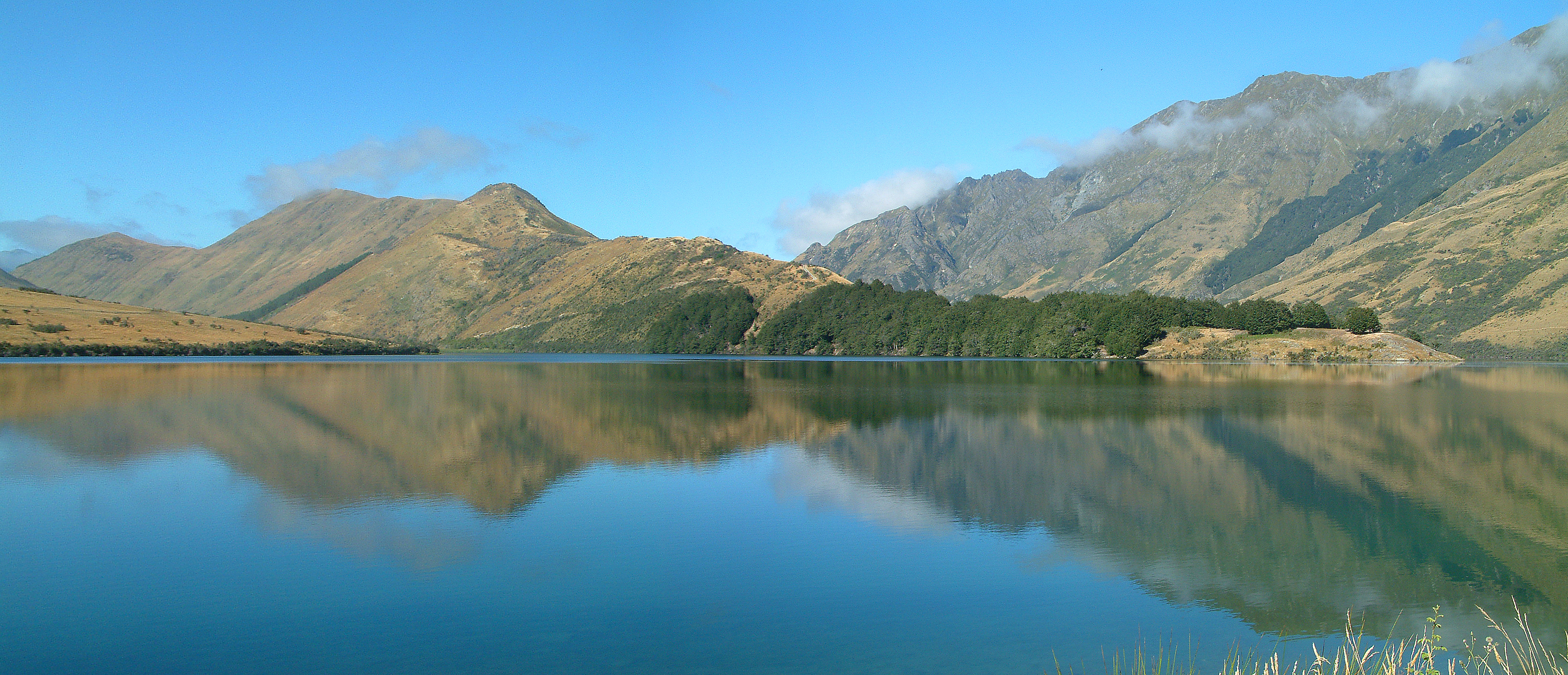
- Moke Lake during morning

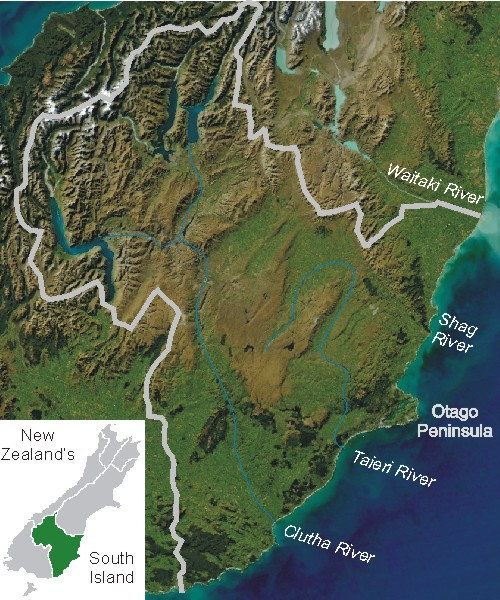
- Location within Otago peninsula
- Interactive map of Moke Lake
- Location: Closeburn, Queenstown, South Island
- Coordinates: 44.99811782°S 168.57308923°E
- Basin countries: New Zealand

Moke Lake is a small lake near the suburb of Closeburn in Queenstown, in the South Island of New Zealand.

== Names ==
Ngāi Tahu call the lakes Punamāhaka and Waikāmāhaka. Both mean “twin waters”, describing the peculiar shape of the lake.

Moke Lake and Moke Creek were named after an old mule on a farm there.

== Description ==
The lake is a popular recreation spot, especially during summer. Popular activities there include boating, camping, horseback riding, and swimming. The boat speed on the lake is limited to 5 km/h.

A track encircles the lake which also links up with Lake Dispute. Additionally, the Moonlight Track connects up with Arthurs Point.

The dirt access road which heads inland from the Glenorchy-Queenstown Road passes by the nearby, smaller Lake Kirkpatrick.

The Department of Conservation campsite and parking area is at the far end of the lake.

== In popular culture ==
In the 2013 BBC miniseries Top of the Lake, the scenes in the women's commune were filmed at Moke Lake.
