= Closeburn =

Closeburn may refer to:

- Closeburn, Queensland, a locality in the Moreton Bay Region, Australia
- Closeburn, Dumfries and Galloway, in Scotland
- Closeburn, Queenstown, in New Zealand
