= Quail Rise =

- Suburb
- Interactive map of Quail Rise
- Coordinates: 45.000542°S 168.754868°E
- Country: New Zealand
- City: Queenstown
- Local authority: Queenstown-Lakes District Council
- Electoral ward: Queenstown-Wakatipu Ward

Area
  - Land: 627 ha (1,550 acres)

Population (June 2025)
  - Total: 770
  - Density: 120/km^{2} (320/sq mi)

	Wakatipu Basin	Millbrook Resort
Queenstown Hill	Quail Rise	Lake Hayes Estate
Frankton		Shotover Country

Quail Rise is a residential suburb of Queenstown in the South Island of New Zealand.

Development of the circa 200 residential sections started around 1996 with the final sections being released in 2012. More than 50 percent of the suburb is open space with landscaping being encouraged.

The only access to this area is via Tucker Beach Road, which is connected to State Highway 6.

== Demographics ==
Quail Rise covers 6.27 km^{2} (2.42 sq mi) and had an estimated population of 770 as of June 2025, with a population density of 123 people per km^{2}.

Historical population
Year	Pop.	±% p.a.
2006	351	—
2013	543	+6.43%
2018	708	+5.45%

Quail Rise had a population of 708 at the 2018 New Zealand census, an increase of 165 people (30.4%) since the 2013 census, and an increase of 357 people (101.7%) since the 2006 census. There were 234 households, comprising 372 males and 339 females, giving a sex ratio of 1.1 males per female. The median age was 40.5 years (compared with 37.4 years nationally), with 153 people (21.6%) aged under 15 years, 99 (14.0%) aged 15 to 29, 354 (50.0%) aged 30 to 64, and 105 (14.8%) aged 65 or older.

Ethnicities were 88.1% European/Pākehā, 4.2% Māori, 1.3% Pasifika, 9.3% Asian, and 4.2% other ethnicities. People may identify with more than one ethnicity.

The percentage of people born overseas was 32.6, compared with 27.1% nationally.

Although some people chose not to answer the census's question about religious affiliation, 60.2% had no religion, 32.2% were Christian, 0.4% were Muslim, 0.8% were Buddhist and 2.5% had other religions.

Of those at least 15 years old, 180 (32.4%) people had a bachelor's or higher degree, and 33 (5.9%) people had no formal qualifications. The median income was $49,200, compared with $31,800 nationally. 171 people (30.8%) earned over $70,000 compared to 17.2% nationally. The employment status of those at least 15 was that 318 (57.3%) people were employed full-time, and 114 (20.5%) were part-time.
