= Frankton, New Zealand =

There are two towns called Frankton in New Zealand:

- Frankton, Otago is located close to Queenstown in the South Island
- Frankton, Waikato is located close to Hamilton in the North Island
