= Queenstown, New Zealand =

Resort town in New Zealand's South Island

Queenstown Tāhuna (Māori)
- Resort town
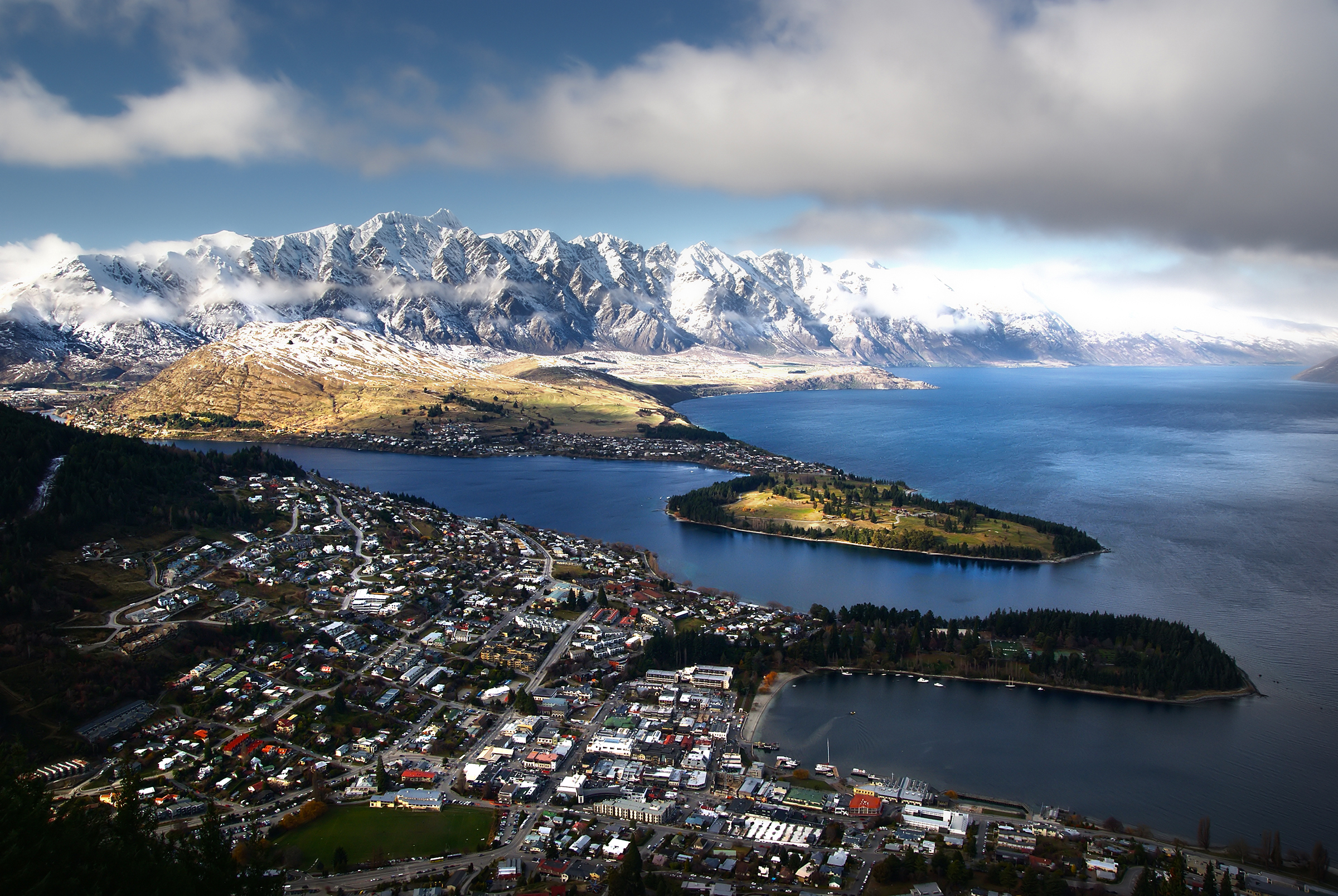
- Queenstown from Bob's Peak
- Interactive map of Queenstown
- Coordinates: 45°01′52″S 168°39′45″E
- Country: New Zealand
- Region: Otago
- Territorial authority: Queenstown-Lakes District
- Named: January 1863
- Founder: William Gilbert Rees
- Electorates: Southland; Te Tai Tonga

Government
  - Mayor: John Glover
  - MPs: Joseph Mooney (National); Tākuta Ferris (Te Pāti Māori)

Area
  - Urban: 86.61 km^{2} (33.44 sq mi)
- Elevation: 330 m (1,080 ft)

Population (June 2025)
  - Urban: 29,000
  - Urban density: 330/km^{2} (870/sq mi)
  - District: 53,800
- Time zone: UTC+12:00 (NZST)
  - Summer (DST): UTC+13:00 (NZDT)
- Postcode(s): 9300
- Area code: 03
- Local iwi: Ngāi Tahu
- Website: qldc.govt.nz

Queenstown (Māori: Tāhuna) is a resort town in Otago in the south-west of New Zealand's South Island. It is the largest town in the Queenstown-Lakes District, and the primary administrative centre.

The town is on the northwestern edge of Lake Wakatipu, a long, thin, S-shaped lake formed by glacial processes, and has views of nearby mountains such as The Remarkables, Cecil Peak, Walter Peak and, just above the town, Ben Lomond and Queenstown Hill. Queenstown is known for its tourism businesses, especially adventure and ski tourism.

== Toponymy ==
Tāhuna, the Māori-language name for Queenstown, means 'shallow bay'.

Queenstown was initially just known as 'The Station' after William Gilbert Rees' station, as the settlement existed on his run holding. The settlement was also known as 'The Camp' and 'Canvastown'. On 5 January 1863 the name Queenstown was adopted, likely after Queenstown, Ireland, which had been recently renamed following a visit by Queen Victoria.

== History ==
=== Māori settlement and presence ===
The area was discovered and first settled by Māori. Kāi Tahu say that the lake was dug by the Waitaha ancestor, Rākaihautū, with his kō (digging stick) named Tūwhakaroria. After arriving at Whakatū Nelson in the waka Uruao, Rākaihautū divided his crew into two. He led one group through the interior of Te Waipounamu, digging the freshwater lakes of the island. After digging the lakes Hāwea, Wānaka, and Whakatipu Waimāori, he travelled through the Greenstone and Hollyford valleys before finally digging Whakatipu Waitai (Lake McKerrow).

The first non-Māori to see Lake Wakatipu was European Nathanael Chalmers who was guided by Reko, the chief of the Tuturau, over the Waimea Plains and up the Mataura River in September 1853. Evidence of stake nets, baskets for catching eels, spears and ashes indicated the Glenorchy area was visited by Māori. It is likely Ngāi Tahu Māori visited Queenstown en route to collect Pounamu (greenstone). The tribe of Kāti Māmoe occupied a settlement called Te Kirikiri Pa where the Queenstown Gardens are today, but by the time European migrants arrived in the 1860s this settlement was no longer being used.

=== European settlement ===
European explorers William Gilbert Rees and Nicholas von Tunzelmann were the first non-Māori to settle the area. In 1860, Rees established a high country farm where Queenstown's town centre now stands, but the discovery of gold in the Arrow River in 1862 encouraged him to convert his wool shed into a hotel named the Queen's Arms, now known as Eichardt's. The settlement swiftly grew after the discovery of gold with hotels and entertainment venues erected to provide for the prospectors. Market gardens shortly followed and replaced the need for produce to be transported from Dunedin to the town. By the start of 1864 Queenstown had multiple shops, several bars, a post office, a local newspaper, both an Anglican and Catholic church, and a timber yard.

The wider Wakatipu basin was extensively farmed during this period. Prior to 1872 it was not possible to purchase freehold farmland and settlers were required to lease from the Crown. The basin's original runs were smaller but by the 1930's had been amalgamated into larger stations including Mt Aurum, The Branches, Coronet peak, Soho, Glencoe, Eastburn, Waitiri, Wentworth, Mt Rosa, Glenroy, Cone Peak, Kawarau Falls, Remarkables, Ben Lomond, Closeburn, and Mt Creighton. Ben Lomond Station itself was first leased by P.B. Boult in 1864 at approximately 10,000 acres. By 1903 the station had grown to 32,000 acres. In 1930, William Price McDonald took over the lease from the crown and the family held the property for the following two decades.

Many Queenstown streets bear names from the gold mining era (such as Camp Street) and some historic buildings remain. William's Cottage, the Lake Lodge of Ophir (now Artbay Gallery), Queenstown Police Station, and St Peter's Anglican Church lie close together in a designated historic precinct.

==== 1999 flooding ====
There was a severe weather event in the South Island in November 1999, bringing torrential rainfall in the catchments of Lake Wakatipu. The level of the lake rose from 310.5 m to 312.77 m, leading to the most severe flooding in Queenstown's recorded history. Properties in central Queenstown close to the lakeshore were flooded up to 1 m deep, causing major damage. Total insurance claims were around $50 million. Properties in Glenorchy and Kingston were also flooded, and the road from Queenstown to Glenorchy was damaged by washouts.

== Geography ==
Queenstown is on the shore of Lake Wakatipu, New Zealand's third-largest lake by surface area. The town is close to the lake's northeastern bend, at which point a small arm, the Frankton Arm, joins the lake with its principal outflow, the Kawarau River. The centre of the town is on the north shore at the point where the Frankton Arm links with the main body of the lake, but also extends to the major suburb of Frankton at the eastern end of the arm, and across to Kelvin Heights on the Kelvin Peninsula, which forms the Frankton Arm's southern shore.

The town is at a relatively low altitude for a ski and snowboarding centre, at 310 metres (1,020 ft) above sea level at the lake shore, but is nestled among mountains, most notably the scenic attraction of The Remarkables, to the town's southeast. Below the lake lies the deep Kawarau Gorge, and there are nearby plains suitable for agriculture and viticulture. Queenstown lies close to the heart of the Central Otago wine region.

=== Suburbs ===
Central Queenstown contains many businesses, apartments and homes but is near many suburbs or large areas of housing: Fernhill, Sunshine Bay, Queenstown Hill, Goldfield Heights, Marina Heights, Kelvin Heights, Arthurs Point and Frankton.

Just outside Queenstown are the areas of: Arrowtown, Closeburn, Dalefield, Gibbston, Jack's Point, Hanley's Farm, Hayes Creek, Lake Hayes Estate, Shotover Country and Quail Rise.

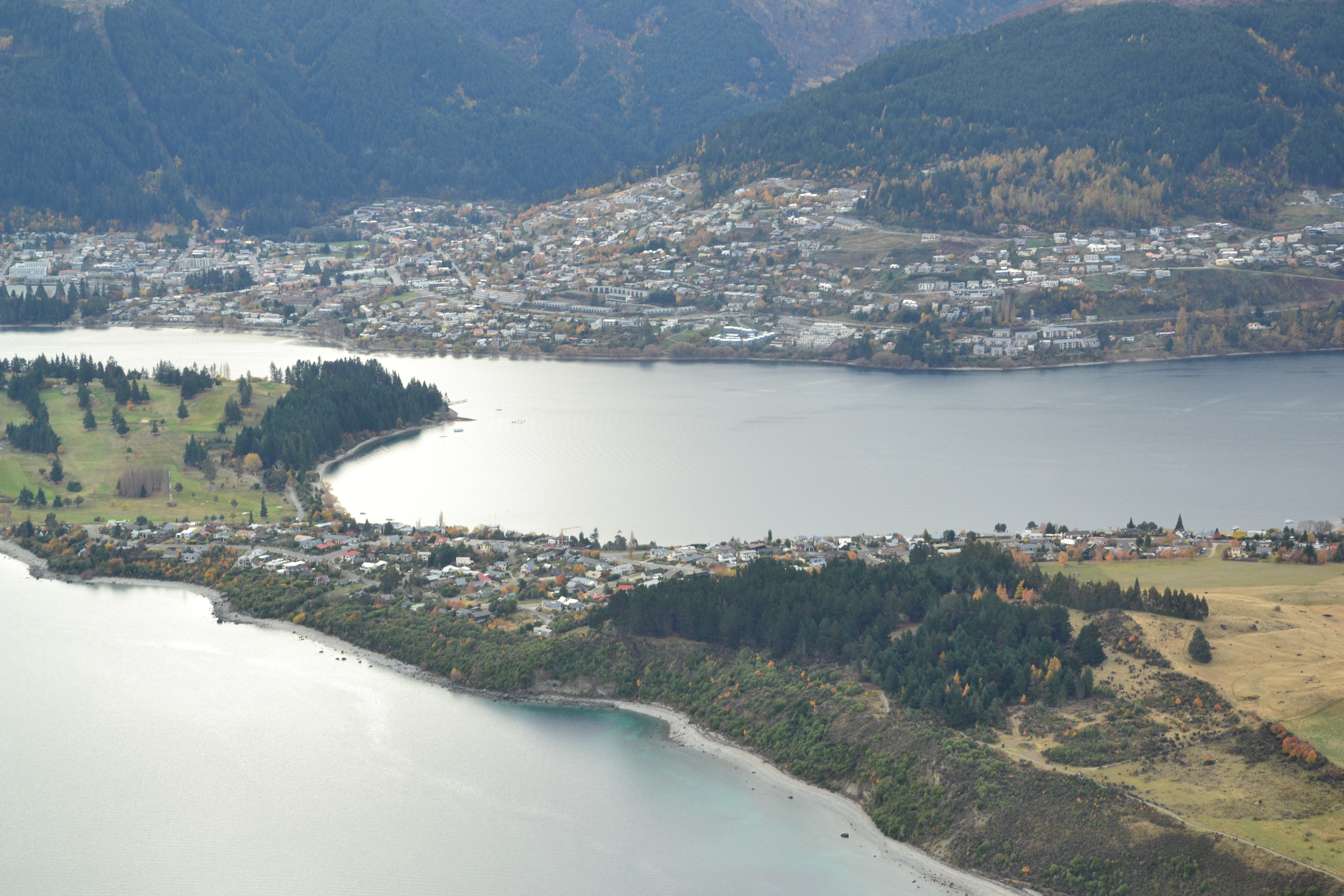
Housing in Queenstown (top) and Kelvin Heights (bottom)

=== Climate ===
Because of its relatively moderate altitude (310 metres) and high mountain surroundings, Queenstown has an oceanic climate (Köppen climate classification Cfb). Summer has long warm days with temperatures that can reach 30 °C while winters are cold with temperatures often in single digits and frequent snowfall, although there is no permanent snow cover during the year. As with the rest of Central Otago, Queenstown lies within the rain shadow of the Southern Alps, but being closer to the west coast the town is more susceptible to rain-bearing fronts than nearby Cromwell, Wānaka and Alexandra. The hottest recorded temperature in Queenstown is 35.2 °C (95 °F) and the coldest is −8.4 °C (17 °F), while for Queenstown Airport the hottest is 33.4 °C (92 °F) and the coldest is −12.2 °C (10 °F).

Climate data for Queenstown Airport (1991–2020 normals, extremes 1968–present)
Month	Jan	Feb	Mar	Apr	May	Jun	Jul	Aug	Sep	Oct	Nov	Dec	Year
Record high °C (°F)	33.4 (92.1)	32.2 (90.0)	30.0 (86.0)	25.1 (77.2)	21.3 (70.3)	19.4 (66.9)	17.9 (64.2)	19.7 (67.5)	23.3 (73.9)	26.0 (78.8)	28.5 (83.3)	30.0 (86.0)	33.4 (92.1)
Mean maximum °C (°F)	28.3 (82.9)	27.9 (82.2)	25.3 (77.5)	21.2 (70.2)	18.0 (64.4)	14.7 (58.5)	13.9 (57.0)	15.6 (60.1)	18.8 (65.8)	21.9 (71.4)	24.1 (75.4)	26.9 (80.4)	29.5 (85.1)
Mean daily maximum °C (°F)	22.0 (71.6)	21.8 (71.2)	19.1 (66.4)	15.2 (59.4)	11.9 (53.4)	8.6 (47.5)	8.2 (46.8)	10.2 (50.4)	13.0 (55.4)	15.4 (59.7)	17.5 (63.5)	20.2 (68.4)	15.3 (59.5)
Daily mean °C (°F)	15.9 (60.6)	15.6 (60.1)	13.2 (55.8)	9.8 (49.6)	7.1 (44.8)	4.1 (39.4)	3.4 (38.1)	5.2 (41.4)	7.7 (45.9)	9.9 (49.8)	11.9 (53.4)	14.3 (57.7)	9.8 (49.6)
Mean daily minimum °C (°F)	9.9 (49.8)	9.5 (49.1)	7.3 (45.1)	4.5 (40.1)	2.3 (36.1)	−0.4 (31.3)	−1.4 (29.5)	0.2 (32.4)	2.4 (36.3)	4.4 (39.9)	6.2 (43.2)	8.5 (47.3)	4.5 (40.1)
Mean minimum °C (°F)	3.4 (38.1)	3.1 (37.6)	1.3 (34.3)	−1.3 (29.7)	−3.1 (26.4)	−5.0 (23.0)	−6.2 (20.8)	−4.4 (24.1)	−2.9 (26.8)	−1.7 (28.9)	−0.2 (31.6)	2.4 (36.3)	−6.4 (20.5)
Record low °C (°F)	0.3 (32.5)	0.5 (32.9)	−1.6 (29.1)	−4.5 (23.9)	−8.8 (16.2)	−10.3 (13.5)	−12.2 (10.0)	−7.8 (18.0)	−5.0 (23.0)	−4.2 (24.4)	−2.1 (28.2)	−1.0 (30.2)	−12.2 (10.0)
Average rainfall mm (inches)	71.6 (2.82)	51.0 (2.01)	49.3 (1.94)	57.5 (2.26)	75.1 (2.96)	62.2 (2.45)	55.8 (2.20)	52.8 (2.08)	62.3 (2.45)	62.4 (2.46)	60.7 (2.39)	60.3 (2.37)	721 (28.39)
Average rainy days (≥ 1.0 mm)	7.6	6.5	7.3	7.3	9.7	8.6	7.8	8.1	8.3	8.4	7.7	8.7	96
Average relative humidity (%)	69.7	75.5	78.4	79.9	83.8	86.1	85.4	82.1	74.1	72.6	68.9	69.1	77.1
Mean monthly sunshine hours	236.9	209.3	180.0	136.2	83.8	69.3	85.2	119.5	151.0	197.0	217.9	212.6	1,898.7
Mean daily daylight hours	15.2	13.9	12.4	10.8	9.5	8.8	9.2	10.3	11.8	13.4	14.8	15.6	12.1
Percentage possible sunshine	50	53	47	42	28	26	30	37	43	47	49	44	41
Source 1: NIWA
Source 2: Weather Spark

Climate data for Queenstown Gardens (1991–2020 normals, extremes 1871–1881, 1930–2021)
Month	Jan	Feb	Mar	Apr	May	Jun	Jul	Aug	Sep	Oct	Nov	Dec	Year
Record high °C (°F)	35.2 (95.4)	33.4 (92.1)	30.7 (87.3)	27.3 (81.1)	21.7 (71.1)	19.8 (67.6)	17.6 (63.7)	20.5 (68.9)	24.3 (75.7)	26.8 (80.2)	29.8 (85.6)	31.7 (89.1)	35.2 (95.4)
Mean maximum °C (°F)	30.0 (86.0)	29.6 (85.3)	26.7 (80.1)	22.3 (72.1)	18.7 (65.7)	15.2 (59.4)	14.4 (57.9)	16.4 (61.5)	19.9 (67.8)	23.1 (73.6)	25.7 (78.3)	28.4 (83.1)	31.1 (88.0)
Mean daily maximum °C (°F)	23.4 (74.1)	23.2 (73.8)	20.5 (68.9)	16.3 (61.3)	12.6 (54.7)	9.4 (48.9)	9.0 (48.2)	11.0 (51.8)	14.0 (57.2)	16.7 (62.1)	19.0 (66.2)	21.6 (70.9)	16.4 (61.5)
Daily mean °C (°F)	17.2 (63.0)	16.9 (62.4)	14.6 (58.3)	11.2 (52.2)	8.2 (46.8)	5.2 (41.4)	4.6 (40.3)	6.3 (43.3)	8.9 (48.0)	11.1 (52.0)	13.1 (55.6)	15.6 (60.1)	11.1 (52.0)
Mean daily minimum °C (°F)	11.0 (51.8)	10.6 (51.1)	8.6 (47.5)	6.0 (42.8)	3.7 (38.7)	1.1 (34.0)	0.2 (32.4)	1.6 (34.9)	3.8 (38.8)	5.5 (41.9)	7.3 (45.1)	9.6 (49.3)	5.8 (42.4)
Mean minimum °C (°F)	5.2 (41.4)	5.2 (41.4)	3.5 (38.3)	1.3 (34.3)	−0.5 (31.1)	−2.8 (27.0)	−3.9 (25.0)	−2.3 (27.9)	−0.7 (30.7)	0.5 (32.9)	1.8 (35.2)	4.2 (39.6)	−4.3 (24.3)
Record low °C (°F)	0.7 (33.3)	1.2 (34.2)	0.0 (32.0)	−1.7 (28.9)	−6.7 (19.9)	−6.6 (20.1)	−8.4 (16.9)	−6.1 (21.0)	−4.1 (24.6)	−2.5 (27.5)	−1.6 (29.1)	0.8 (33.4)	−8.4 (16.9)
Average rainfall mm (inches)	78.6 (3.09)	65.0 (2.56)	60.2 (2.37)	68.9 (2.71)	90.7 (3.57)	74.8 (2.94)	73.0 (2.87)	82.1 (3.23)	81.3 (3.20)	83.3 (3.28)	75.9 (2.99)	75.3 (2.96)	909.1 (35.77)
Source: NIWA

=== Flood risk ===
Low-lying areas of Queenstown close to Lake Wakatipu are at risk of flooding because during heavy rain and snowmelt, the lake's outflows via the Kawarau River are less than the inflows and the lake level can rise significantly. Further, the outflow down the Kawarau River is impeded by the large delta of the Shotover River – a major tributary. A narrow gorge also restricts flow in the Kawarau river. As a consequence, Queenstown has been flooded several times, and there is an ongoing risk of flooding in low-lying areas. As the lake level rises, backflow through the town's stormwater system leads to flooding in some streets when the lake level reaches 311.3 m. This has occurred around 20 times since 1878. In any year, there is a 13% chance that the lake will reach this level. In any ten-year period, there is a 75% chance of an event that exceeds this level.

== Demography ==
Queenstown is described by Statistics New Zealand as a medium urban area with an area of 86.61 km^{2} (33.44 sq mi). It had an urban population of 29,000 (June 2025), making it the 24th-largest urban area in New Zealand. In 2016, Queenstown overtook Oamaru to become the second-largest urban area in Otago, behind Dunedin. Prior to 2023, the Queenstown urban area as defined by Statistics New Zealand didn't include Lake Hayes or Arthurs Point, which are contiguous with Queenstown but were designated as separate urban areas.

Historical population
Year	Pop.	±% p.a.
2006	10,428	—
2013	11,334	+1.20%
2018	13,539	+3.62%

Before the 2023 census, the town had a smaller boundary, covering 28.40 km^{2} (10.97 sq mi). Using that boundary, the Queenstown urban area had a population of 13,539 at the 2018 New Zealand census, an increase of 2,205 people (19.5%) since the 2013 census, and an increase of 3,111 people (29.8%) since the 2006 census. There were 4,254 households. There were 7,089 males and 6,447 females, giving a sex ratio of 1.1 males per female, with 1,341 people (9.9%) aged under 15 years, 4,887 (36.1%) aged 15 to 29, 6,264 (46.3%) aged 30 to 64, and 1,041 (7.7%) aged 65 or older.

Ethnicities were 71.2% European/Pākehā, 4.5% Māori, 1.2% Pacific peoples, 17.8% Asian, and 10.5% other ethnicities (totals add to more than 100% since people could identify with multiple ethnicities).

The proportion of people born overseas was 58.3%, compared with 27.1% nationally.

Although some people objected to giving their religion, 58.5% had no religion, 29.1% were Christian, 2.8% were Hindu, 0.6% were Muslim, 1.7% were Buddhist and 3.4% had other religions.

Of those at least 15 years old, 3,234 (26.5%) people had a bachelor or higher degree, and 759 (6.2%) people had no formal qualifications. 1,692 people (13.9%) earned over $70,000 compared to 17.2% nationally. The employment status of those at least 15 was that 9,165 (75.1%) people were employed full-time, 1,263 (10.4%) were part-time, and 138 (1.1%) were unemployed.

Individual statistical areas in 2018
Name	Area (km^{2})	Population	Density (per km^{2})	Households	Median age	Median income
Frankton	7.62	2,895	380	1,017	32.8 years	$39,300
Frankton Arm	1.20	1,917	1,598	603	31.2 years	$41,200
Kelvin Heights	9.28	1,170	126	447	43.4 years	$44,800
Queenstown Central	0.81	1,017	1,256	261	30.0 years	$34,300
Quail Rise	6.27	708	113	234	40.5 years	$49,200
Queenstown East	0.98	1,416	1,445	441	30.5 years	$38,800
Sunshine Bay-Fernhill	1.31	2,931	2,237	861	29.6 years	$37,600
Warren Park	0.94	1,485	1,580	390	28.7 years	$34,200
New Zealand					37.4 years	$31,800

== Economy ==
The economy of Queenstown is a major contributor to the economy of the Queenstown Lakes District, although the district covers a much wider area than Queenstown, and includes the towns of Wānaka to the north-east, Glenorchy to the north-west and Kingston to the south.

=== Housing ===
Residential housing in the Queenstown area is expensive due to factors such as the town being a tourist destination, its lack of land and its desirability to foreigners and investors. Queenstown is rated the least affordable place in New Zealand to buy a property, overtaking Auckland at the start of 2017. In December 2016 the average house price in the Queenstown area rose to $1 million NZD. Between 2016 and 2019, average rents in Queenstown rose progressively; reaching 10.8% in 2016, 16% in 2017, and 7.4% in 2018, and 9.6% in 2019. 2018 census data showed 27 percent of Queenstown homes were marked as unoccupied.

During the early 2020s, Queenstown experienced a decline in rental housing. Between December 2021 and December 2022, the online auction platform Trade Me reported a 49% decline in rental listings across the Queenstown-Lakes District. Similarly, the Ministry of Business, Innovation and Employment (MBIE) reported that the number of rental houses in the District had dropped by 100 between November 2021 and November 2022. Despite a building boom in 2022, Stuff reported that 27% of homes in the Lakes District were unoccupied since their owners preferred to use them as holiday homes or short-term accommodation rather than rentals By November 2022, Radio New Zealand reported that the average home in the Lakes District cost NZ$1.7 million while a three-bedroom rental cost a minimum of NZ$800 per week and a single bedroom rental NZ$500 or more per week.

In October 2022, Environment Minister David Parker confirmed that the New Zealand Government had fast-tracked the Te Pūtahi project at Lake Hayes Estate to build 748 more homes, a public transport area, and a possible school.

By early 2023, Stuff, Radio New Zealand, and The New Zealand Herald reported that a shortage of rental housing had forced many workers and businesspeople to sleep in cars, couches, tents, visitor hostels, and others to leave the town. In addition, the housing shortage had contributed to a worker shortage among local businesses since they had trouble attracting foreign visa workers or those from outside Queenstown. The Herald also reported that some workers in Queenstown were asking local rental agents if they could stay in vacant properties being sold. In late March 2023, 100 people participated in a protest at Queenstown's waterfront to raise awareness of the resort town's acute rental housing shortage. The protest was attended by National Party Southland electorate Member of Parliament Joseph Mooney and Queenstown Lakes District Councillor Craig Ferguson.

=== Employment ===
The area’s growth rate is one of the fastest in the country with the population growing 7.1% from 2015 to 2016 in a 12-month period. Most jobs in Queenstown are tourism- or accommodation-related. Employment growth was also the highest of any area in New Zealand at 10.3% in the March 2016 year.

=== Retail ===
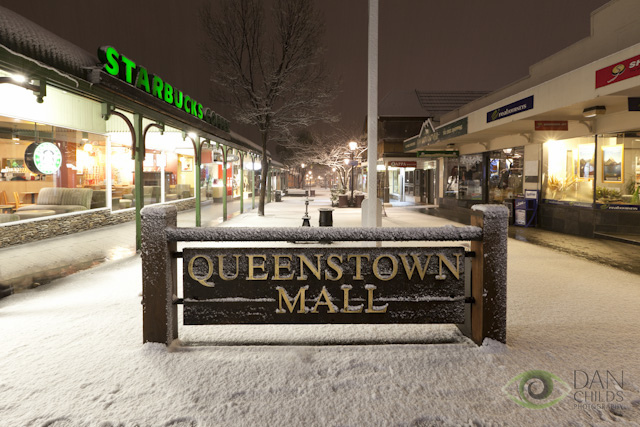
The Queenstown Mall in winter

Queenstown has a tourist-focused shopping area, centred around the Queenstown Mall. The public pedestrian street opened in 1990, and includes Reading Cinemas.

O'Connells Shopping Centre also opened in 1990, and was upgraded from 2020 through 2022.

In 1986, Queenstown was granted an exemption to allow shops to open every day of the year except Christmas Day, Easter Sunday and before 12 noon on Anzac Day (at the time, shops in New Zealand were required to close on Sundays and public holidays). The exemption was extended in 1990 allow shops to open on Easter Sunday. The exemption applies to all shops within a 35-kilometre (22 mi) radius of the intersection of Camp Street and Ballarat Street (the location of the Queenstown post office in 1986), and makes Queenstown and the Lake Wakatipu basin one of only three areas in New Zealand where shops may open on Good Friday (the other two are Picton and Paihia).

== Government ==
=== Local ===
Queenstown lies in the Queenstown-Lakes District territorial authority. It is also part of the Otago region, administered by the Otago Regional Council.

=== National ===
For the New Zealand Parliament, Queenstown is covered by one general electorate, Southland, and one Maori electorate, Te Tai Tonga. As of the 2023 general election, Southland is represented by Joseph Mooney (National) and Te Tai Tonga is represented by Tākuta Ferris (Te Pāti Māori).

== Tourism ==
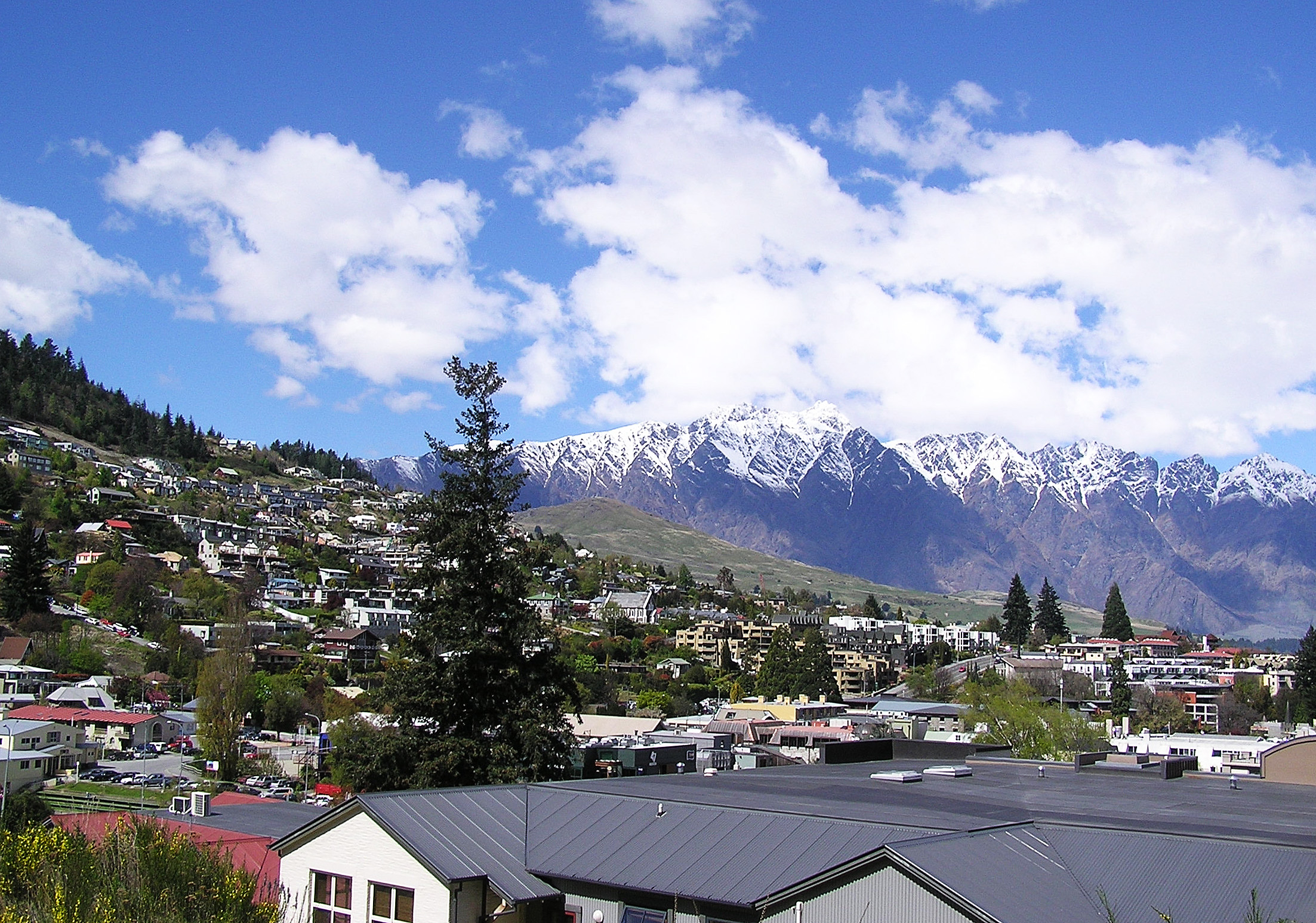
Queenstown and the Remarkable Mountains

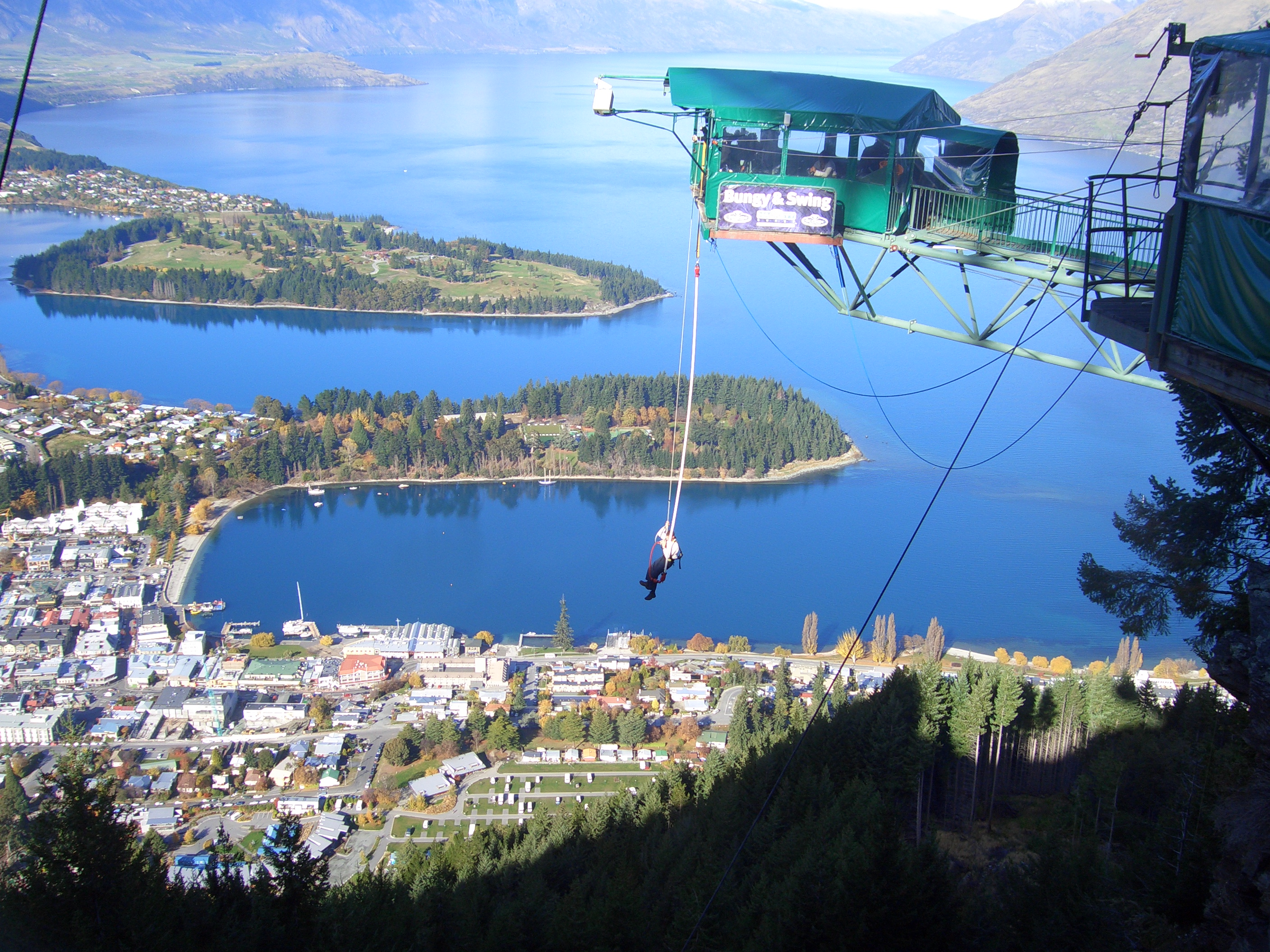
The Ledge Bungy

Tourism is a large component of the Queenstown economy, particularly outdoor and adventure tourism activities including skiing and snowboarding, jet boating, whitewater rafting, bungy jumping, mountain biking, skateboarding, tramping, paragliding, sky diving and fly fishing.

Queenstown is a major centre for snow sports in New Zealand, with four main mountain ski fields: Cardrona Alpine Resort, Coronet Peak, The Remarkables and Treble Cone. Cross country skiing is also available at the Waiorau Snow Farm, near Cardrona village.

A heritage steamship, the twin screw coal fired steamer TSS Earnslaw operates on Lake Wakatipu.

Queenstown lies close to the centre of the world's southernmost wine region, the Central Otago wine region, which has a growing international reputation for its quality Pinot Noir. The Two Paddocks vineyard is owned by internationally known New Zealand actor Sam Neill, and neighbouring, historic Arrowtown features restaurants and bars.

Other tourist activities include Ben Lomond, a nearby mountain with a panoramic outlook on Bob's Peak, and its Skyline Queenstown gondola. Queenstown hosts the Kiwi Park wildlife sanctuary, and Paradise is a nearby rural location known for its paradise duck population (Tadorna variegata). The Queenstown Trail and Skippers Road are popular walking, running, and mountain-biking tracks.

Star-gazing and astrotourism opportunities are available, with two certified dark sky reserves in the district. The Kawarau Gibbston Dark Sky Park is located along the Kawarau River valley between Queenstown and Cromwell, and centred on the small settlement of Gibbston. A much larger dark sky reserve was certified in 2025 as the Tāhuna Glenorchy Dark Sky Sanctuary. This covers an area of 2,150 km^{2} (830 sq mi) at the head of Lake Wakatipu, and includes a large portion of Mount Aspiring National Park. There are no visible light domes in any direction from within the sanctuary because the light dome from Queenstown is shielded by the mountains. One of the attractions of the star-gazing in the Queenstown region is that it is amongst the few places on land where both the core of the Milky Way and the Aurora Australis can be seen.

== Culture ==
=== Festivals ===
Queenstown has many festivals. Examples include the ten-day Bike Festival in January, Winter Festival (June), Jazz Festival (October), and Winter Pride (August–September) the largest winter pride event in the Southern Hemisphere.

=== Locations for television and film ===
Jane Campion's six-part drama mystery Top of the Lake was shot during 2012 for pay TV release in 2013. The lakes of the Wakatipu appear ominous and the Southern Alps spectacular. The main location is Moke Lake and scenes were shot on Lower Beach Street and Coronation Drive, and at a supermarket and bottle store on Shotover Street.

In 2010, Cycle 14 of America's Next Top Model was in part filmed in Queenstown and was won by Krista White. Raina Hein was runner-up.

Queenstown and the surrounding area contain many locations used in The Lord of the Rings film trilogy, including Paradise, near Glenorchy at the head of Lake Wakatipu.

Queenstown became popular in South Asia after the release of Bollywood blockbuster Kaho Naa... Pyaar Hai, which was partially shot there. Queenstown featured for 17 minutes in I Hate Luv Storys, a 2010 Bollywood romantic comedy. Queenstown and the surrounding areas were also used in the 2009 film X-Men Origins: Wolverine. Mee-Shee: The Water Giant was shot in Queenstown in 2005, and released to DVD the same year. Queenstown was also used to film most of the 1988 film The Rescue. Queenstown was the base for filming the 1988 film Willow.

Filming of the 1981 film Race for the Yankee Zephyr took place in and around Queenstown, the area's first major motion picture production.

A 1989 TV Commercial for the Toyota Hilux starring Barry Crump and Lloyd Scott in which the two drive off the cliff was filmed at nearby Queenstown Hill.

The first and last episodes of the fifth season of The Mole were filmed in Queenstown.

The 2017 Filipino drama film Northern Lights was shot entirely on location, with Queenstown substituting for Alaska.

In 2017 the Korean variety show Running Man shot an episode in Queenstown.

The 2020 crime drama One Lane Bridge and the 2024 crime drama A Remarkable Place to Die were filmed in Queenstown. The One Lane Bridge series focuses on events that take place at a bridge over the Dart River / Te Awa Whakatipu.

== Sports and recreation ==
- Rowing at Whakatipu rowing club
- Queenstown Events Centre and stadium
- Paragliding or Hang Gliding
- Aerobatics with the Wakatipu Aero Club at Queenstown Airport at Frankton
- Golf at Millbrook Resort, Jack's Point, or Queenstown Golf Club
- Disc golf at the Queenstown Gardens
- Tennis at the Queenstown Tennis Club in Queenstown Gardens
- Cricket at the Queenstown Cricket Club
- Netball at the Wakatipu Netball Centre
- Rugby league and Rugby union at the Wakatipu Rugby League Club Memorial Park
- Touch rugby during the summer season
- Scuba diving or snorkeling in a river, bridge wreck, or in Lake Wakatipu
- Adventure sport, canyon-swing, parachute, jetboat, bungy jump, river-surf, kitesurf or Canyoning

=== In the area ===
- Central Otago region
- Central Otago wine region
- History of the Otago gold rush
- Fiordland National Park, including the Milford Road and Homer Tunnel to Milford Sound / Piopiotahi, as well as the Fiordland Lakes and Doubtful Sound / Patea
- Tramping track near Glenorchy
- Routeburn, one of the New Zealand Great Walks
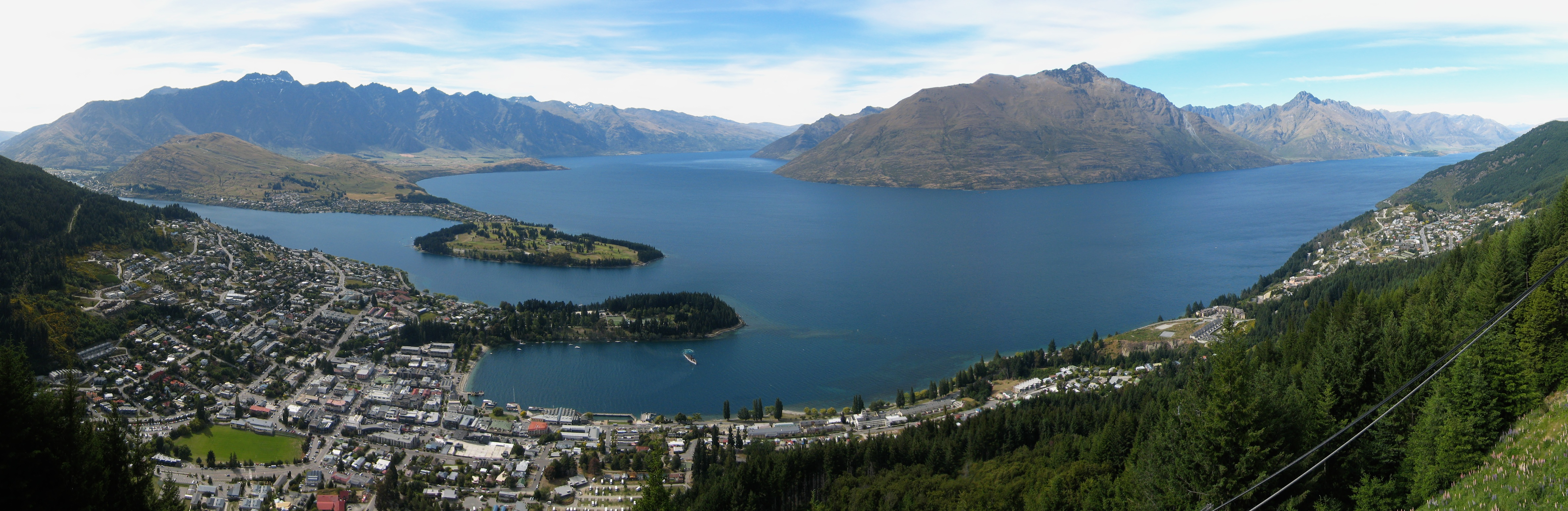
Panorama of Queenstown and Lake Wakatipu from the top of the gondola
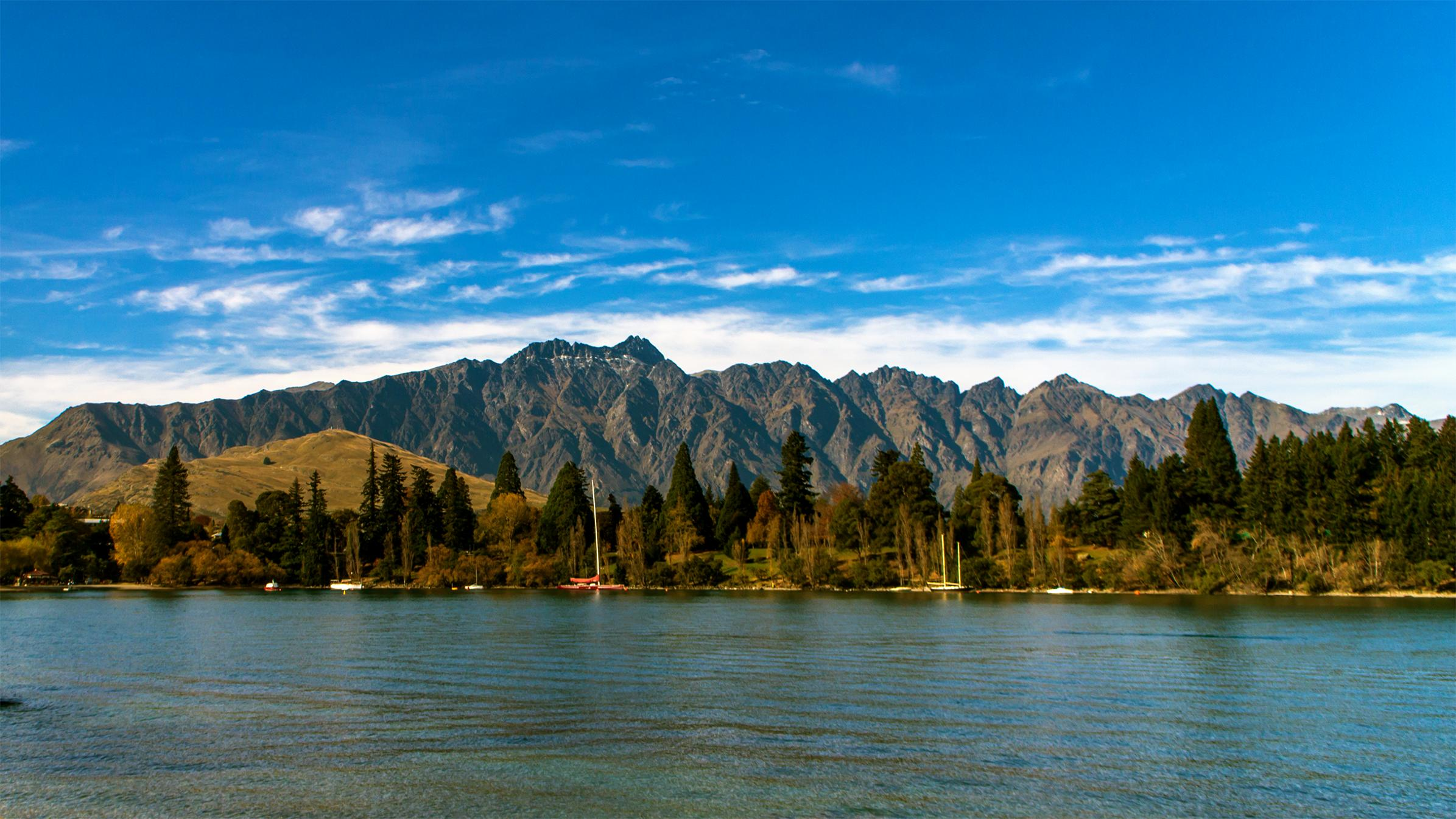
The Remarkables mountain range, autumn 2015

== Education ==
=== Primary schools ===
Queenstown Primary School is a co-educational state primary school for Year 1 to 8 students, with a roll of 514 as of July 2026.

St Joseph's School is a co-educational Catholic state-integrated primary school for Year 1 to 8 students, with a roll of 128.

There are also two primary schools in Frankton and a school in Shotover Country.

=== Secondary schools ===
Wakatipu High School, a state secondary school for Year 9 to 13 students, is located in Frankton.

=== Tertiary education ===
Southern Institute of Technology (SIT), based in Invercargill, has a campus in Queenstown.

Queenstown Resort College is a tertiary education provider focussing on tourism. The college actively supports events for international travel agents.

ACE Wakatipu has a community focus, and provides links to many adult training opportunities.

== Churches ==
=== Saint Andrew's church ===
Saint Andrew's Presbyterian church was completed in 1968 to replace the previous church, which was sold and demolished to reuse the land. The church is designed to seat 350 parishioners. The Presbyterian church has been active in the Wakatipu area since 1865.

=== Saint Peter's church ===
The first Anglican church in Queenstown was constructed in 1863. In 1926 it was decided to build a new church and Henry McDowell Smith was appointed architect. The new church cost £2,862 and work began 21 April 1932, with the foundation stone being laid by the Archdeacon of Central Otago Algy Whitehead on 22 June and the church was consecrated on 23 November by the Bishop of Dunedin Isaac Richards.

=== Saint Joseph's church ===
Saint Joseph's Catholic church was built in 1898. It replaced Queenstown's first Catholic church, built in 1863. It is built from schist sourced from Arthur's Point. Built in the Gothic Revival style, it was designed by the architect Francis Petre. It is a category two historic place.

Queenstown churches

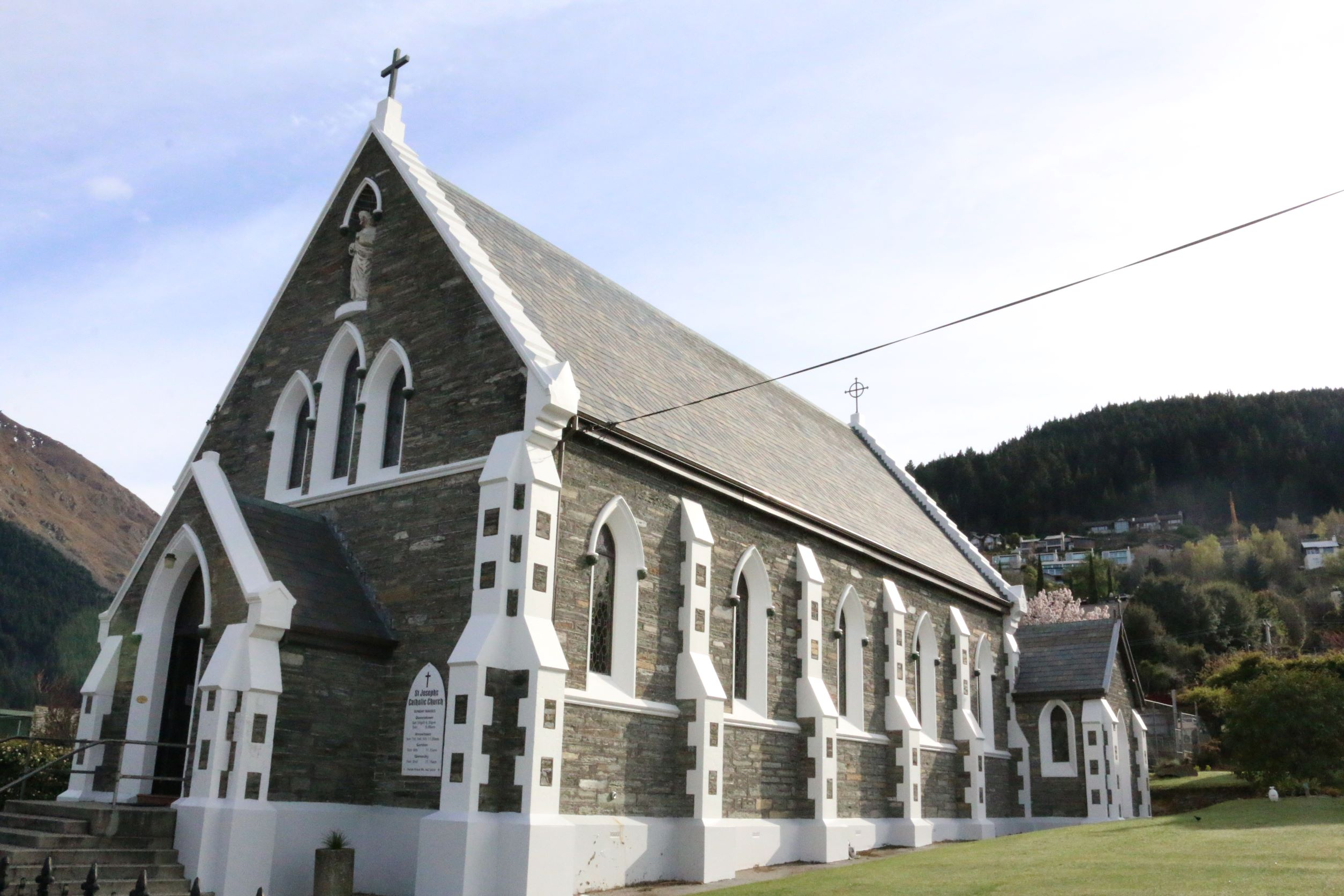
Saint Joseph's Catholic Church

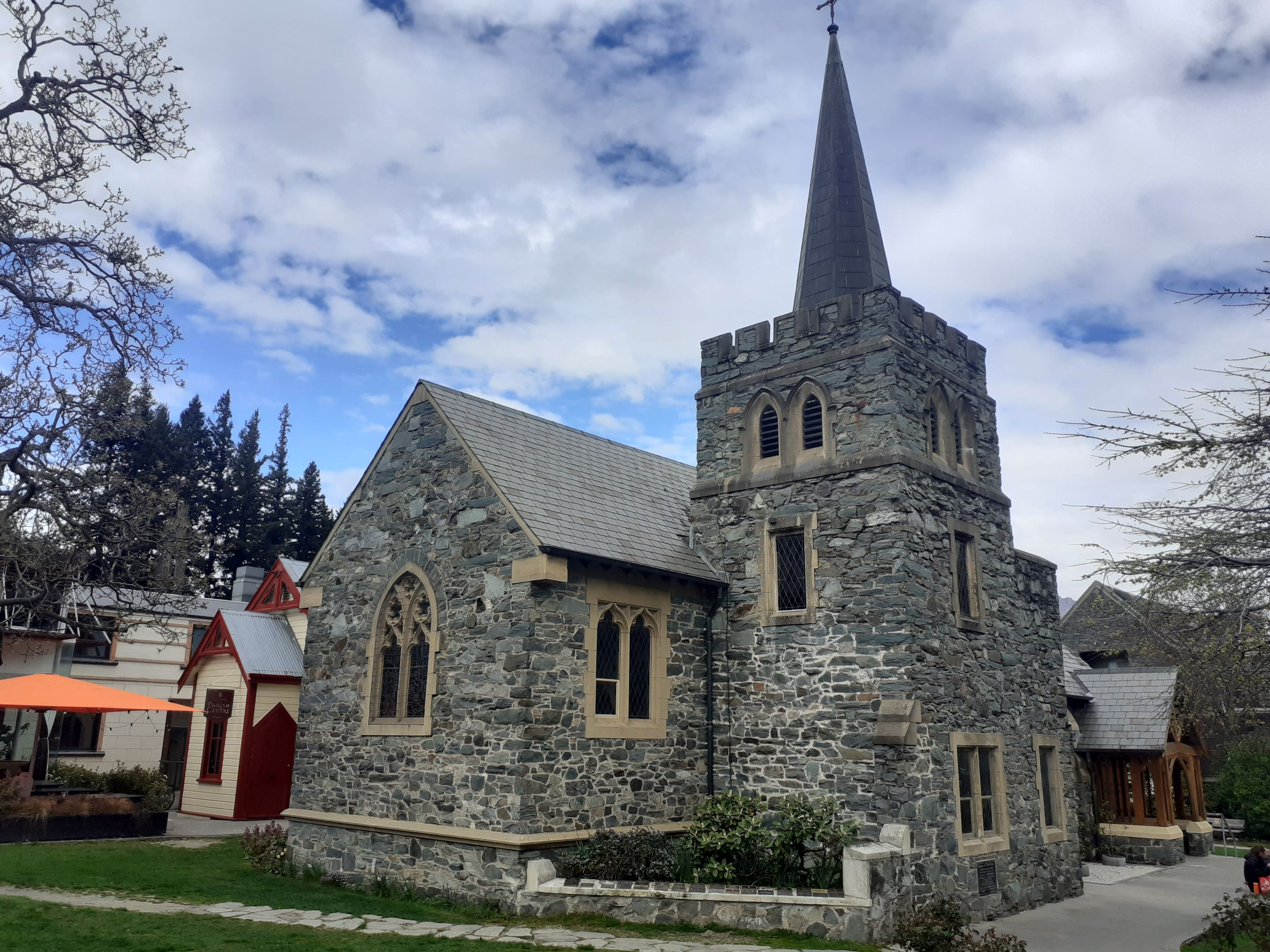
Saint Peter's Anglican Church

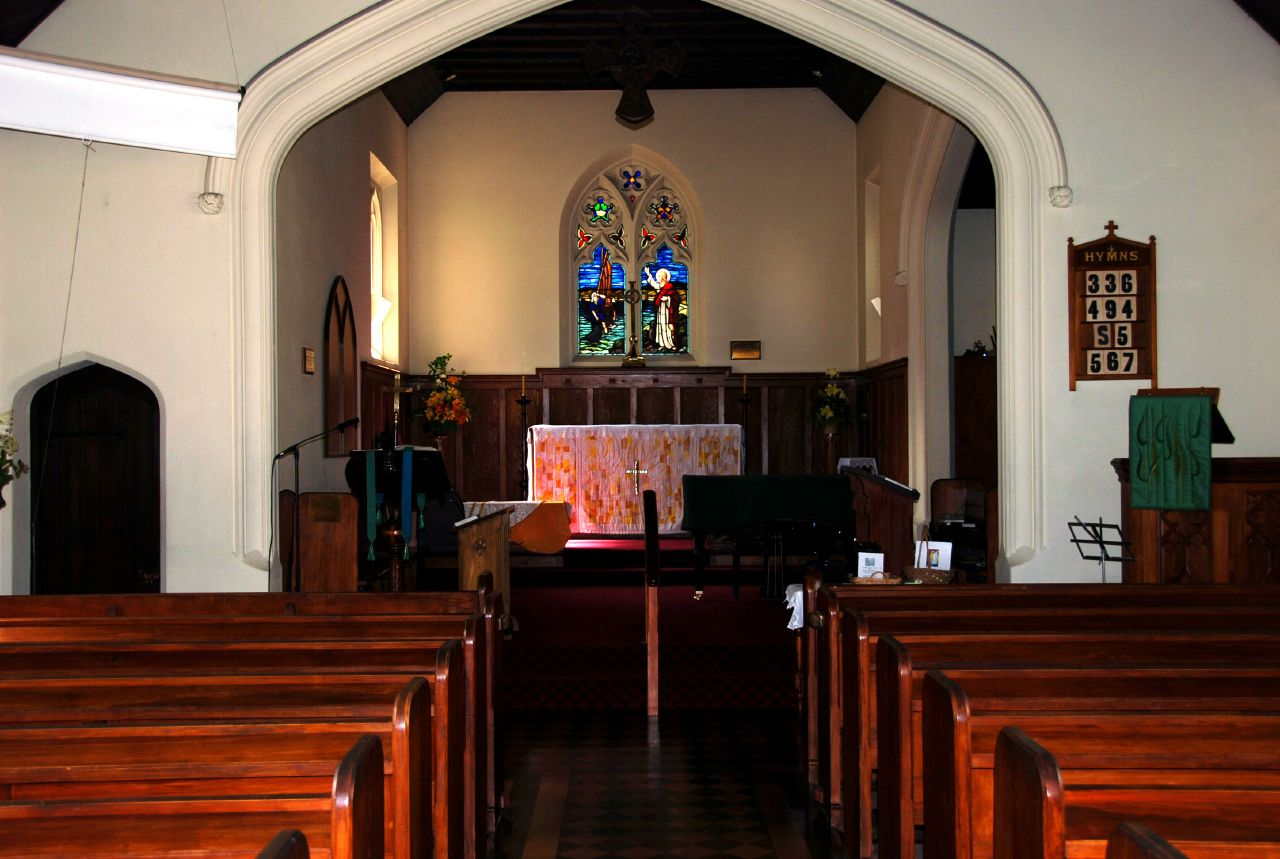
Interior of Saint Peter's Anglican Church

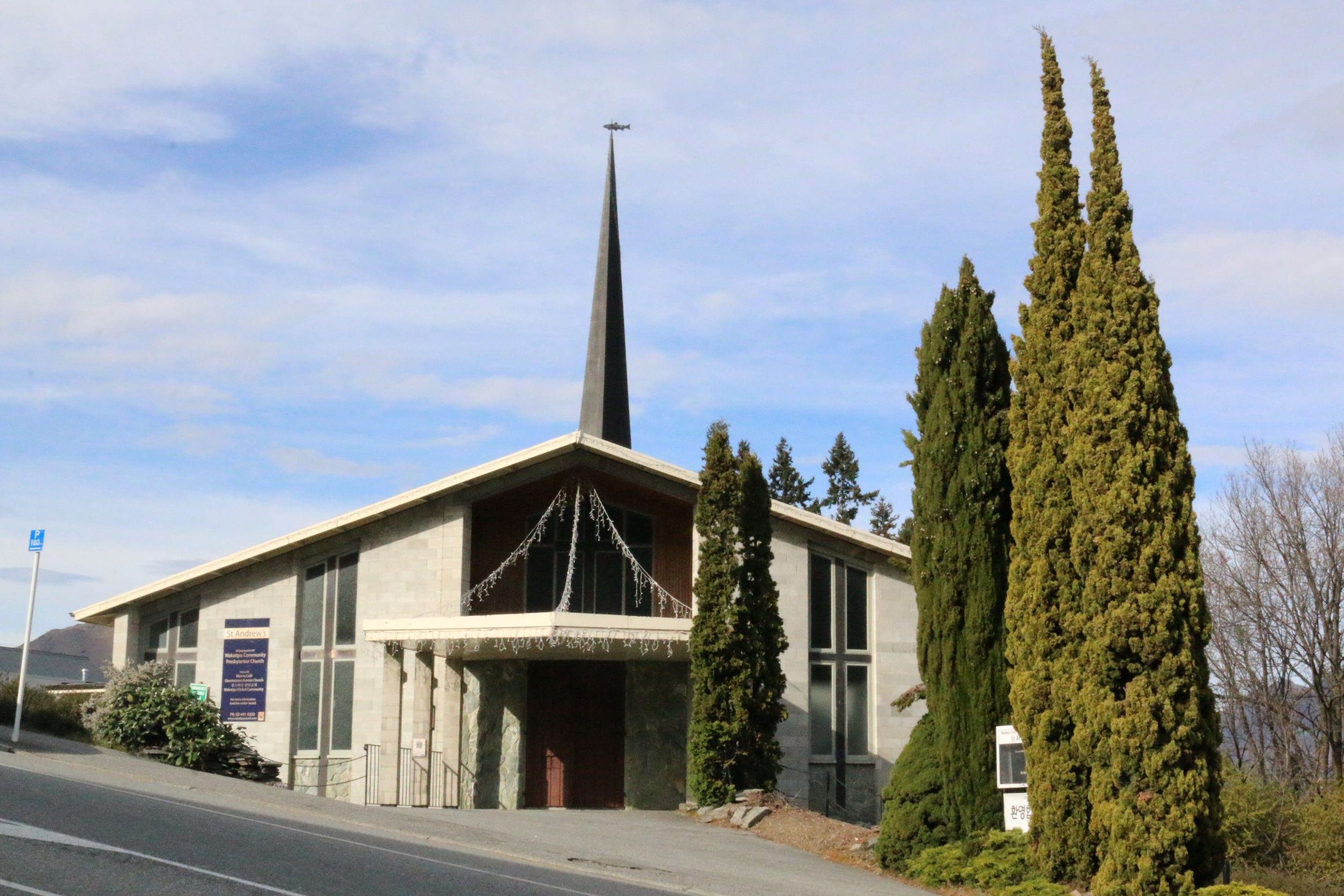
Saint Andrew's Presbyterian Church

== Transport ==
Queenstown is accessible by road and air but not rail (like Kaitaia, Taupō and Nelson).

The primary road access to the Queenstown area is via State Highway 6 (SH6), from Cromwell through the Kawarau Gorge to Frankton, where a 9 km spur (SH6A) leads to the CBD and connects with the Glenorchy Road. SH6 continues south, crossing the Kawarau river before heading down Lake Wakatipu's eastern side to Kingston before crossing the provincial boundary and emerging on the plains of Southland, terminating in Invercargill. A difficult road over the Crown Range leads to Cardrona skifield and Wānaka, and is New Zealand's highest paved public road pass.

Queenstown Airport takes flights from Australia by Air New Zealand, Qantas, Virgin Australia and Jetstar and has destinations that include Brisbane, Gold Coast, Melbourne and Sydney (the frequency is much increased over the ski season and during summer). Domestic flights fly to Auckland, Christchurch and Wellington. Queenstown Airport is New Zealand's busiest helicopter base and the fourth-busiest airport by passenger traffic. It is also heavily used for tourist 'flightseeing', especially to Milford Sound / Piopiotahi and Aoraki / Mount Cook, using both fixed-wing and rotary-wing aircraft.

Many bus services (mainly for package tours) operate to destinations like the Milford Sound, which entails a return trip of approximately 12 hours. Scenic flights are available to and from Milford Sound. A return flight, including a two-hour cruise, takes about four hours.

=== Public transport ===
Public bus services are operated under the Orbus branding by the Otago Regional Council, Go Bus Transport, and Ritchies Transport. A ferry service from the Kelvin Heights suburb to central Queenstown is also operated by Orbus. Bee Cards replaced GoCards on local buses on 15 September 2020. Bee Cards are planned to be phased out in favour of Motu Move in early 2026.

Long distance daily services to and from Invercargill, Dunedin, and Christchurch are also operated by InterCity, Ritches also operate daily services around Otago.

As of 2025 Southern Infrastructure and Doppelmayr are developing plans for a gondola service to connect Downtown Queenstown and Frankton/Queenstown Airport. The first stage of the project could open in late 2028. Another company, Whoosh has also proposed its own service (in partnership with Alistair Porter) for the Remarkables Park.

== Utilities ==
In September 2023, there was an outbreak of illness caused by cryptosporidium in Queenstown, with most cases in the central business area and affecting people under 40. Health officials could not immediately link the cases or identify the source of the outbreak, and called the outbreak very unusual. A "boil water" notice was issued for all water supplies across Queenstown. The regulator Taumata Arowai issued a compliance order to the Queenstown Lakes District Council for one of its water treatment plants because it did not have a protozoa barrier to prevent cryptosporidium entering the water supply.

Electricity distribution in Queenstown is the responsibility of two companies, Dunedin-based Aurora Energy and Invercargill-based Powernet. Electricity is supplied from Transpower's national grid at its substation in Frankton, which in turn is fed by a twin-circuit 110,000-volt line from Transpower's Cromwell substation.

Queenstown was one New Zealand's last towns to rely on a manual telephone exchange, requiring all calls to be connected by an operator. By the early 1980s, the outdated system was overloaded, causing frequent delays—sometimes over an hour for toll calls—frustrating locals and businesses, particularly in the tourism sector. Despite long-standing promises of an upgrade, progress was slow, prompting growing concerns and calls for urgent action. Temporary measures, such as additional switchboards and staff, provided limited relief. After years of setbacks, Queenstown’s long-awaited automatic exchange finally opened in 1986. Fibre to the premises was rolled out in Queenstown as part of the Fifth National Government's Ultra-Fast Broadband programme, with the rollout completed in July 2016.

== Notable people ==
- Sam Neill (1947–2026), actor, has a home in Queenstown
- Tim Bevan (born 1957), film producer, was born in Queenstown
- Jaime Passier-Armstrong (born 1981), actress, was born in Queenstown
- Jane Taylor, lawyer and current Chair of New Zealand Post, lives in Queenstown
- Kim Dotcom, internet entrepreneur

== Sister cities ==
- Aspen, Colorado, United States
- Hangzhou, Zhejiang
- Hikimi, Shimane (now a part of Masuda), Japan
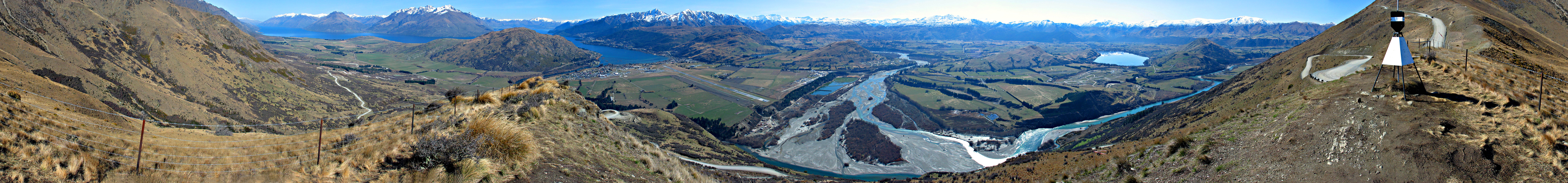
Panorama of the view from the Remarkables towards Queenstown Airport, with Queenstown beyond

== See also ==
- Tourism in New Zealand

== Bibliography ==
- Reed, A. W. (2002). The Reed Dictionary of New Zealand Place Names. Auckland, New Zealand: Reed Books. ISBN 0-7900-0761-4.
