= Queenstown East =

- Suburb
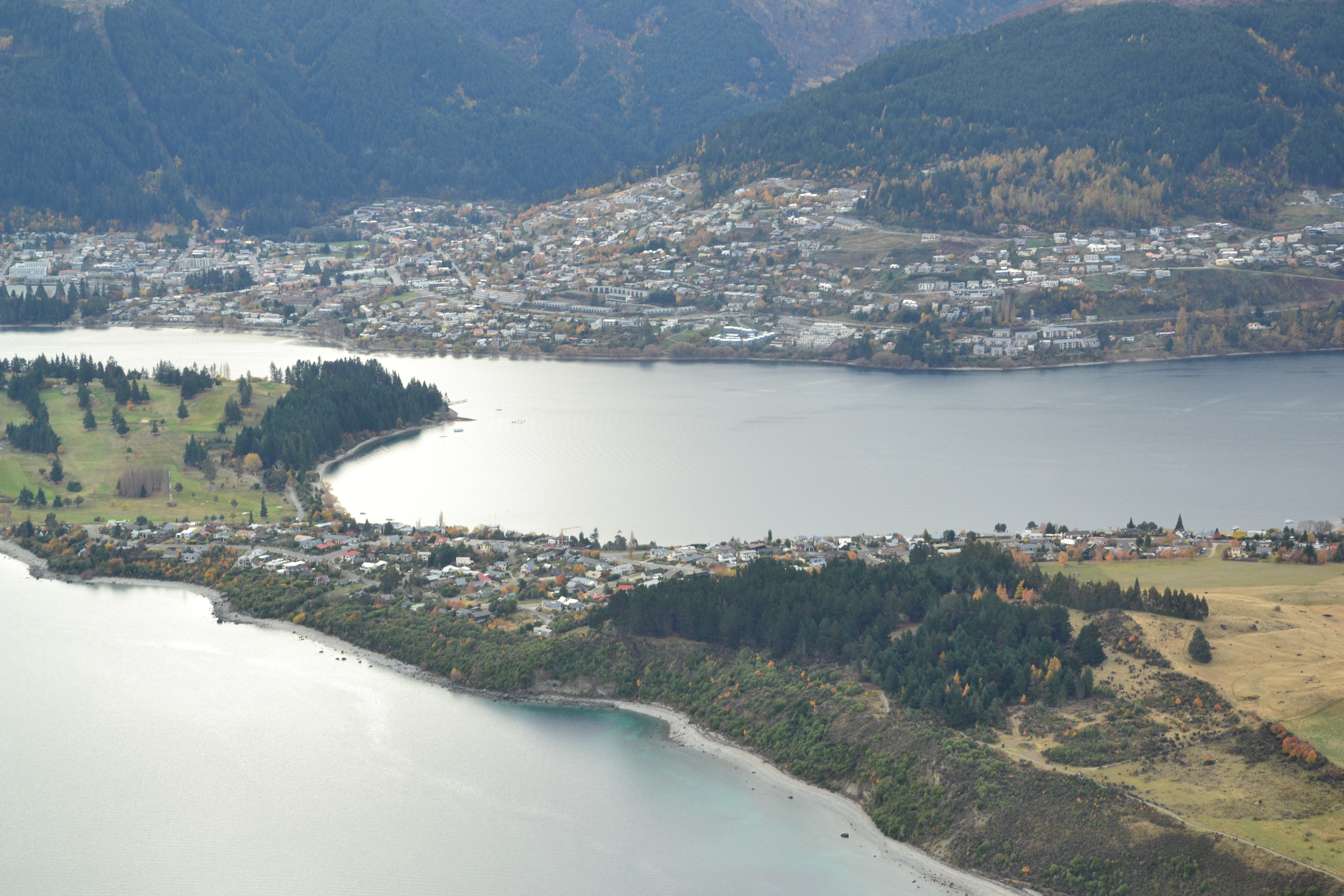
- Queenstown East viewed from Kelvin Heights
- Interactive map of Queenstown East
- Coordinates: 45.034°S 168.669°E
- Country: New Zealand
- City: Queenstown
- Local authority: Queenstown-Lakes District Council
- Electoral ward: Queenstown-Wakatipu Ward

Area
  - Land: 221 ha (550 acres)

Population (June 2025)
  - Total: 3,120
  - Density: 1,410/km^{2} (3,660/sq mi)

	Queenstown Hill	Frankton
Queenstown Central	Queenstown East
(Lake Wakatipu)		(Frankton Arm)

Queenstown East is a residential suburb of Queenstown in the South Island of New Zealand. State Highway 6A runs through it.

Queenstown Gardens is a botanical garden in the southwest part of the suburb.

== Demographics ==
Queenstown East covers 2.21 km^{2} (0.85 sq mi) and had an estimated population of 3,120 as of June 2025, with a population density of 1,412 people per km^{2}.

Historical population
Year	Pop.	±% p.a.
2006	2,499	—
2013	2,931	+2.30%
2018	3,333	+2.60%

Before the 2023 census, Queenstown East had a smaller boundary, covering 2.18 km^{2} (0.84 sq mi). Using that boundary, Queenstown East had a population of 3,333 at the 2018 New Zealand census, an increase of 402 people (13.7%) since the 2013 census, and an increase of 834 people (33.4%) since the 2006 census. There were 1,044 households, comprising 1,761 males and 1,572 females, giving a sex ratio of 1.12 males per female, with 231 people (6.9%) aged under 15 years, 1,299 (39.0%) aged 15 to 29, 1,560 (46.8%) aged 30 to 64, and 237 (7.1%) aged 65 or older.

Ethnicities were 71.9% European/Pākehā, 4.1% Māori, 0.8% Pasifika, 19.0% Asian, and 9.5% other ethnicities. People may identify with more than one ethnicity.

The percentage of people born overseas was 63.2, compared with 27.1% nationally.

Although some people chose not to answer the census's question about religious affiliation, 59.3% had no religion, 26.9% were Christian, 0.1% had Māori religious beliefs, 3.0% were Hindu, 0.6% were Muslim, 2.8% were Buddhist and 3.3% had other religions.

Of those at least 15 years old, 867 (27.9%) people had a bachelor's or higher degree, and 183 (5.9%) people had no formal qualifications. 447 people (14.4%) earned over $70,000 compared to 17.2% nationally. The employment status of those at least 15 was that 2,424 (78.1%) people were employed full-time, 288 (9.3%) were part-time, and 36 (1.2%) were unemployed.

Individual statistical areas
Name	Area (km^{2})	Population	Density (per km^{2})	Households	Median age	Median income
Queenstown East	0.98	1,416	1,445	441	30.5 years	$38,800
Frankton Arm	1.20	1,917	1,598	603	31.2 years	$41,200
New Zealand					37.4 years	$31,800
