= Sunshine Bay =

- Suburb
- Interactive map of Sunshine Bay
- Coordinates: 45.0441414°S 168.6227571°E
- Country: New Zealand
- City: Queenstown
- Local authority: Queenstown-Lakes District Council
- Electoral ward: Queenstown-Wakatipu Ward

Area
  - Land: 1,322 ha (3,270 acres)

Population (June 2025)
  - Total: 3,440
  - Density: 260/km^{2} (674/sq mi)

	(Ben Lomond)	Fernhill
	Sunshine Bay
Closeburn		(Lake Wakatipu)

Sunshine Bay is an inlet of Lake Wakatipu and suburb of Queenstown in the South Island of New Zealand. It is located on the lower slopes of the Ben Lomond mountain, west of Fernhill, on the northern side of the lake.

It is only accessible by a single road from the main Queenstown township, which was completely blocked off by a single car crash in October 2020.

Many homes in the suburb were rented out to tourists or tourism workers, until the COVID-19 pandemic led to an end to international tourism. Patronage on the public bus service between Arrowtown and Sunshine Bay, which was popular with tourists, also dropped off during the pandemic.

In August 2020, a developer sought permission from Otago Regional Council to rezone five hectares of land to develop 200 new residential units at Sunshine Bay.

Later that same month, several on-street carparks were removed from Arawata Terrace, after a bus became stuck due to cars parked on both sides.

In December 2020, a ban on drinking on Queenstown Beach led to more public drinking at the Sunshine Bay beach.

== Demographics ==
Sunshine Bay-Fernhill covers 13.22 km^{2} (5.10 sq mi) and had an estimated population of 3,440 as of June 2025, with a population density of 260 people per km^{2}.

Historical population
Year	Pop.	±% p.a.
2006	2,256	—
2013	2,358	+0.63%
2018	2,931	+4.45%

Before the 2023 census, Sunshine Bay-Fernhill had a smaller boundary, covering 1.31 km^{2} (0.51 sq mi). Using that boundary, Sunshine Bay-Fernhill had a population of 2,931 at the 2018 New Zealand census, an increase of 573 people (24.3%) since the 2013 census, and an increase of 675 people (29.9%) since the 2006 census. There were 861 households, comprising 1,566 males and 1,365 females, giving a sex ratio of 1.15 males per female. The median age was 29.6 years (compared with 37.4 years nationally), with 294 people (10.0%) aged under 15 years, 1,221 (41.7%) aged 15 to 29, 1,332 (45.4%) aged 30 to 64, and 84 (2.9%) aged 65 or older.

Ethnicities were 72.6% European/Pākehā, 5.6% Māori, 1.1% Pasifika, 16.0% Asian, and 10.5% other ethnicities. People may identify with more than one ethnicity.

The percentage of people born overseas was 62.8, compared with 27.1% nationally.

Although some people chose not to answer the census's question about religious affiliation, 64.5% had no religion, 23.6% were Christian, 0.2% had Māori religious beliefs, 2.9% were Hindu, 0.8% were Muslim, 0.8% were Buddhist and 3.4% had other religions.

Of those at least 15 years old, 681 (25.8%) people had a bachelor's or higher degree, and 120 (4.6%) people had no formal qualifications. The median income was $37,600, compared with $31,800 nationally. 246 people (9.3%) earned over $70,000 compared to 17.2% nationally. The employment status of those at least 15 was that 2,094 (79.4%) people were employed full-time, 240 (9.1%) were part-time, and 48 (1.8%) were unemployed.
