= Queenstown Events Centre =

Sports complex

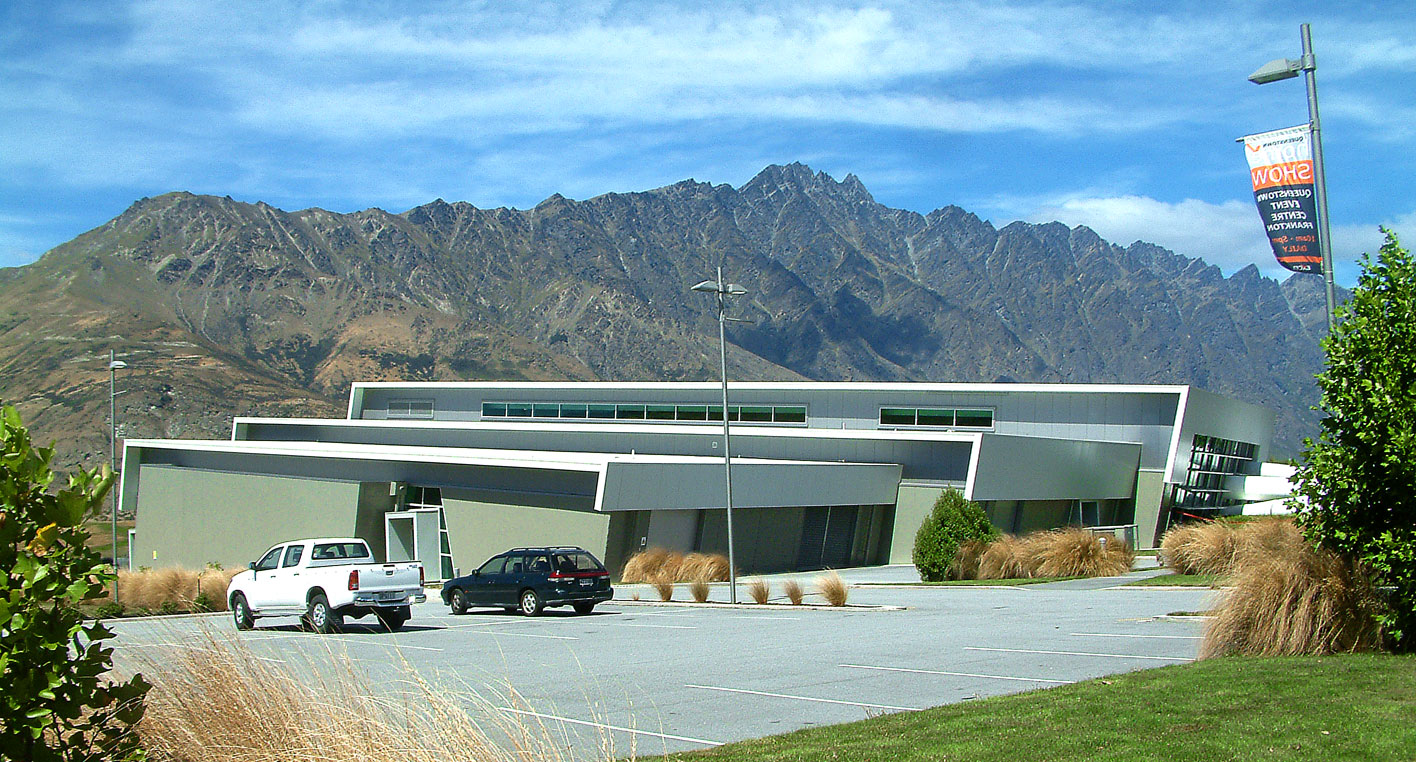
- View of the Queenstown Events Centre Building
- Interactive map of Queenstown Events Centre
- Former names: John Davies Oval, Davies Park
- Location: Joe O'Connell Drive, Frankton, Queenstown, New Zealand
- Coordinates: 45°0′58″S 168°44′18″E
- Owner: Queenstown-Lakes District Council
- Operator: Lakes Leisure
- Capacity: 19,000
- Surface: Grass
- Main venue: Queenstown Events Centre Building
- Facilities: Alpine Aqualand, Frankton Golf Centre, Rockatipu Climbing Wall
- Public transit: Frankton Bus Interchange

Construction
- Opened: 1997

Tenants
- Otago Rugby Football Union, Highlanders, Otago United, Otago Volts, Queenstown Cricket Club

Ground information
- End names
- Remarkables End; Coronet Peak End

International information
- First men's ODI: 4 January 2003: New Zealand v India
- Last men's ODI: 1 January 2014: New Zealand v West Indies
- Only men's T20I: 8 April 2023: New Zealand v Sri Lanka
- First women's ODI: 3 March 2010: New Zealand v Australia
- Last women's ODI: 12 December 2023: New Zealand v Pakistan
- First women's T20I: 9 February 2022: New Zealand v India
- Last women's T20I: 9 December 2023: New Zealand v Pakistan
- As of 12 December 2023; Source: ESPNcricinfo

Queenstown Events Centre, John Davies Oval, or Davies Park is a multi-purpose sports complex and stadium in Queenstown, Otago, in the South Island of New Zealand.

== History ==
Opened in 1997, the venue is on Queenstown Lakes District Council–owned land and is a multi-purpose indoor and outdoor venue. The stadium has a capacity of 19,000 spectators with 6,000 permanent seating.

The ground is located between the foot of the Remarkables and the shores of Lake Wakatipu with Queenstown International Airport nearby. The venue hosts regular international cricket matches, Highlanders rugby games, trade shows, exhibitions, seminars and concerts. It is also used by Otago Cricket for List A fixtures.

== Activities ==
The Queenstown Events Centre offers many activities, including cricket, rugby, swimming, golf, fitness training, tennis (indoor and outdoor), netball (indoor and outdoor), and indoor rock climbing. The centre is also home to several sport clubs.

=== Cricket ===
A range of formats of cricket are played at the centre including One Day Internationals, local Twenty20 competitions, school cricket, and six-a-side competitions. There are practice nets near the entrance of the centre.

On 1 January 2014, at the Queenstown Events Centre, New Zealand Black Caps' Corey Anderson broke Shahid Afridi's 17-year-old record of the fastest One Day International (ODI) hundred by one ball, scoring his in 36 balls. He ended with an unbeaten 131 that featured 14 sixes and 6 fours. Along with Jesse Ryder, he helped New Zealand set the team record for the most sixes in an ODI innings.

=== Alpine Aqualand ===
The Alpine Aqualand is an indoor water park at the north of the Queenstown Events Centre stadium. The building has a 25-metre lap pool with 8 lanes, a leisure pool and lazy river, two hydroslides, a toddler pool, learners pools, and hot tubs.

=== Frankton Golf Centre ===
The Frankton Golf Centre is a 9-hole golf course at the south of the Queenstown Events Centre. The course has a par of 30 with 6 par 3s ranging from 73 metres to 185 metres and 3 par 4s ranging from 280 metres to 310 metres. The current record for the course is 26. The course also has a driving range, a footgolf course, and a pro shop.

=== Rockatipu Climbing Wall ===
The Rockatipu Climbing Wall is an indoor rock climbing wall at the Queenstown Events Centre. It offers over 40 climbs, vertical and overhanging rock features, classes, kids' climbing courses, and equipment hire.

== International centuries ==
Two One Day International centuries have been scored on the ground. Corey Anderson scored a century in 36 balls in 2014, setting a new record for the fastest century in an ODI.

No.	Score	Player	Team	Opposing team	Date	Result
1	104	Jesse Ryder	New Zealand	West Indies	1 January 2014	New Zealand won
2	131 not out	Corey Anderson	New Zealand	West Indies	1 January 2014	New Zealand won

== International five-wicket hauls ==
Two bowlers have taken five-wicket hauls in international cricket on the ground, both in One Day Internationals.

No.	Bowler	Date	Team	Opposing team	Overs	Figures	Result
1	Andre Adams	4 January 2003	New Zealand	India	10	5/22	New Zealand won
2	Daniel Vettori	27 January 2007	New Zealand	Bangladesh	6	5/7	New Zealand won
