= Frankton, Otago =

Frankton
- Suburb
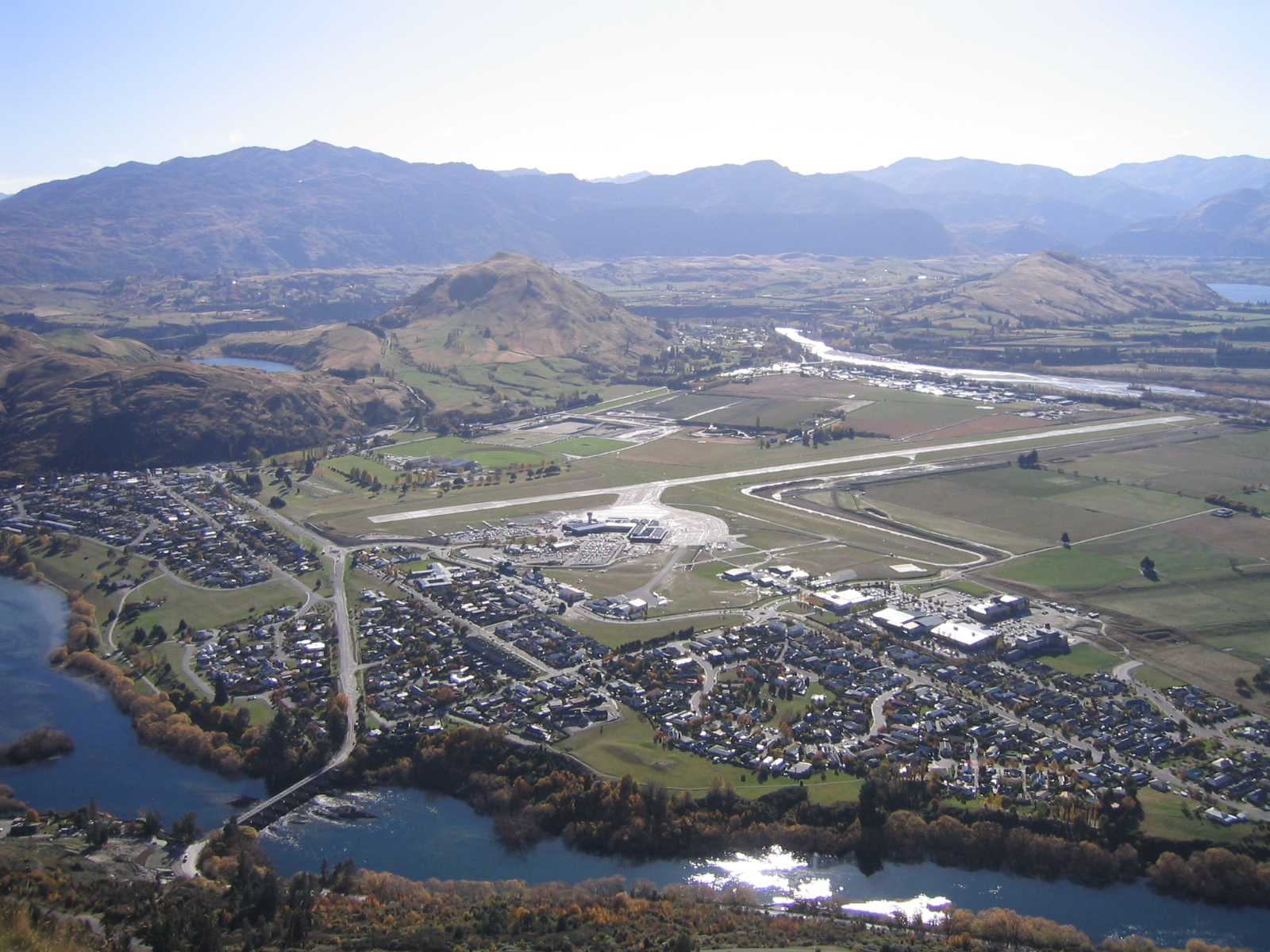
- The view from Peninsula Hill
- Interactive map of Frankton
- Coordinates: 45°1′S 168°44′E
- Country: New Zealand
- City: Queenstown
- Local authority: Queenstown-Lakes District Council
- Electoral ward: Queenstown-Wakatipu Ward

Area
  - Land: 756 ha (1,870 acres)

Population (June 2025)
  - Total: 3,990
  - Density: 528/km^{2} (1,370/sq mi)
- Airports: Queenstown Airport

Queenstown Hill	Quail Rise	Shotover Country
Queenstown East	Frankton	Gibbston
(Frankton Arm)	Kelvin Peninsula	(The Remarkables)

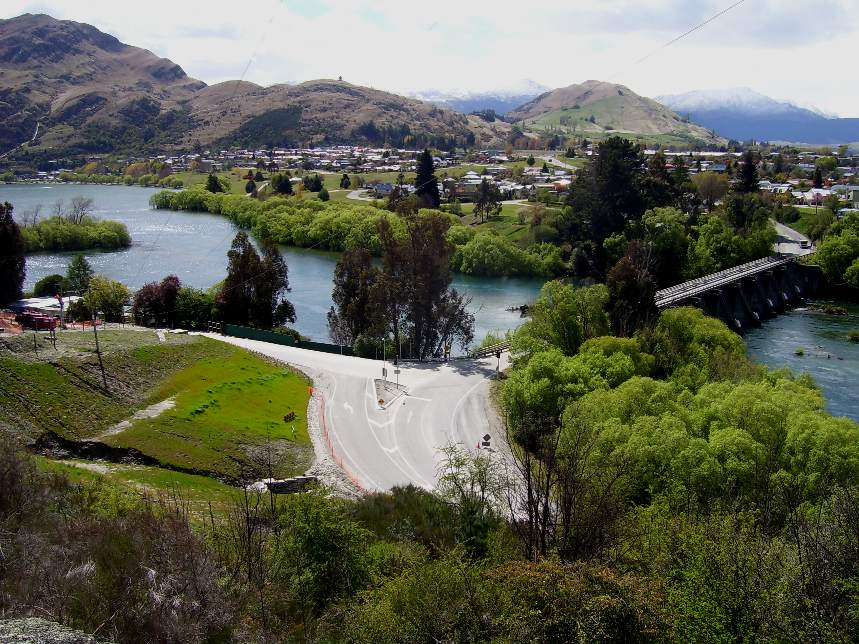
The view across Kawarau River

Frankton is a suburb of the town of Queenstown in the South Island of New Zealand, it was formerly a separate settlement.

== History ==
Frankton was named after Frances—the wife of the area's first European settler William Gilbert Rees. He started farming at Queenstown in 1860, and Frankton was established in 1863.

The Otago Witness of 14 February 1863 remarked that 'with all its natural advantages nothing can prevent Frankton being the chief township of the district'. The government moved all its buildings including the warden's Court and the gold receiver to Frankton. With no road between Queenstown and Frankton this created all sorts of inconveniences. The police at Queenstown Police Station travelled daily to the Court at Frankton. After a banquet in June 1863, hosting the secretary of the goldfields, and the police commissioner St. John Branigan, the decision was reversed.

This historic Kawerau Falls Bridge was built between 22 December 1924 and August 1926. It was constructed as a dam to lower the water level in the Kawarau River to enable the river bed to be mined. This idea may have been first suggested by Julius Vogel eighth Premier of New Zealand and Otago goldfields journalist in his 1889 book Anno Domini 2000 – A Woman's Destiny. The dam gates were shut from 15 June to 15 August. This caused the water to back up from behind the bridge to the Shotover River confluence. Less gold was found than expected and the project was largely unsuccessful. In May 1932, during the Depression, the gates were shut again for six weeks for unemployed men to fossick for gold.

== Location ==
Frankton is located at the end of a large inlet in the northeastern shore of Lake Wakatipu known as the Frankton Arm, on State Highway 6. It is one terminus of the short State Highway 6A, which runs seven kilometres west from there to Queenstown.

Frankton is located on the edge of a larger area referred to as the Frankton Flats, which is the area of land approximately bounded by Lake Wakatipu, the Kawarau and Shotover Rivers, and State Highway 6 to towards Cromwell. The Frankton Flats is located in the Wakatipu Basin and enjoys longer sunshine hours, particularly in winter, than the majority of land in central Queenstown, which is predominantly south facing.

== Demographics ==
Frankton covers 7.56 km^{2} (2.92 sq mi) and had an estimated population of 3,990 as of June 2025, with a population density of 528 people per km^{2}.

Historical population
Year	Pop.	±% p.a.
2006	2,154	—
2013	2,307	+0.99%
2018	2,895	+4.65%

Frankton had a population of 2,895 at the 2018 New Zealand census, an increase of 588 people (25.5%) since the 2013 census, and an increase of 741 people (34.4%) since the 2006 census. There were 1,017 households, comprising 1,521 males and 1,377 females, giving a sex ratio of 1.1 males per female. The median age was 32.8 years (compared with 37.4 years nationally), with 339 people (11.7%) aged under 15 years, 861 (29.7%) aged 15 to 29, 1,398 (48.3%) aged 30 to 64, and 297 (10.3%) aged 65 or older.

Ethnicities were 67.5% European/Pākehā, 4.7% Māori, 2.1% Pasifika, 20.1% Asian, and 11.2% other ethnicities. People may identify with more than one ethnicity.

The percentage of people born overseas was 49.7, compared with 27.1% nationally.

Although some people chose not to answer the census's question about religious affiliation, 52.1% had no religion, 32.8% were Christian, 0.2% had Māori religious beliefs, 4.6% were Hindu, 1.1% were Muslim, 1.5% were Buddhist and 3.0% had other religions.

Of those at least 15 years old, 669 (26.2%) people had a bachelor's or higher degree, and 219 (8.6%) people had no formal qualifications. The median income was $39,300, compared with $31,800 nationally. 390 people (15.3%) earned over $70,000 compared to 17.2% nationally. The employment status of those at least 15 was that 1,788 (70.0%) people were employed full-time, 321 (12.6%) were part-time, and 24 (0.9%) were unemployed.

== Economy ==
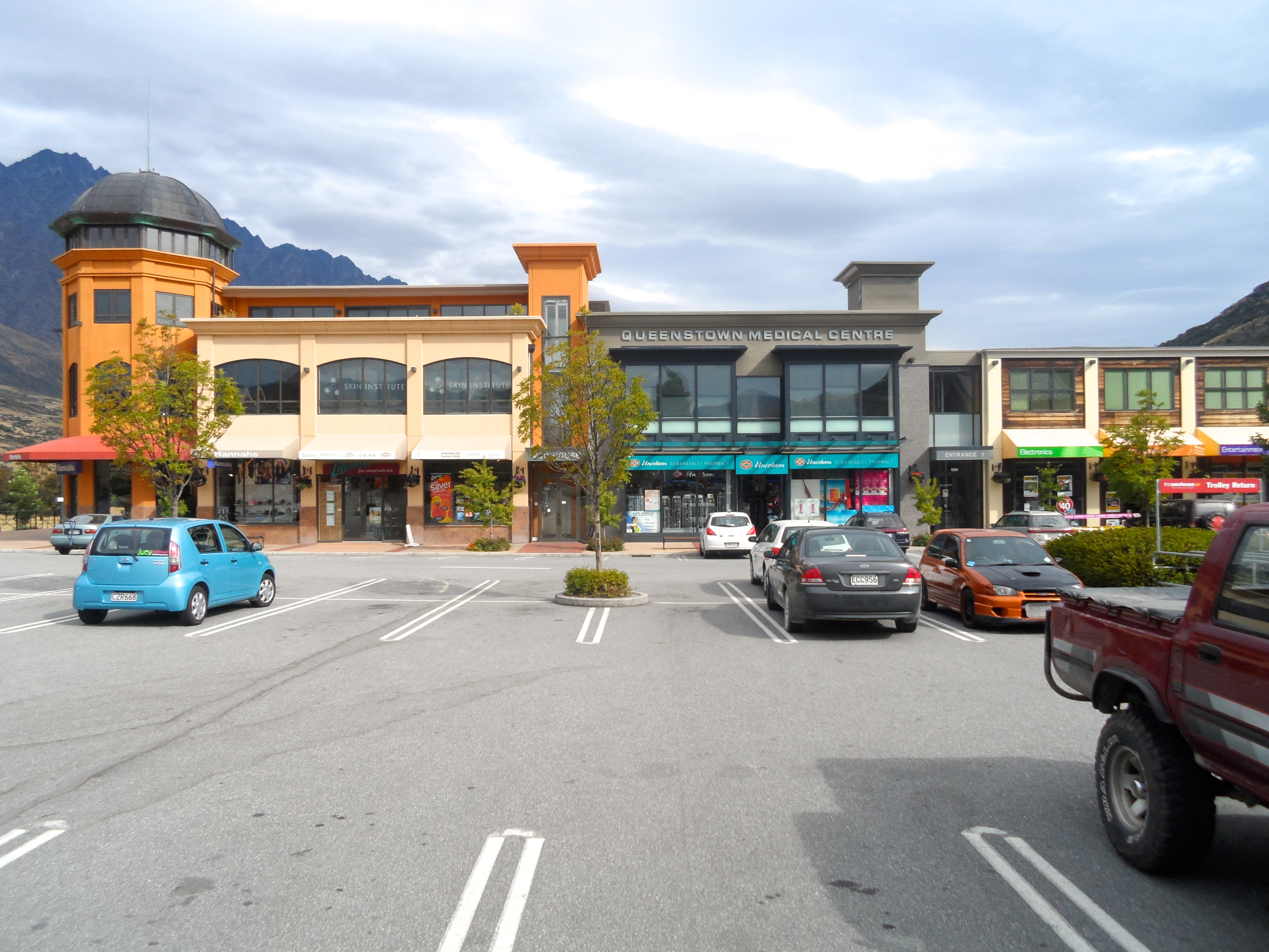
Remarkables Park Town Centre, Frankton

=== Queenstown Airport ===
Queenstown Airport is located at Frankton. The airport provides direct international flights to Australia, and domestic flights around New Zealand.

=== Remarkables Park Town Centre ===
Remarkables Park Town Centre houses 60 retailers, including H & J Smith, Harvey Norman and New World, and has over 800 parking spaces.

=== Queenstown Central Shopping Centre ===
Queenstown Central Shopping Centre opened in 2016, and covers an area of more than 4,000 m². It features 250 carparks and 45 shops, including Kmart.

=== Queenstown Events Centre ===
The Queenstown Events Centre is also located in Frankton and contains the main recreational and sporting facilities for Queenstown residents. Facilities at the Queenstown Events Centre include Alpine Aqualand (swimming pools and hydro slide), sports fields for football and cricket, cricket nets, indoor courts and events facilities.

== Education ==
Remarkables Primary School is a co-educational state primary school for Year 1 to 8 students, with a roll of 397 as of March 2026.

KingsView School is a co-educational state-integrated Catholic primary school for Year 1 to 8 students, with a roll of 74.

Wakatipu High School is a co-educational state secondary school for Year 9 to 13 students, with a roll of 1,543.
