= Fernhill, Queenstown =

Suburb of Queenstown, New Zealand

Fernhill
- Suburb
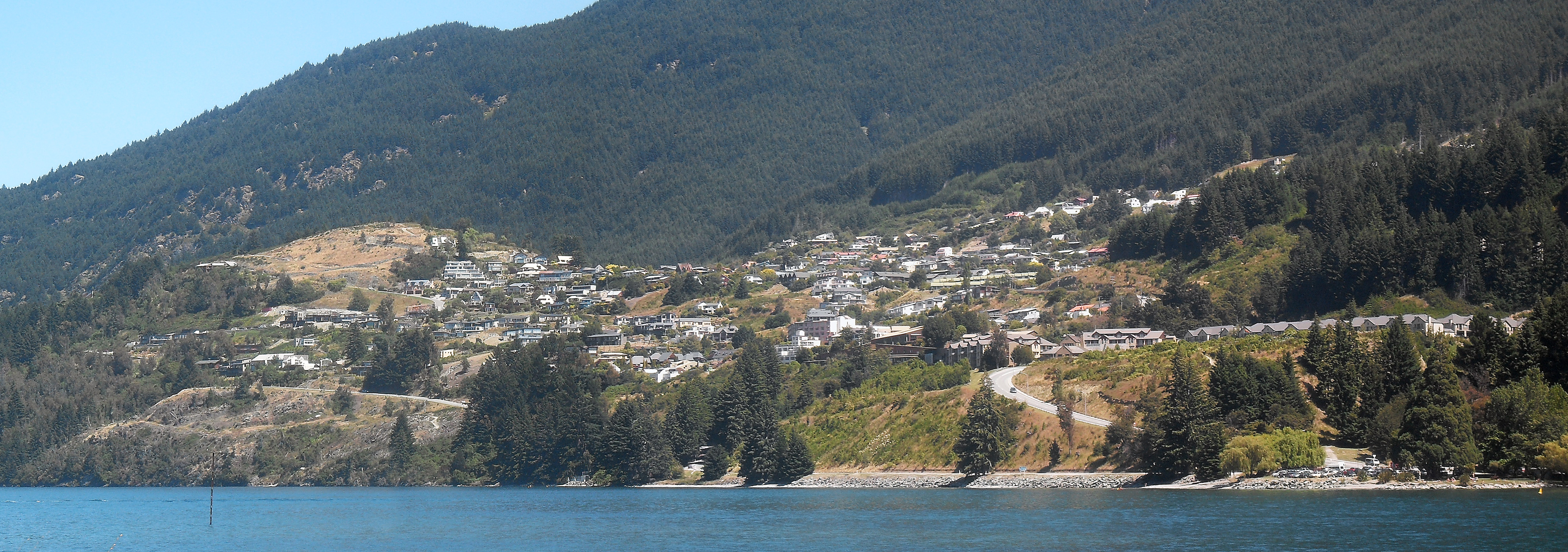
- The suburb of Fernhill as viewed from the Queenstown Gardens
- Interactive map of Fernhill
- Coordinates: 45.0389°S 168.6226°E
- Country: New Zealand
- City: Queenstown

| | Ben Lomond | Queenstown |
| | Fernhill |
| Sunshine Bay | | Lake Wakatipu |

Fernhill is a suburb of Queenstown in the South Island of New Zealand. It is located on the lower slopes of the Ben Lomond mountain, east of Sunshine Bay on the northern side of Lake Wakatipu.

It is only accessible by a single road from the main Queenstown township.

== Demographics ==
Fernhill is part of the Sunshine Bay-Fernhill statistical area.

== Tracks ==
There are a number of walking/biking tracks that can be accessed from around the Fernhill area:

- The Department of Conservation Arawata Terrace Track takes you from Arawata Terrace to the Queenstown-Glenorchy Road.
- The Fernhill Town Link Track which connects Cameron Place in Fernhill with Thompson Street near Queenstown.
- The Fernhill Loop Track in the Ben Lomond Reserve.
- A small track that connects the One Mile Powerhouse carpark area runs near Fernhill Road and ends near the Heritage Hotel.
