= Kelvin Peninsula =

Suburb of the town of Queenstown in the South Island of New Zealand

Kelvin Heights
- Suburb
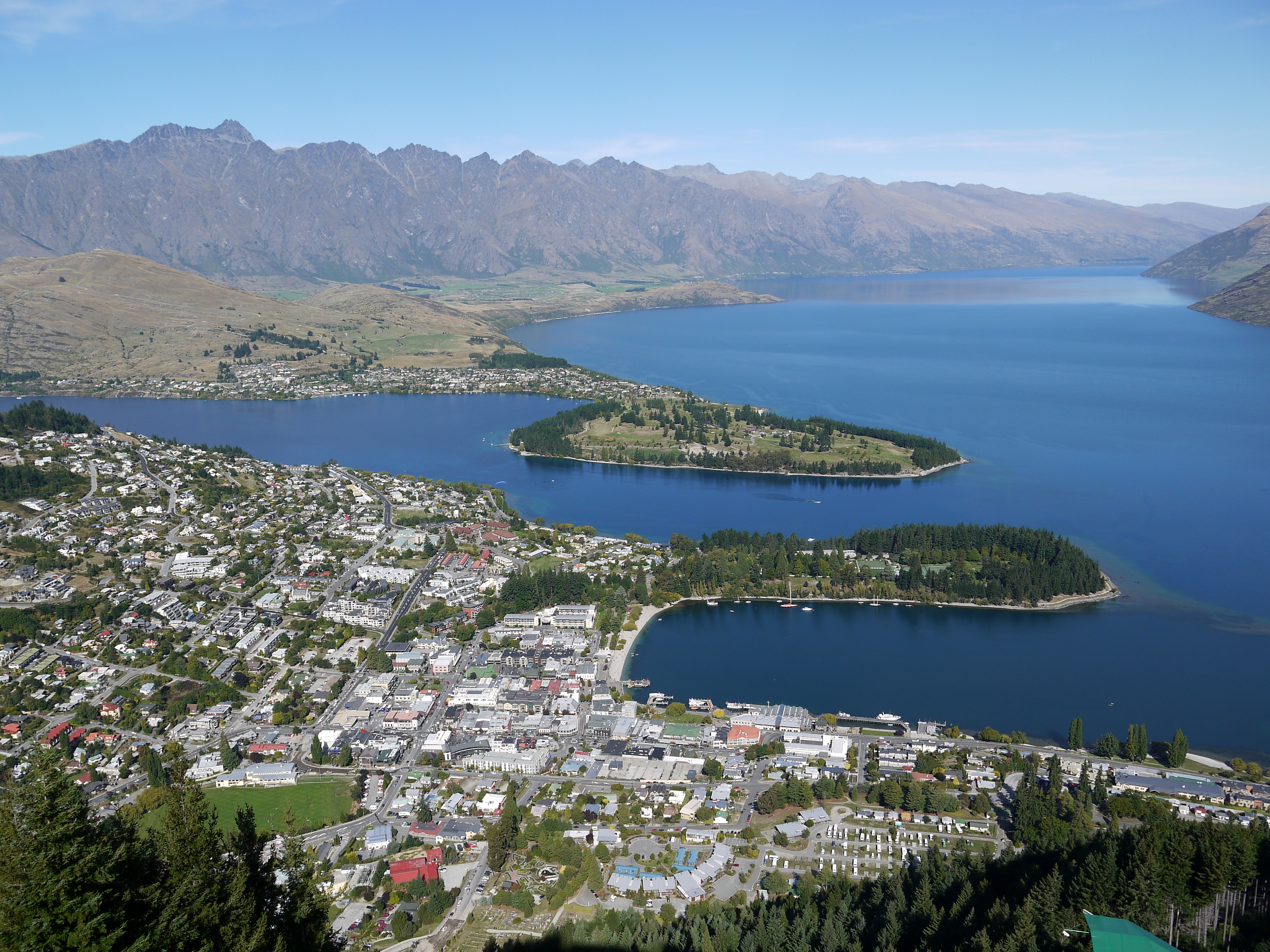
- View over Queenstown, with the Kelvin Peninsula and Kelvin Heights in the centre background
- Interactive map of Kelvin Heights
- Coordinates: 45°2′44″S 168°41′10″E
- Country: New Zealand
- City: Queenstown
- Local authority: Queenstown-Lakes District Council
- Electoral ward: Queenstown-Wakatipu Ward

Area
  - Land: 928 ha (2,290 acres)

Population (June 2025)
  - Total: 1,220
  - Density: 131/km^{2} (340/sq mi)

| (Frankton Arm) | | Frankton |
| | Kelvin Peninsula | (The Remarkables) |
| (Lake Wakatipu) | Kelvin Peninsula | Jack's Point |

Kelvin Peninsula is a peninsula on the shore of Lake Wakatipu in New Zealand's Otago Region. The peninsula lies between the main body of Lake Wakatipu and the lake's Frankton Arm (a short inlet into the lake's northern shore) and its outlet, the Kawarau River. The centre of Queenstown lies on the opposite shore of the Frankton Arm. The peninsula was formerly called Kelvin Heights Peninsula. The name Kelvin Heights is still used for the Queenstown suburb which sits on the peninsula.

== Geography ==
The peninsula has two major parts, a rounded main part to the east, dominated by the 834 metres (2,736 ft) Peninsula Hill, and a smaller western extension largely occupied by Queenstown Golf Club. Peninsula Road skirts the shore of Frankton Arm at the foot of Peninsula Hill to link the peninsula with SH 6 close to Frankton, at the eastern end of the arm.

At one time there was public access to the prominent Deer Park Heights part of Peninsula Hill (which has several former film locations as well as a range of farm animals) from Peninsula Road, but this closed in 2009.

== History ==
The original Ngāi Tahu inhabitants called the peninsula Te Nuku-o-Hakitekura, the Expanse of Hakitekura. Hakitekura is the famous Kāti Māmoe woman who was the first person to swim across the lake. Several other nearby geographical features are named after Hakitekura and this historic event.

European settlers first called it the Kawarau Peninsula, before changing it to Kelvin Peninsula.

== Kelvin Heights ==
The Queenstown suburb of Kelvin Heights sits at the narrow isthmus between the two parts of the peninsula. It is one of the most expensive suburbs in New Zealand in which to buy a house, with the median house value at about NZ$1 million in 2005. Kelvin Heights features part of the Queenstown Trail, which runs between the suburb and the Frankton Arm section of Lake Wakatipu. The suburb is also home to a Christian camp that is over 50 years old.

=== Demographics ===
Kelvin Heights covers 9.28 km^{2} (3.58 sq mi) and had an estimated population of 1,220 as of June 2025, with a population density of 131 people per km^{2}.

Historical population
| Year | Pop. | ±% p.a. |
|---|---|---|
| 2006 | 963 | — |
| 2013 | 1,011 | +0.70% |
| 2018 | 1,170 | +2.96% |

Kelvin Heights had a population of 1,170 at the 2018 New Zealand census, an increase of 159 people (15.7%) since the 2013 census, and an increase of 207 people (21.5%) since the 2006 census. There were 447 households, comprising 588 males and 579 females, giving a sex ratio of 1.02 males per female. The median age was 43.4 years (compared with 37.4 years nationally), with 168 people (14.4%) aged under 15 years, 204 (17.4%) aged 15 to 29, 567 (48.5%) aged 30 to 64, and 228 (19.5%) aged 65 or older.

Ethnicities were 88.2% European/Pākehā, 5.9% Māori, 1.3% Pasifika, 7.2% Asian, and 3.8% other ethnicities. People may identify with more than one ethnicity.

The percentage of people born overseas was 30.5, compared with 27.1% nationally.

Although some people chose not to answer the census's question about religious affiliation, 52.8% had no religion, 39.2% were Christian, 0.5% were Hindu, 1.5% were Buddhist and 2.3% had other religions.

Of those at least 15 years old, 288 (28.7%) people had a bachelor's or higher degree, and 84 (8.4%) people had no formal qualifications. The median income was $44,800, compared with $31,800 nationally. 276 people (27.5%) earned over $70,000 compared to 17.2% nationally. The employment status of those at least 15 was that 567 (56.6%) people were employed full-time, 141 (14.1%) were part-time, and 9 (0.9%) were unemployed.
