= Queenstown Hill =

Mountain in New Zealand

- Te Tapu-nui
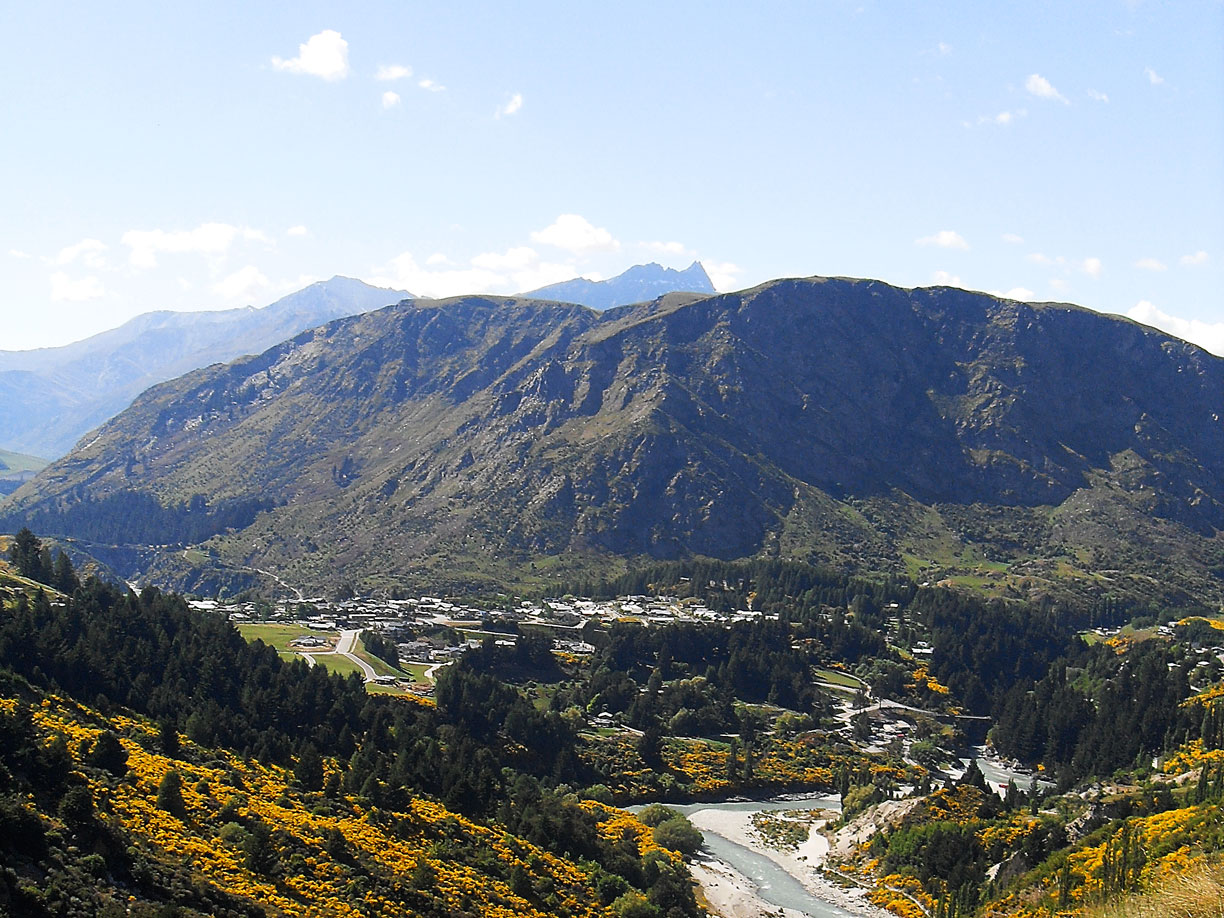
- "Queenstown Hill" viewed from Moonlight Track

Highest point
- Elevation: 907 m (2,976 ft)
- Coordinates: 45°0′30″S 168°41′34″E

Geography
- Location within New Zealand
- Location: South Island, New Zealand

Queenstown Hill, also known by its Māori name of Te Tapu-nui (mountain of intense sacredness), is a small 907 metres (2,976 ft) mountain near Queenstown, New Zealand in the South Island.

The lower levels of the hill contain housing especially near Queenstown, Frankton Road and Marina Heights. Midway up the hill is a forest of mainly wilding conifers including douglas fir and larch, while the top is largely clear and the ground cover is that of tussock and native vegetation.

Queenstown Hill is also home to a farm consisting of 1800 sheep which is owned and operated by the Middletons who purchased the lease in 1963 and freeholded the land in 1978. The uppermost section of the Time Walk crosses private land.

== Queenstown Hill Time Walk ==
The Time Walk is a walk on Queenstown Hill. The entrance to the trail is on Belfast Terrace. At the start of the walk is a wrought iron gate which shows symbols of the local area. There are many panels along the walk describing the history of the area. The walk takes about three hours return, but can be shortened by not walking the full loop. Unusually for a trail in this area, neither dogs or bicycles are allowed on the track.

== Basket of Dreams ==
Not far from the top is a sculpture called the Basket of Dreams by Caroline Robinson. There are expansive views from this point of the whole basin including Lake Wakatipu, Cecil Peak and The Remarkables.
