= Closeburn, New Zealand =

Locality in Queenstown Lakes District, Otago, New Zealand

Closeburn
- Locality
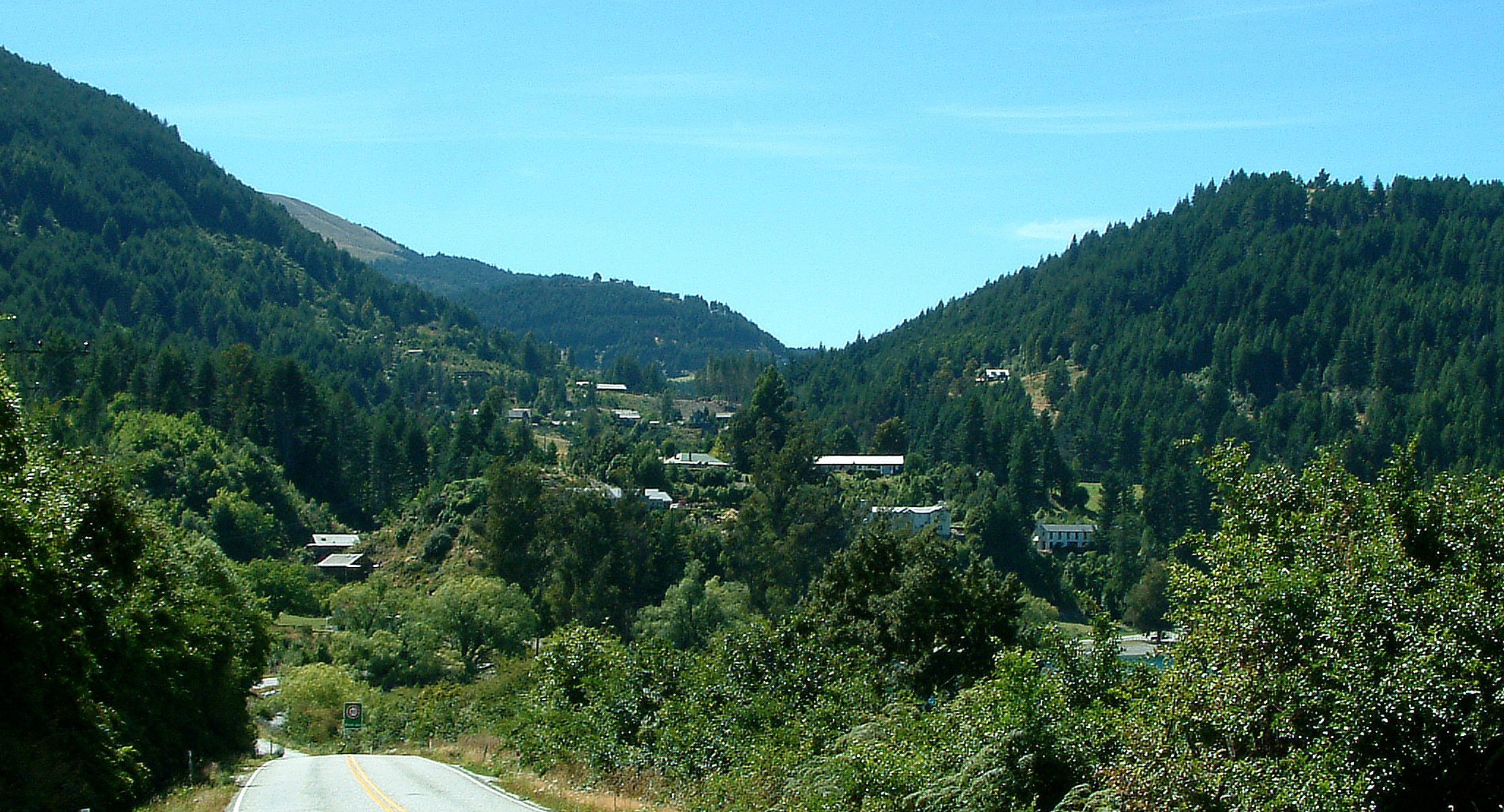
- Wilson Bay from the Queenstown-Glenorchy Road
- Interactive map of Closeburn
- Coordinates: 45.060366°S 168.566394°E
- Country: New Zealand
- Region: Otago
- Territorial authority: Queenstown Lakes District
- Ward: Queenstown-Wakatipu Ward

Government
  - Local authority: Queenstown-Lakes District Council
  - Regional council: Otago Regional Council

Area
  - Total: 4.77 km^{2} (1.84 sq mi)

Population (2018 census)
  - Total: 141
  - Density: 29.6/km^{2} (76.6/sq mi)
- Time zone: UTC+12 (NZST)
  - Summer (DST): UTC+13 (NZDT)
- Postcode: 9371
- Area code: 03
- Local iwi: Ngāi Tahu

Closeburn is a locality in Queenstown-Lakes District in the South Island of New Zealand. It is located a 10-minute drive from Queenstown on the Glenorchy–Queenstown Road.

Closeburn Station is a working farm in the area and is less than 2,000 hectares (4,900 acres) in size. It is owned by 27 shareholders.

== Demographics ==
Closeburn covers 4.77 km^{2} (1.84 sq mi). It is part of the much larger Outer Wakatipu statistical area.

Historical population
Year	Pop.	±% p.a.
2006	117	—
2013	141	+2.70%
2018	141	+0.00%

Closeburn had a population of 141 at the 2018 New Zealand census, unchanged since the 2013 census, and an increase of 24 people (20.5%) since the 2006 census. There were 63 households. There were 78 males and 63 females, giving a sex ratio of 1.24 males per female. The median age was 47.7 years (compared with 37.4 years nationally), with 12 people (8.5%) aged under 15 years, 12 (8.5%) aged 15 to 29, 108 (76.6%) aged 30 to 64, and 12 (8.5%) aged 65 or older.

Ethnicities were 95.7% European/Pākehā, 4.3% Māori, 2.1% Asian, and 4.3% other ethnicities (totals add to more than 100% since people could identify with multiple ethnicities).

Although some people objected to giving their religion, 66.0% had no religion, 19.1% were Christian, 2.1% were Hindu and 6.4% had other religions.

Of those at least 15 years old, 48 (37.2%) people had a bachelor or higher degree, and 9 (7.0%) people had no formal qualifications. The median income was $50,400, compared with $31,800 nationally. The employment status of those at least 15 was that 78 (60.5%) people were employed full-time and 24 (18.6%) were part-time.
