= Roaring Meg =

Roaring Meg may refer to:

- Roaring Meg (cannon), any of several large siege cannon
- Mons Meg, a famous cannon at Edinburgh Castle
- Roaring Meg (river), a tributary of New Zealand's Kawarau River
  - Roaring Meg hydro scheme, a hydroelectric scheme on the Kawarau River
    - Lower Roaring Meg power station
    - Upper Roaring Meg power station
- Roaring Meg (Stevenage), a retail park in Stevenage, Hertfordshire, England
- Roaring Meg (waterfall), a waterfall in the Daintree National Park in North Queensland, Australia
- The original name of the band Goats Don't Shave
- Tecomanthe burungu, also known as Roaring Meg Creek trumpet vine, a climbing plant from Queensland, Australia
