= Queenstown Trail =

Cycling and walking trail in New Zealand

Coordinates: 45.036023°S 168.674146°E

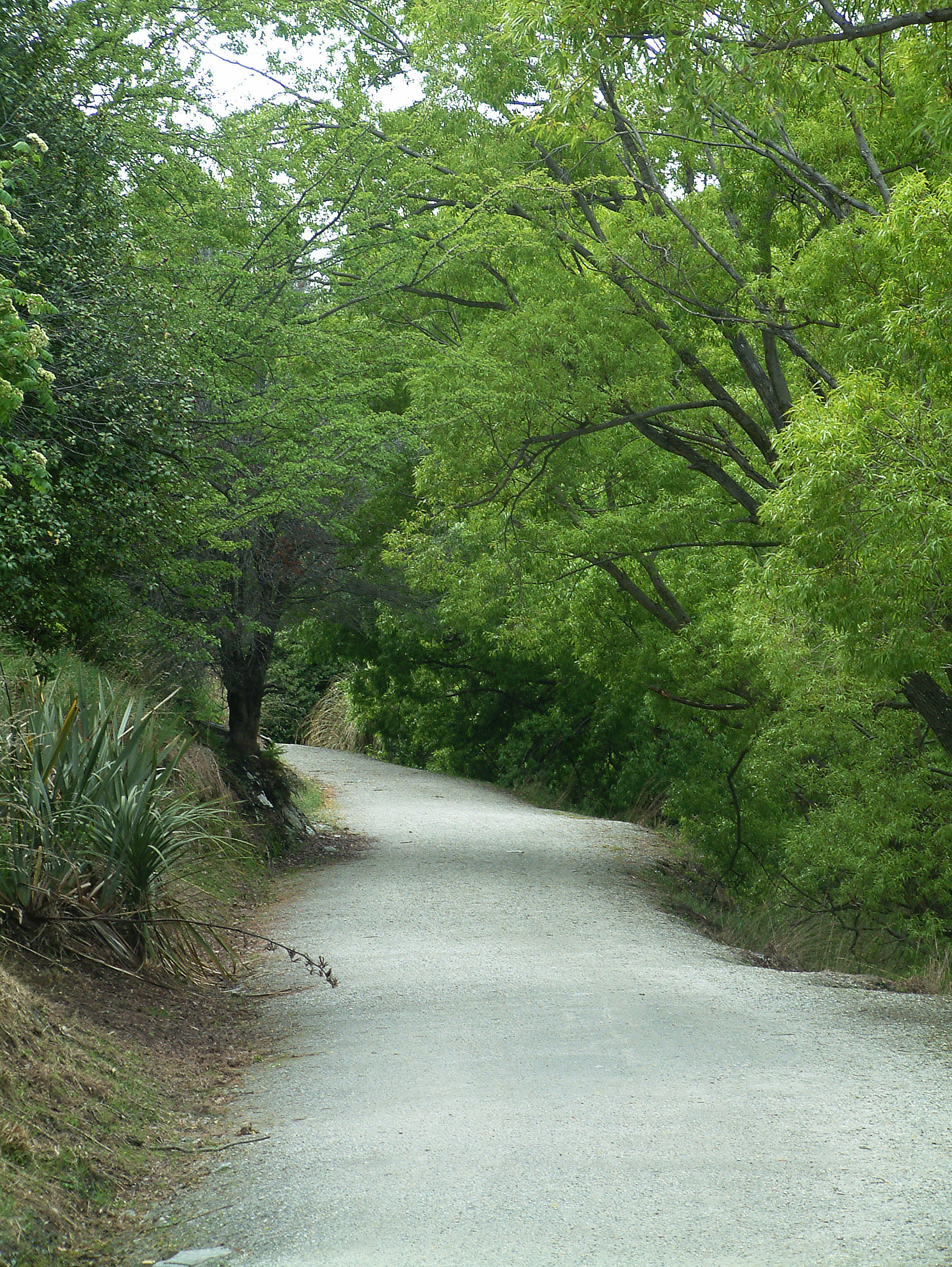
- Start of the Queenstown end of the track
- Length: 130 km (81 mi)
- Location: Queenstown, New Zealand
- Trailheads: Queenstown / Arrowtown / Gibbston / Jack's Point
- Use: Walking; Running; Cycling
- Highest point: 425 m near Arrowtown
- Lowest point: 300 m at Frankton Arm beach
- Difficulty: Easy / Intermediate / Advanced (depending on track)
- Season: Year round
- Hazards: Cliffs / Vehicles

The Queenstown Trail is a network of cycle and walking trails, initially funded as one of the projects of the New Zealand Cycle Trail (NZCT) system in Otago, New Zealand. It links the towns of Queenstown, Arrowtown, the suburb of Jack's Point and the area of Gibbston. The network of trails is at least 130 km in length, following the terrain often near rivers and lakes to link key places. In some places trails pass through private land such as working farms and users are encouraged to stay on the trail. The trail is a joint venture between the Government, Queenstown Lakes District Council and the Queenstown Trails Trust.

== Routes ==
Popular routes are listed below and can be started and finished in either direction:

=== Frankton Track & Kelvin Peninsula Trail ===
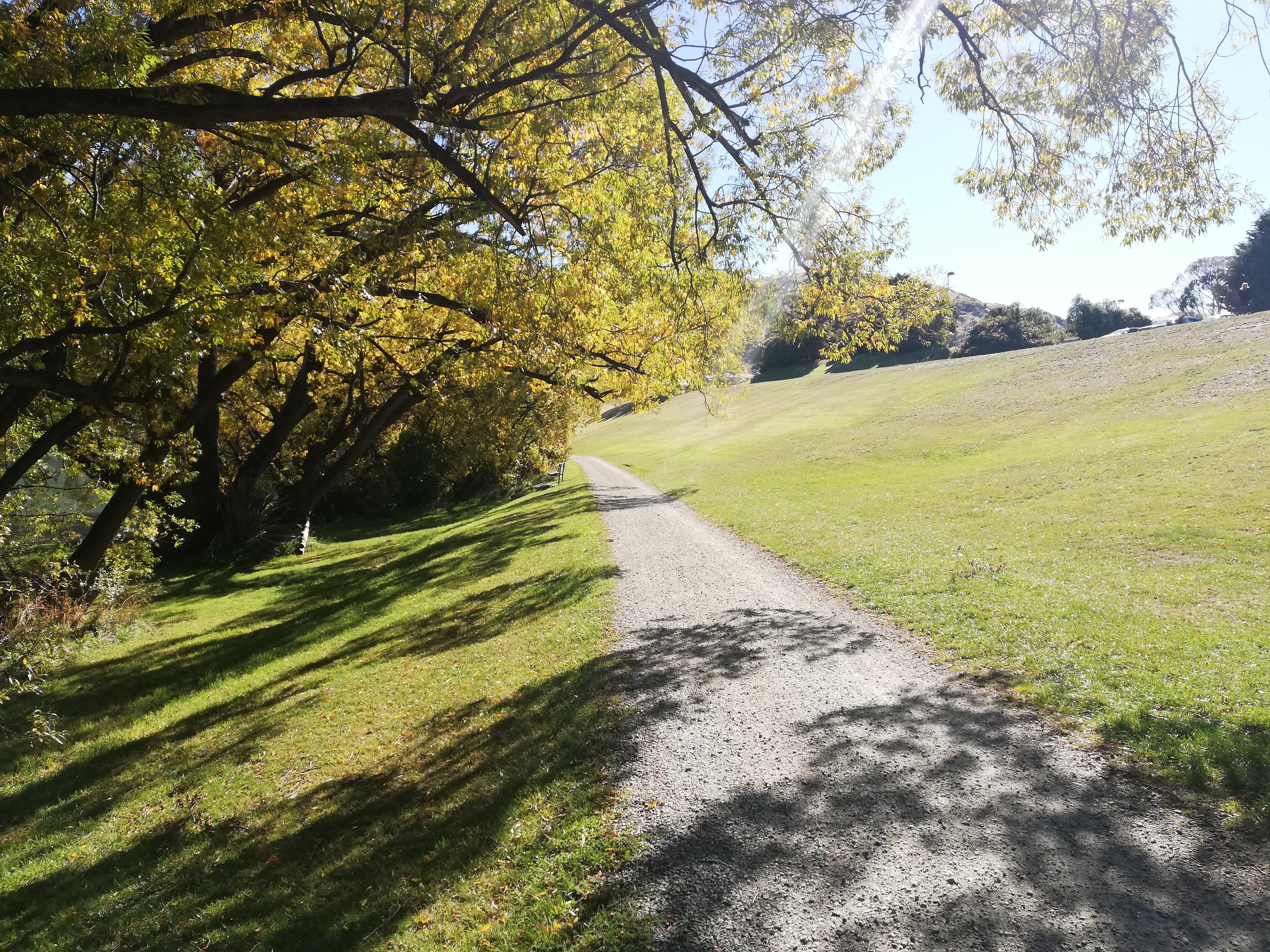
Frankton section of Trail

Links Queenstown and the Kelvin Peninsula. This track surrounds the Frankton Arm section of Lake Wakatipu. The track starts at Queenstown Gardens and runs parallel to Frankton Road near the lake edge. It passes through Frankton before going over the Kawarau Falls Bridge near State Highway 6. The track ends at the Queenstown Golf Club on the peninsula. The adjoining Jack’s Point trail starts from Jardine Park.

Due to major infrastructure upgrades along the Frankton Track, a detour via the sealed footpath alongside Frankton Road is in place between Park Street and the Frankton Marina throughout 2026.

=== Jack's Point Trail ===
Connects the area of Kelvin Heights part of the Kelvin Peninsula to Jack's Point.
Starts near the Queenstown Golf Club on the Kelvin Heights Peninsula
Views are wide open across Lake Wakatipu towards mountains such as Cecil Peak and Lake Wakatipu.

=== Countryside Trail ===
Links the locations of Queenstown and Arrowtown via Frankton. Passes over the old Lower Shotover Bridge which is above the Shotover River.

=== Lake Hayes Trail ===
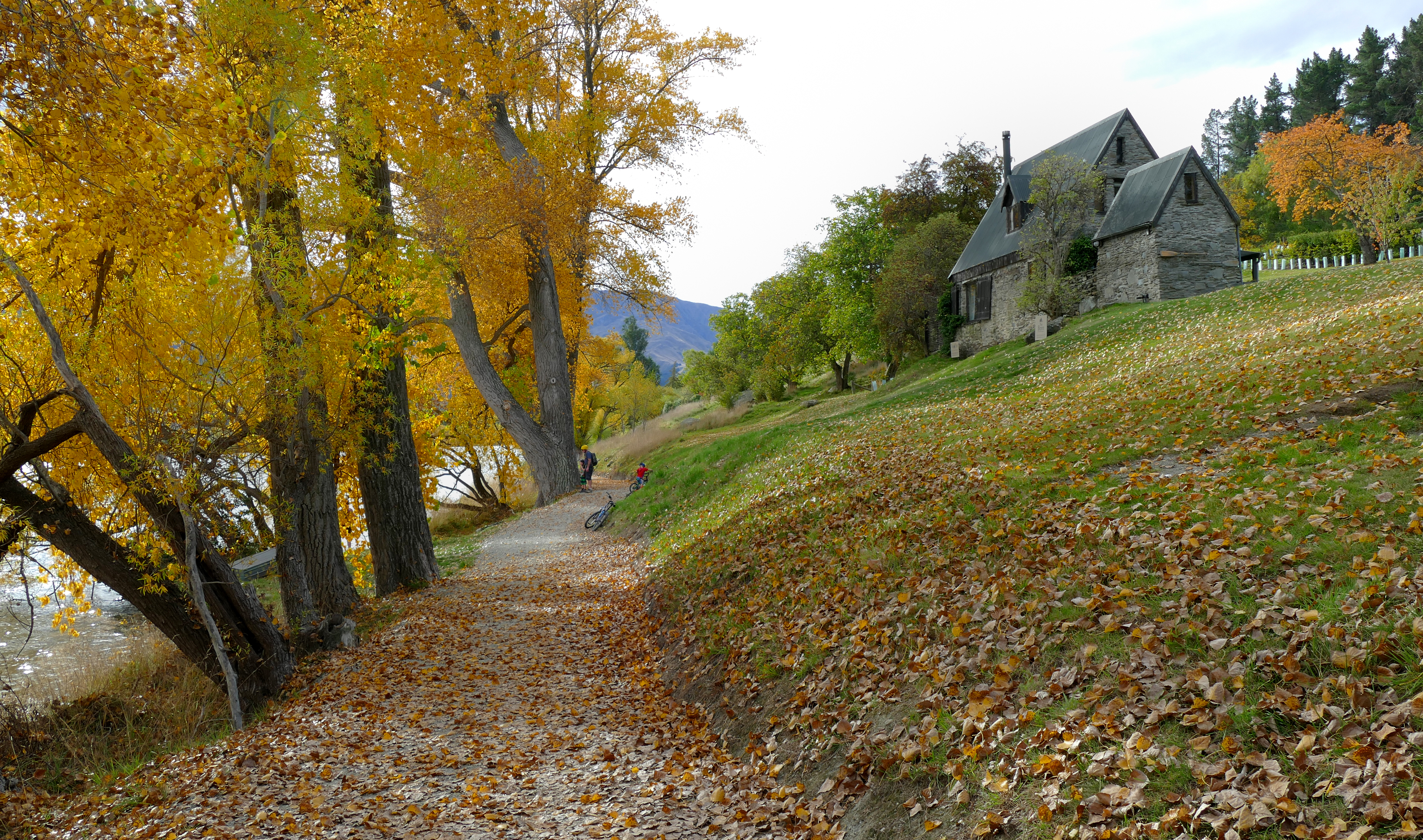
Lake Hayes Circuit

This is a route that encircles Lake Hayes. There are various points it can be started from including the Lake Hayes Pavilion next to State Highway 6 and the Picnic area at the north of the lake accessed via Arrowtown Road and also Rutherford Road (off Speargrass Flat Road). Was originally called the Lake Hayes Loop then the Lake Hayes Circuit but currently referred to as the Lake Hayes Trail. This track connects to the nearby Lake Hayes Estate residential sub-division.

=== Twin Rivers Trail ===
A route that links Frankton with the Lake Hayes area but also joins onto the Arrow River Bridges Ride. Passes both the Kawarau and Shotover Rivers and hence the name. Also goes past the suburb of Lake Hayes Estate and there is a track that can take you to the Lake Hayes Loop. Originally called the Twin River Ride it was changed to Twin Rivers Trail to reflect the diverse mix of users.

=== Arrow River Bridges Trail ===
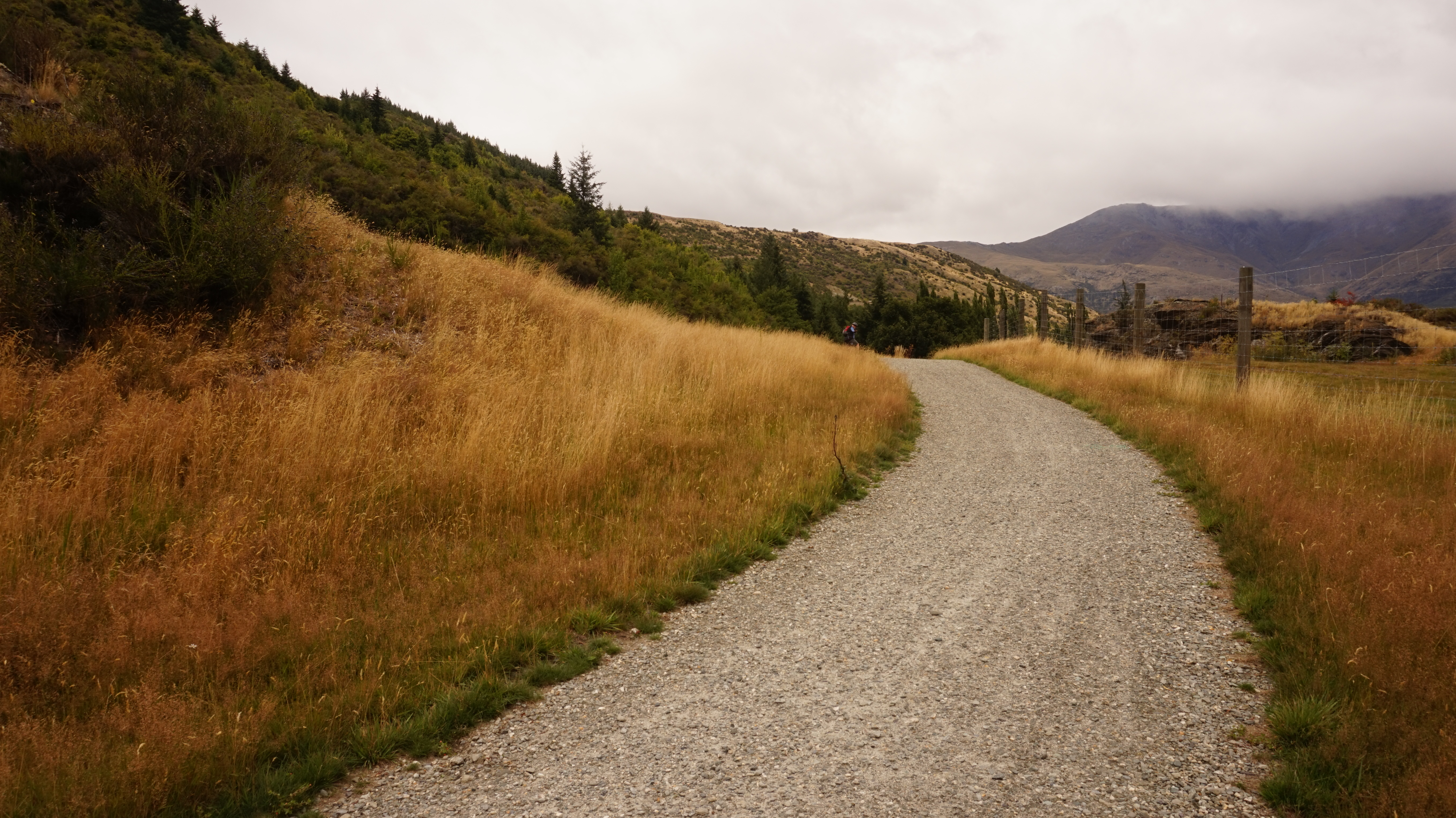
Arrow River Bridges Trail

This route connects Arrowtown to Gibbston. For much of its length follows the Arrow River. It can end at Chard Farm or can be linked onto the Gibbston River Trail. This trail contains many of the bridges that can be passed over on the Queenstown Trail as well as The Barfoot Tunnel. Originally called the Arrow River Bridges Ride it was changed to the Arrow River Bridges Trail to reflect the diverse mix of users.

=== Gibbston River Trail ===
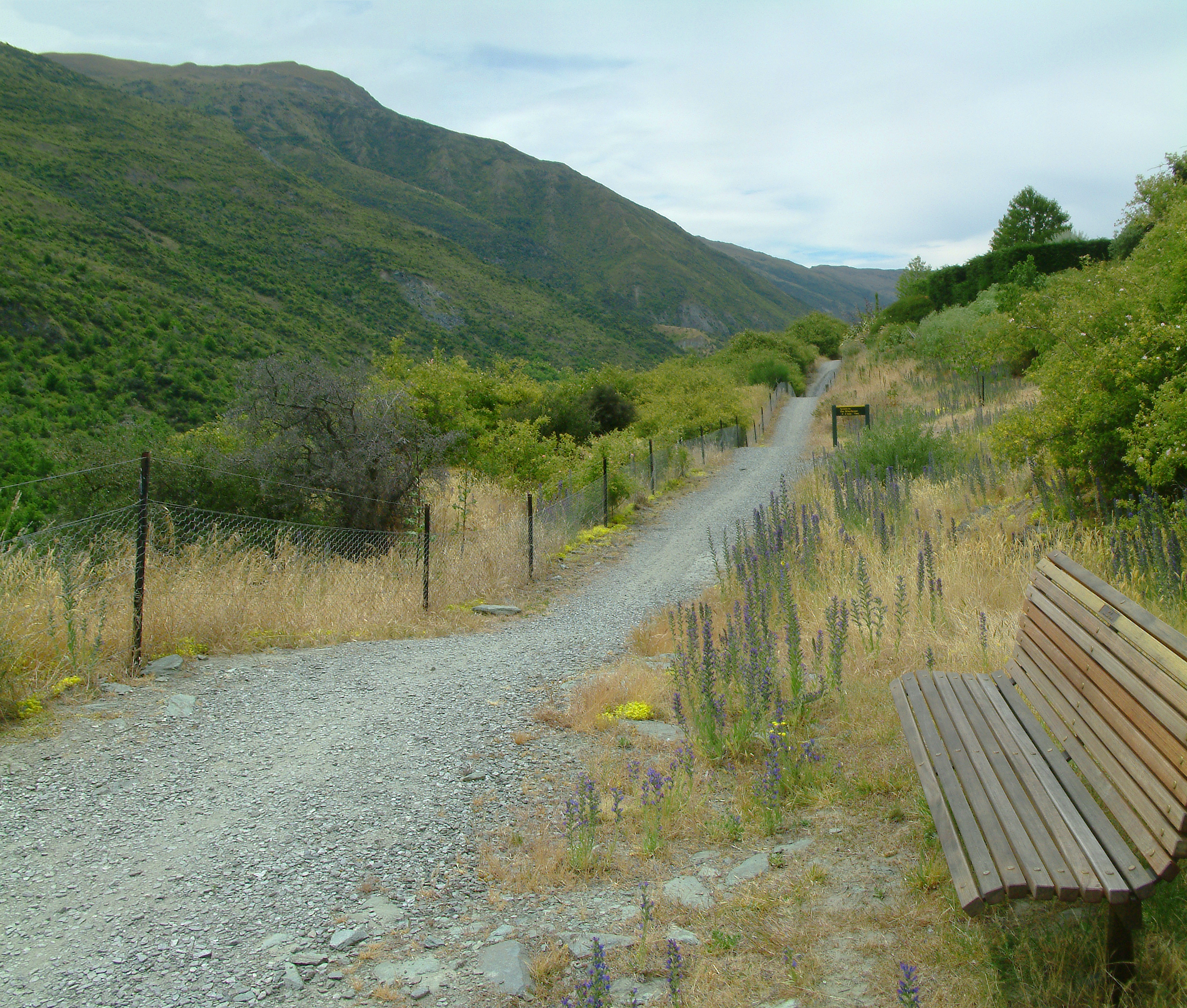
Gibbston River Trail

A route that passes along the Kawarau River around many vineyards in the Gibbston Valley. Carparks are available at each end of the track. There are also several loops in the track allowing for a varied or shorter route. This track was managed by Department of Conservation track until its upgrade in 2014 making it bike friendly and becoming officially part of the Queenstown Trail.

=== Shotover Gorge Trail ===
This trail is 5.5 km one way from Arthurs Point to Tucker Beach and was opened in 2025. It can also be accessed by the Littles Road carpark. It follows the Shotover River and has many switch backs near the Hugo Tunnel which is a highlight along with the long Kimi-ākau bridge.

== History ==
Originally the name for the network of trails in the region was the Wakatipu Trails before being renamed The Queenstown Trail. Signage on the trail simply calls it Queenstown Trail. The Wakatipu Trails Trust was set up in 2002 after a meeting between Duncan Field of QLDC and Chris Eden the DOC Wakatipu Area Manager at the time to assess the interest in created a network of recreational trails. In 2004 the Wakatipu Trails strategy was developed which helped to guide the development of the trails. The main routes of the Queenstown Trail now link up with many smaller tracks not part of the official trail many of which existed before its 2012 opening.

== Opening ==
The trail was opened on 18 October 2012 although many parts of the trail had already been constructed and were in regular use by the public before this date. It was officially opened by the Prime Minister John Key and cyclist Sarah Ulmer near Arrowtown. It had taken 3 years and more than 100 contractors costing $5.4 million (NZD) to build.

== Hazards ==
Several places of the trail have drop offs sometimes near rivers, occasionally bad weather can cause slips to occur which can temporarily close parts of the track. Although nearly the entire track is off-road a small number of sections cross either roads or driveways. There is also the potential for collisions between different users since they are travelling at different speeds and directions and there are quite a few blind corners.

== Gallery ==
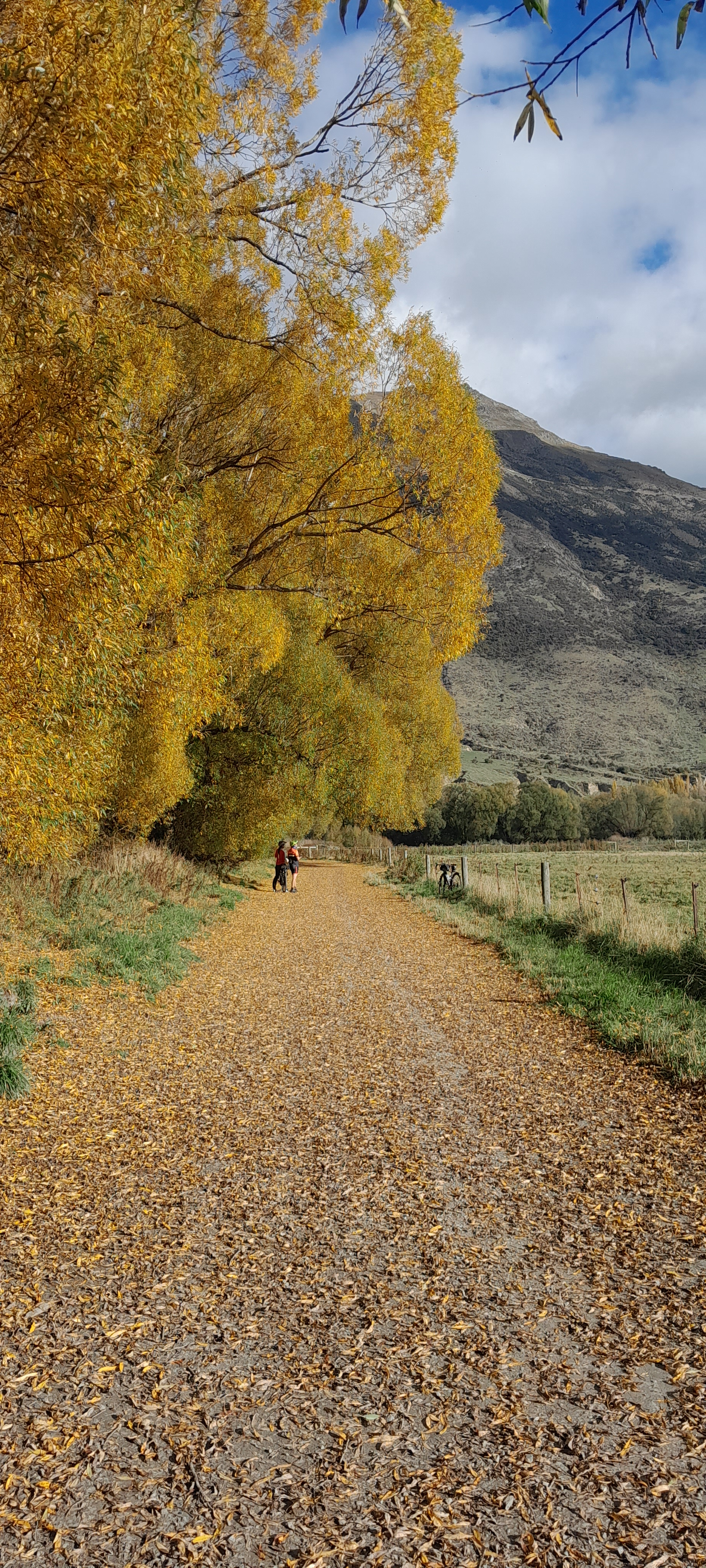
Twin Rivers Trail

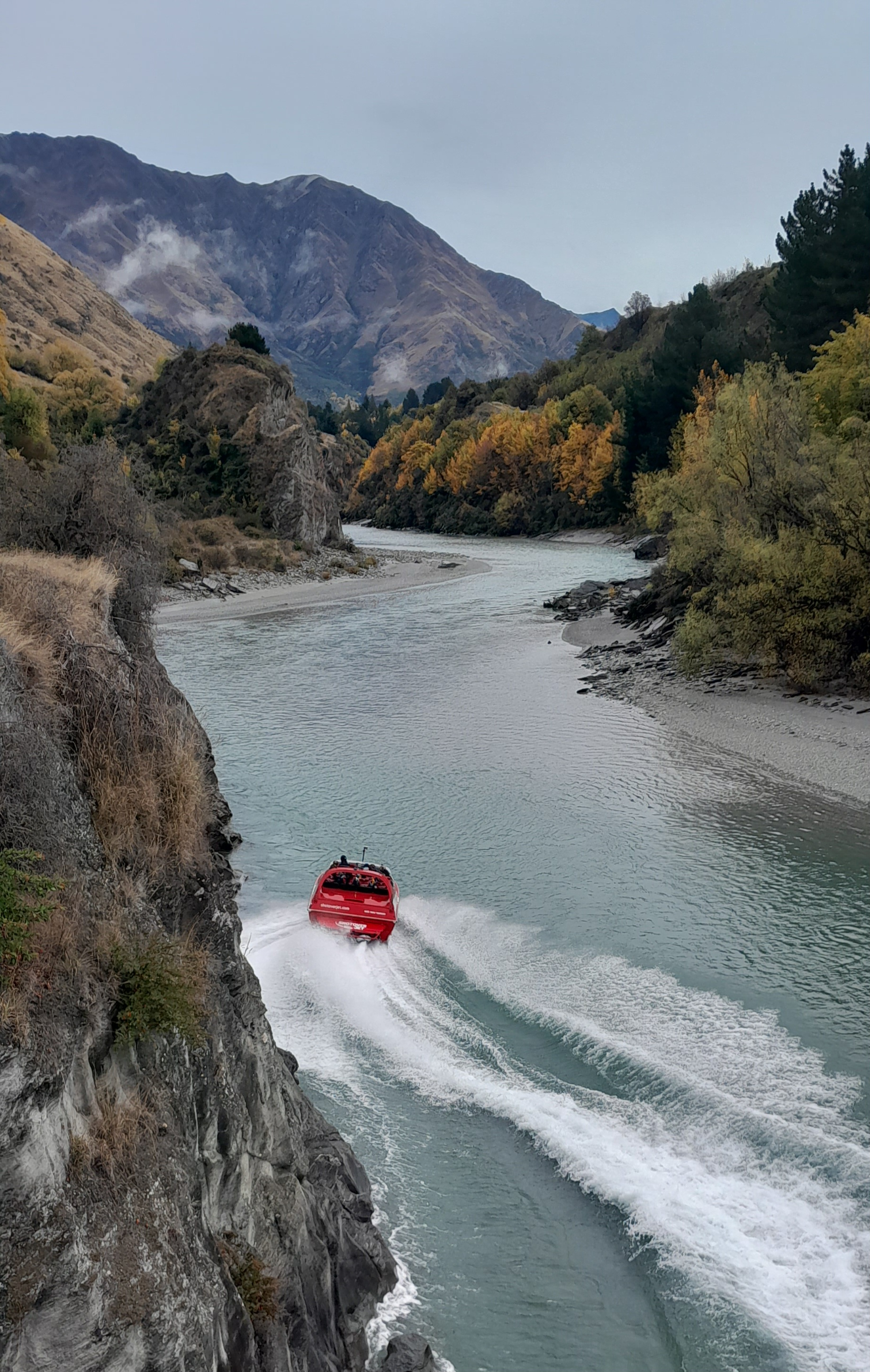
Shotover Jet

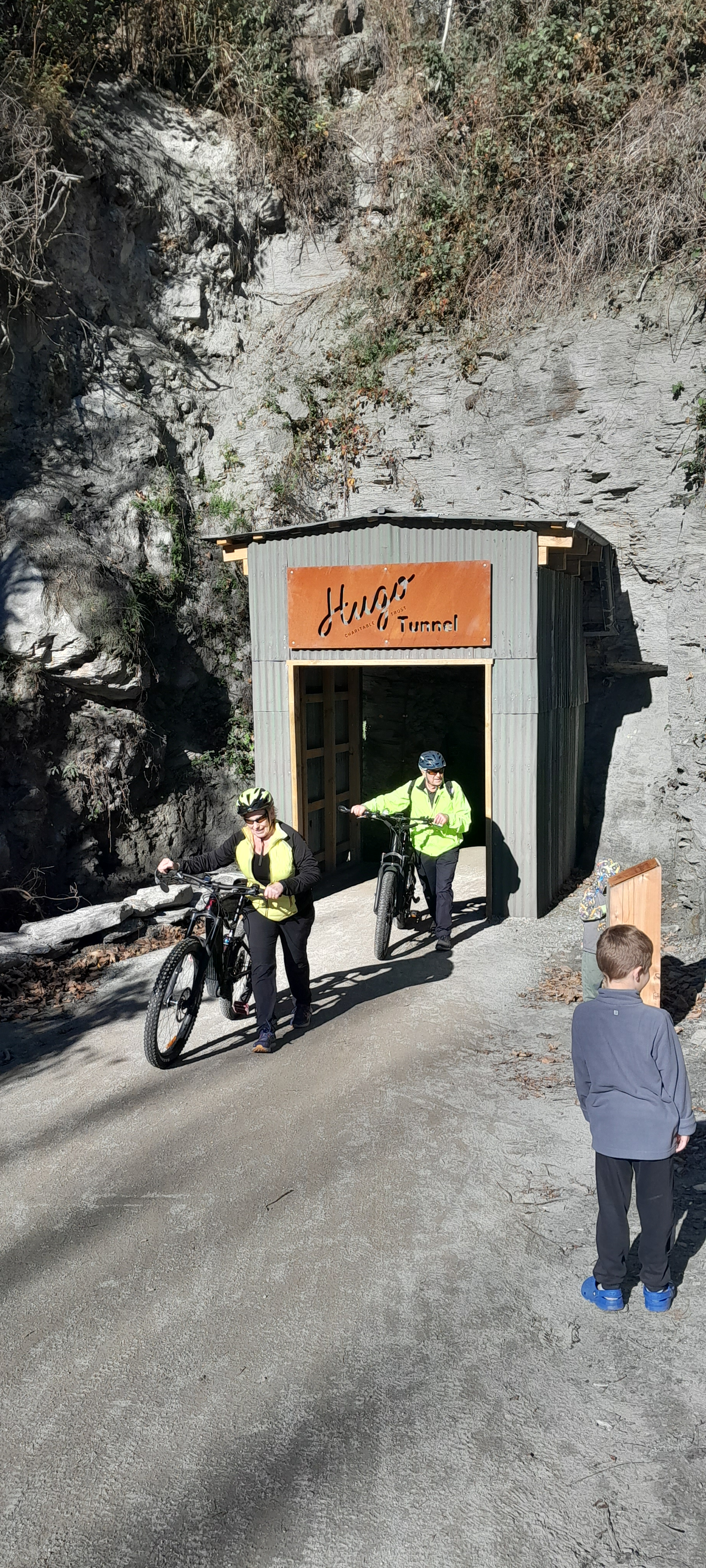
Hugo Tunnel

== Structures ==
As part of the Queenstown Trail there are three existing bridges (built before the trail was conceived) and six new structures (two wooden bridges, two suspension bridges, an underbridge and a tunnel). The bridges and tunnel built specifically for the Queenstown Trail were named after families that made significant donations towards the project.

=== Pre-existing structures ===
- Lower Shotover Bridge: This is a restored historic bridge that used to be used for traffic but is now used by cyclists and pedestrians.
- Kawarau Falls Bridge: Originally this old bridge had space for pedestrians on one side and an alternating one way section for traffic. In 2018 a traffic bridge was built nearby and the Kawarau Falls Bridge became a pedestrian only bridge.

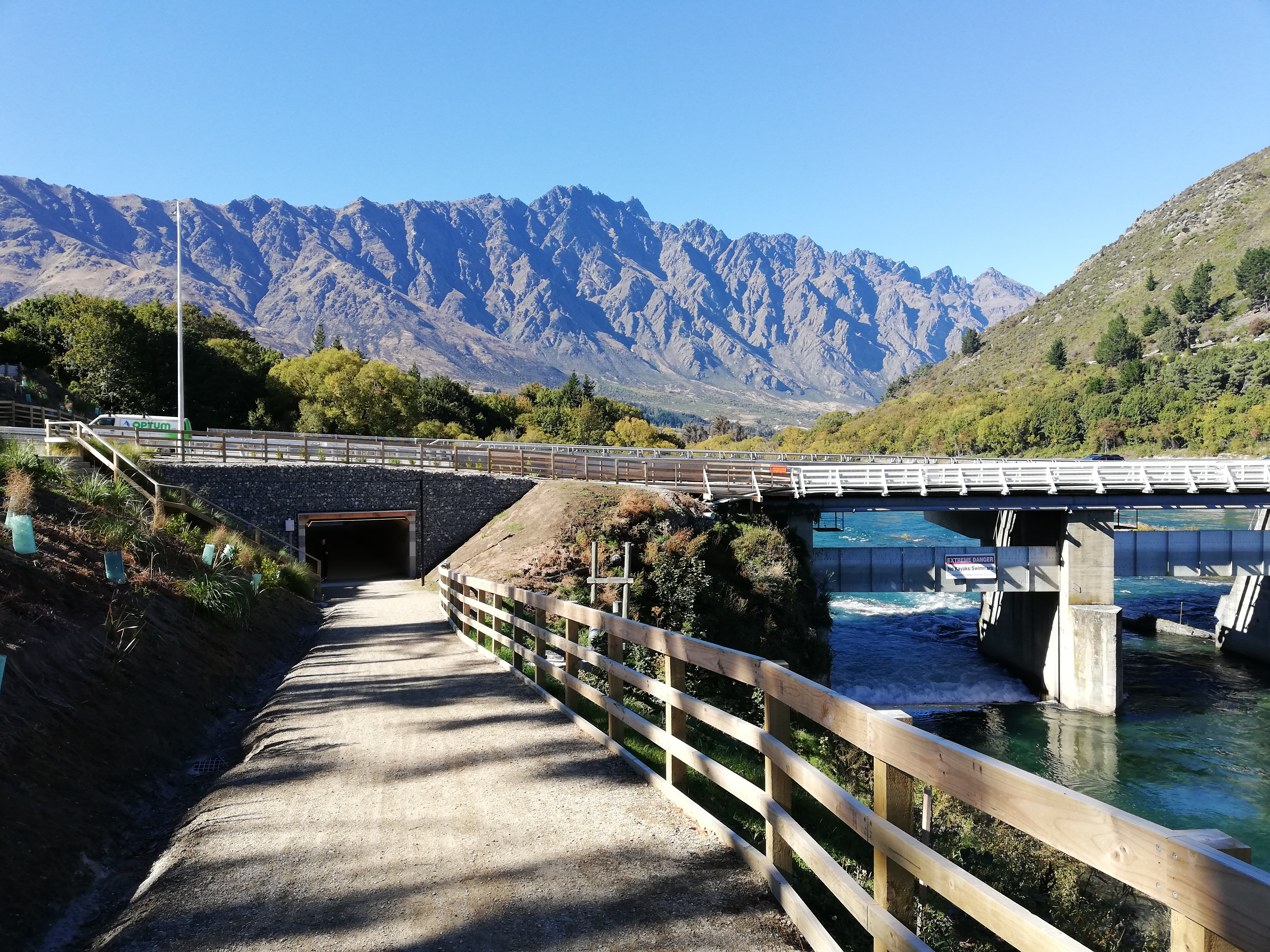
Kawarau Falls Bridge and underpass

- Kawarau Gorge Suspension Bridge: This is the bridge used by the AJ Hackett Bungy Company.

=== Structures built for the Trail ===
In order to transverse sections of the trail that crossed rivers or roads these structures were built for trail users and funded by supporters:

- The Edgar Bridge: This is an 80 metre suspension bridge over the Arrow Gorge and named after Sir Eion and Lady Edgar.
- The Barfoot Tunnel: The Barfoot Tunnel, under State Highway 6, was made possible by a donation from Garth and Judy Barfoot, of Auckland.
- The Knights Family Bridge: Named after the family that made a donation for the under bridge that goes beneath State Highway 6.
- The Southern Discoveries Bridge: A second suspension bridge that goes over the Arrow River near to where the opening ceremony was held.
- The Swain Bridge: The Swain Bridge is to be found on the Arrowtown Millennium Trail. Named after Ken Swain a Queenstown Trails Trust trustee.
- Billie’s Bridge: This is a mini bridge that runs over Hayes Creek (the outflow of Lake Hayes which flows into the Kawarau River) and is named after a member of the Sargood family.
