= Gibbston =

Community and wine region in Otago, New Zealand

- Community
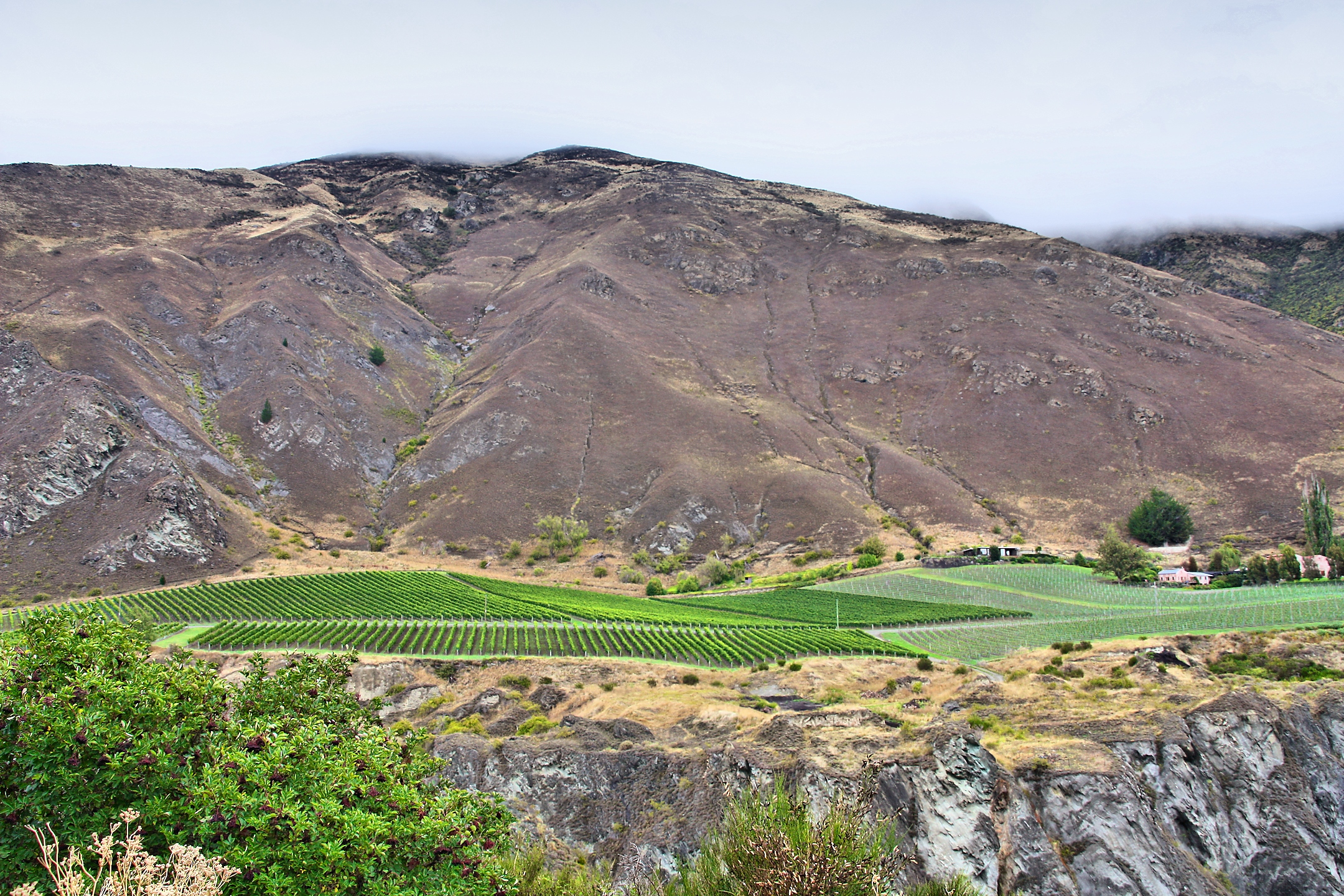
- One of the area's vineyards
- Interactive map of Gibbston
- Coordinates: 45.02569°S 168.95674°E
- Country: New Zealand
- Region: Otago
- Territorial authority: Queenstown-Lakes District
- Ward: Arrowtown-Kawarau Ward
- Electorates: Southland; Te Tai Tonga (Māori)

Government
  - Territorial authority: Queenstown-Lakes District Council
  - Regional council: Otago Regional Council
  - Mayor of Queenstown-Lakes: John Glover
  - Southland MP: Joseph Mooney
  - Te Tai Tonga MP: Tākuta Ferris
- Time zone: UTC+12 (NZST)
  - Summer (DST): UTC+13 (NZDT)
- Local iwi: Ngāi Tahu

Gibbston is a community in the Wakatipu Basin in the Otago region of the South Island, New Zealand. Through the valley runs the Kawarau River which forms the Kawarau Gorge.

The most visible aspect of the area are the vineyards and wineries next to SH 6 which form part of the Central Otago wine region. The Gibbston region is the coolest and highest of the Central Otago regions with the majority of land gently sloping to the north. This northerly aspect greatly assists vineyards to grow grapes because of increased sunlight and with a reduced possibility of frost, although this still poses a significant threat.

It was voted community of the year in 2011 due to the work on the Gibbston River Trail.

The Gibbston River Trail and the Gibbston Highway Trail are walking/running and cycling trails that give good access to the wineries in the area but also connect to The Queenstown Trail at the Kawarau Gorge Suspension Bridge.

Often Gibbston is incorrectly called Gibbston Valley or Gibbston Flats due to the land being the only flat usable land in the Kawarau Gorge.

== Demographics ==
Gibbston is part of the Outer Wakatipu statistical area, which covers 1,862.92 km^{2} (719.28 sq mi) and surrounds but does not include Queenstown and Arrowtown. It had an estimated population of 530 as of June 2025, with a population density of 0.28 people per km^{2}.

Historical population
Year	Pop.	±% p.a.
2006	537	—
2013	657	+2.92%
2018	822	+4.58%

Before the 2023 census, Outer Wakatipu had a larger boundary, covering 1,880.06 km^{2} (725.90 sq mi). Using that boundary, Outer Wakatipu had a population of 822 at the 2018 New Zealand census, an increase of 165 people (25.1%) since the 2013 census, and an increase of 285 people (53.1%) since the 2006 census. There were 282 households, comprising 420 males and 405 females, giving a sex ratio of 1.04 males per female. The median age was 42.9 years (compared with 37.4 years nationally), with 144 people (17.5%) aged under 15 years, 96 (11.7%) aged 15 to 29, 513 (62.4%) aged 30 to 64, and 69 (8.4%) aged 65 or older.

Ethnicities were 93.4% European/Pākehā, 6.2% Māori, 0.7% Pasifika, 2.6% Asian, and 3.6% other ethnicities. People may identify with more than one ethnicity.

The percentage of people born overseas was 31.4, compared with 27.1% nationally.

Although some people chose not to answer the census's question about religious affiliation, 66.1% had no religion, 25.9% were Christian, 0.4% were Hindu, 0.4% were Buddhist and 1.8% had other religions.

Of those at least 15 years old, 225 (33.2%) people had a bachelor's or higher degree, and 60 (8.8%) people had no formal qualifications. The median income was $51,400, compared with $31,800 nationally. 201 people (29.6%) earned over $70,000 compared to 17.2% nationally. The employment status of those at least 15 was that 432 (63.7%) people were employed full-time, 126 (18.6%) were part-time, and 3 (0.4%) were unemployed.

== Vineyards and wineries in the area ==
- Brennan Wines
- Chard Farm
- Coal Pit Wines
- Gibbston Highgate Estate
- Gibbston Valley Wines
- Hawkshead
- Kinross
- Mt Edward
- Mt Rosa
- Nevis Bluff
- Peregrine Wines
- Two Paddocks
- Valli Vineyards
- Waitiri Creek Wines

Grape varieties grown in the area include: Chardonnay, Pinot Gris, Riesling, Sauvignon Blanc and Pinot Noir. Lesser known (and grown in smaller quantities) are the varieties of Gamay, Gewürztraminer, Pinot Blanc and Pinot Meunier.

== Dark sky park ==
The Kawarau Gibbston Dark Sky Park is a dark-sky preserve located between Cromwell and Queenstown, and centred on Gibbston. The park was accredited by DarkSky International in May 2024, following an application by the Gibbston Community Association. It covers an area of 25 km^{2} (9.7 sq mi) along a section of the Kawarau River.
