= Kawarau Gorge =

River gorge in Central Otago, New Zealand

Coordinates: 45.02°S 169.09°E

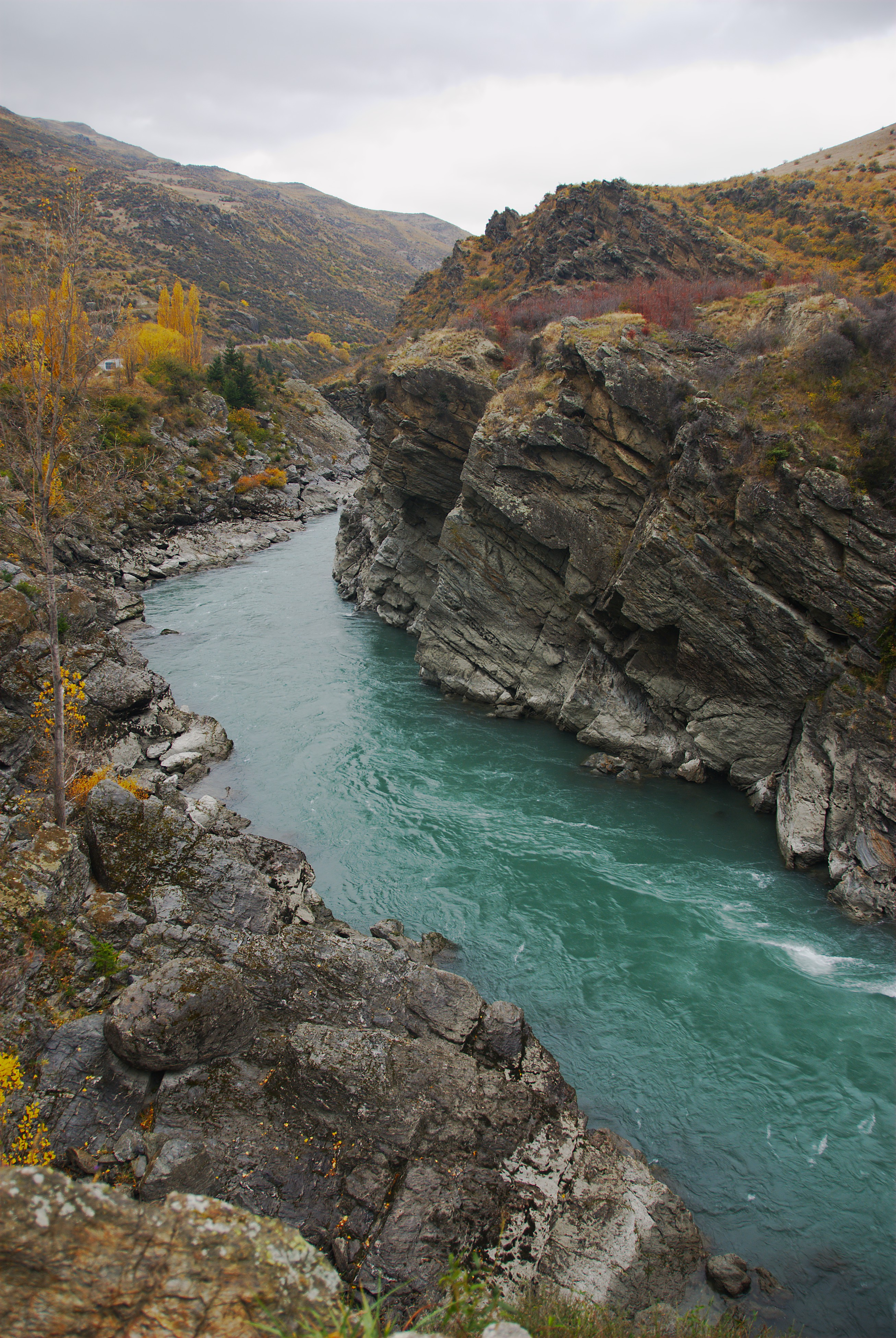
Kawarau River flowing through the Kawarau Gorge, immediately downstream from Roaring Meg tributary

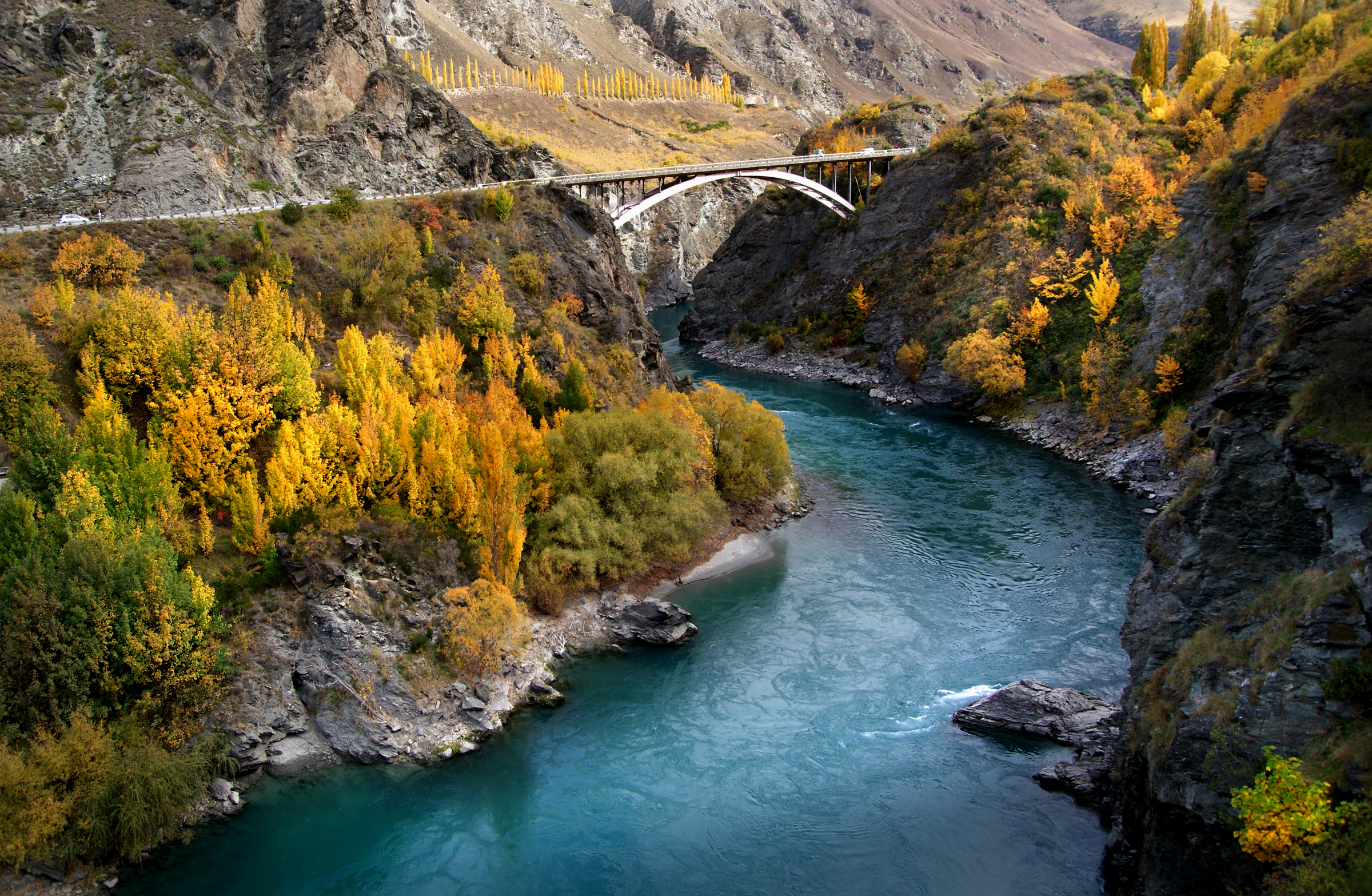
Kawarau Gorge with the Kawarau Gorge Suspension Bridge in view.

The Kawarau Gorge is a major river gorge created by the Kawarau River in Central Otago, in the South Island of New Zealand. The towns of Queenstown and Cromwell are linked by State Highway 6 through the gorge.

The gorge begins some 30 kilometres from Queenstown, close to the wine-growing community of Gibbston and the large rock outcrop known as the Nevis Bluff. It continues for some 25 kilometres before the river emerges into the upper valley of the Clutha River close to the settlement of Ripponvale. The gorge is the site of several extreme sports, including bungy jumping at the Kawarau Gorge Suspension Bridge, and white-water sports such as kayaking and riverboarding, and one of only two known areas where the nationally critical endangered fungus weevil Cerius otagensis has been found.

== Name ==
The name Kawarau literally translates to many shrubs. Kawa: shrub, rau: many.

== History ==
The Kawarau gorge's first historical significance was as a travel route to the South Island's West Coast. A natural bridge, "Whatatorere", where the river narrows to 1.2 metres (3.9 ft), was important first to early Māori and then to goldminers as the only place the Clutha and Kawarau rivers could be crossed without boats. Māori were heading for the Cardrona Valley to reach Wānaka, and on to the Haast Pass to seek pounamu.

In the 1860s, the gorge was the site of much activity during the Otago gold rush. The preserved remains of several miner's cottages (notably those of Chinese migrants) can be seen above the banks of the river. The Roaring Meg hydro scheme and Goldfields Mining Centre are in the gorge. Visitors can experience panning for gold at the Goldfields Mining Centre.

A 2004 accident resulted in two hundred litres of hypochlorous acid spilling into the gorge, the acid cleaned the highway but caused no environmental damage. Three New Zealand Army soldiers died during a training exercise in 2005 when their Unimog fell 100 m down the gorge into the river.

== See also ==
- Cromwell Gorge
