= Two Paddocks =

New Zealand wine producer

- Location: Gibbston, New Zealand
- Coordinates: 45.2198°S 169.3027°E
- Wine region: Central Otago
- Other labels: Picnic
- Founded: 1993; 33 years ago
- Key people: Sam Neill
- Known for: Proprietor's Reserve Pinot Noir
- Varietals: Pinot Noir, Riesling, Sauvignon Blanc
- Other products: Lavender oil
- Tasting: Club member events only
- Website: twopaddocks.com

Two Paddocks is a wine producer based in Central Otago, New Zealand. It was owned and operated by actor and entrepreneur Sam Neill.

== History ==
In 1993, actor Sam Neill established the Two Paddocks company with a planting of 5 acres (2.0 ha) of Pinot Noir on a small vineyard at Gibbston, Central Otago.

Alex Paddocks is a 7-acre (2.8 ha) vineyard on a terrace above the Earnscleugh River under some rocky headlands. It was planted with Burgundian Pinot Noir vines (5, 6, 115) in 1998.

Numerous animals Neill named after celebrities live in his vineyards. A kunekune is named after actor Bryan Brown. A cow is named after Helena Bonham Carter.

In 2000, the company acquired Redbank Paddocks, a sheltered 60 acres (24 ha), also in the Earnscleugh River valley, which nestles between two rocky escarpments. It is planted with more Burgundian clones (777, 667, and 115) and some Riesling.

In 2001, Two Paddocks acquired an interest in another winery, The Central Otago Wine Company, with an approximate production of 3,000 cases of wine a year.

The original vineyard, First Paddock, was augmented by two other small vineyards in the Alexandra district. After incorporating a second vineyard established by neighbouring film director Roger Donaldson, Neill changed to the current name. Donaldson eventually built another vineyard, Sleeping Dogs, named after the 1977 film which was his directorial debut and Neill's first feature film.

"The Last Chance" Pinot Noir is a single vineyard bottling from the Alex Paddocks plot, its first vintage in 2002. The company also produces the second label Picnic, largely with sourced fruit, with bottlings of Pinot Noir, Sauvignon Blanc, and Riesling varietals. Two Paddocks also grows medicinal and culinary herbs, such as lavender oil and saffron.

== See also ==
- The Central Otago wine region
- List of celebrities who own wineries and vineyards
