= Cerius otagensis =

Conservation status
- Nationally Critical (NZ TCS)

Scientific classification
- Domain: Eukaryota
- Kingdom: Animalia
- Phylum: Arthropoda
- Class: Insecta
- Order: Coleoptera
- Suborder: Polyphaga
- Infraorder: Cucujiformia
- Family: Anthribidae
- Genus: Cerius
- Species: C. otagensis

Binomial name
- Cerius otagensis Holloway, 1982

Species of beetle

Cerius otagensis is a species of flightless fungus weevil that is endemic to New Zealand. It has been found in only two locations in the Central Otago region.

== Discovery ==
Only four female specimens have ever been collected and the male of the species remains unknown. The species was discovered by J. S. Dugdale on 25 November 1974 at Gentle Annie Creek, Kawarau Gorge. Three specimens were collected by him while beating a Carmichaelia shrub. On 27 October 1981 a fourth specimen was collected by J. C. Watt 4 kilometres (2.5 mi) north of Lindis Crossing as a result of beating Carmichaelia petriei. These collections indicate that C. otagensis is likely to be associated with Camichaelia.

== Description ==
This species was first described in 1982 by B. A. Holloway and the holotype specimen is held in the New Zealand Arthropod Collection at Landcare Research. C. otagensis is a small beetle measuring between 2.4–2.7mm in length and has a width of 1.3–1.4mm. Its head is covered with silver and yellow scales and its body also has mainly yellow and silver scales but with dark brown scales scattered amongst them. One specimen was dissected and evidence of fungi, possibly of the genus Stigmella, was found in its gut indicating that C. otagensis feeds upon that genus of fungi.
