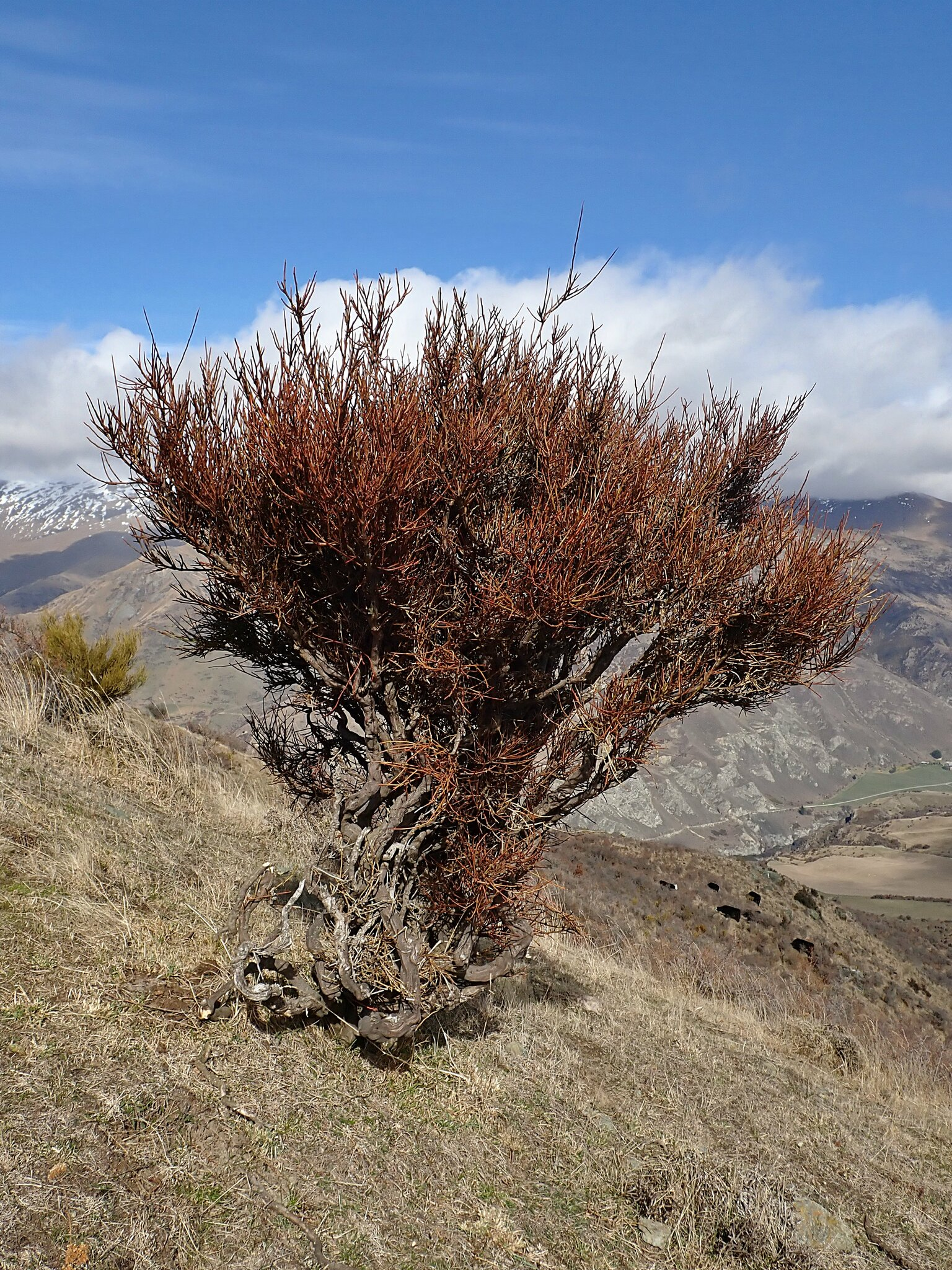

Conservation status
- Declining (NZ TCS)

Scientific classification
- Kingdom: Plantae
- Clade: Tracheophytes
- Clade: Angiosperms
- Clade: Eudicots
- Clade: Rosids
- Order: Fabales
- Family: Fabaceae
- Subfamily: Faboideae
- Genus: Carmichaelia
- Species: C. petriei

Binomial name
- Carmichaelia petriei Kirk, 1899
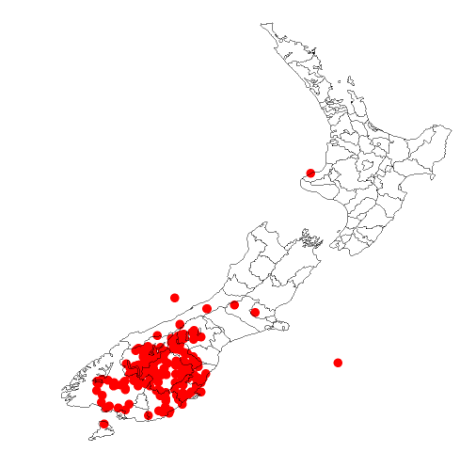
- Occurrence data from AVH

Synonyms
- Carmichaelia petriei var. petriei Kirk, 1899; Carmichaelia petriei var. minor G.Simpson, 1945; Carmichaelia ramosa G.Simpson, 1945; Carmichaelia virgata Kirk, 1899

= Carmichaelia petriei =

Species of legume endemic to New Zealand

Carmichaelia petriei is a species of New Zealand broom in the genus Carmichaelia. It is endemic to New Zealand. C. petrieis is possibly a host plant for the critically endangered fungus weevil Cerius otagensis.

== Taxonomy ==
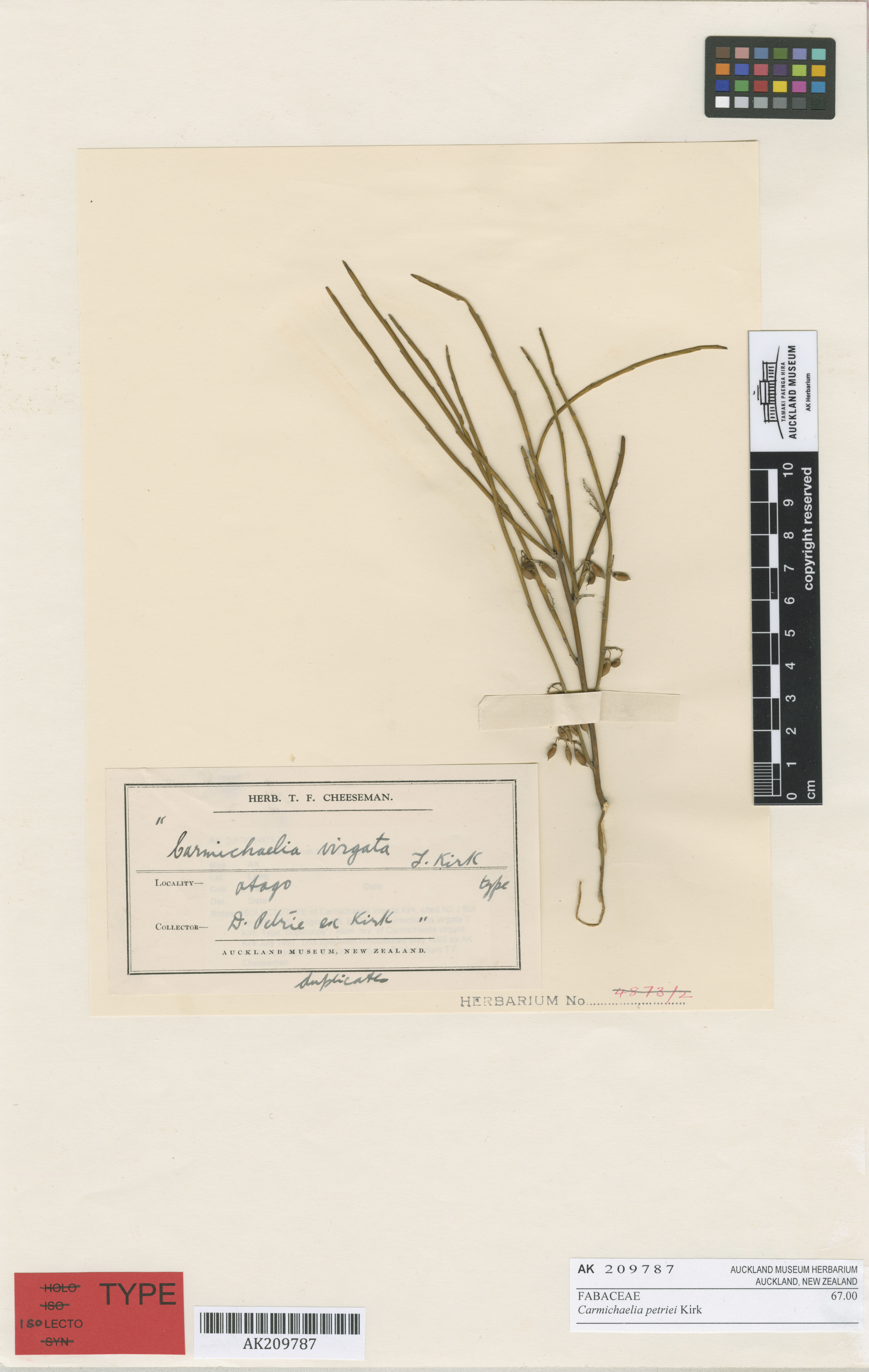
Isolectotype specimen held at the Auckland War Memorial Museum

Carmichaelia petriei was first described by Thomas Kirk in his book The students' flora of New Zealand and the outlying islands published in 1899. He named the plant in honour of Donald Petrie, the discoverer of the species. The isolectotype specimen of C. petriei can be found at the Auckland War Memorial Museum.

== Description ==
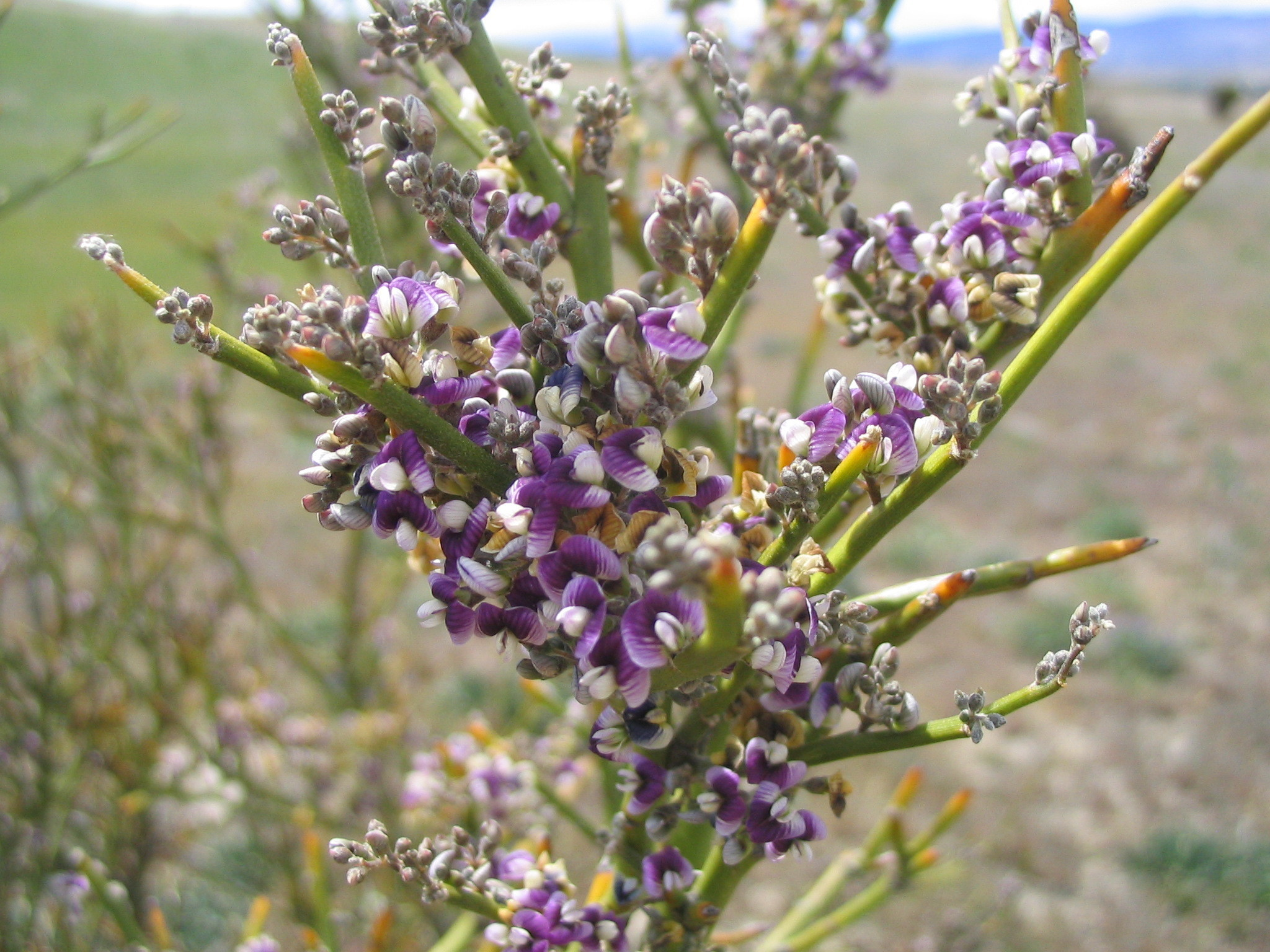
Carmichaelia petriei flowering

Carmichaelia petriei is an upright but stout looking shrub, sparingly branched and growing up to 2.5 meters high and 2 meters wide. Its branchlets are coloured green, yellow green or bronze green and are leafless. Its flowers are coloured violet, purple and white and can be seen from November to January. The shrub produces seed from January to May. It can be distinguished from other Carmichaelia species by the appearance of its seed pods which droop as they ripen and seeds that drop off when they reach maturity.

== Distribution ==
Carmichaelia petriei is endemic to New Zealand and can be found in the South Island, as far north as the upper part of the Waitaki River Valley in Canterbury, as well as in the MacKenzie Basin, Otago and Southland including Stewart Island.

== Habitat ==
This species grows in scrub and tussock grassland among rocks in montane, lowland or coastal sites. It can be found in river gorges or on terraces, cliffs and in the margins of forests.

== Ecology ==
One of only four specimens of the critically endangered fungus weevil Cerius otagensis was collected from the beating of a C. petriei plant. That this weevil was collected from C. petriei implies that this species of Carmichaelia may be a host plant for that endangered insect.

== Conservation status ==
Carmichaelia petriei had a large stable population and was therefore classified by the Department of Conservation (DOC) as being "Not Threatened" in 2013. But in 2017, it was reclassified as "At Risk - Declining".
