= Roaring Meg hydro scheme =

Hydroelectric power stations

Coordinates: 45°0′6″S 169°4′8″E

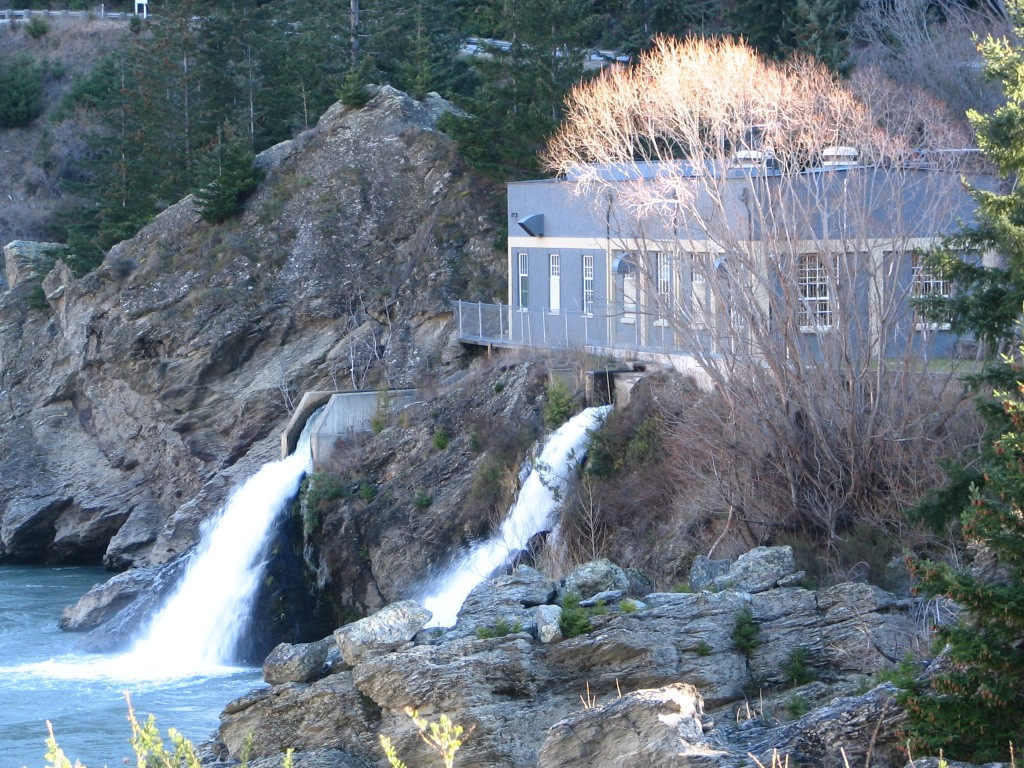
Roaring Meg lower power station

The Roaring Meg hydro scheme refers to two small hydro electricity power stations fed by the Roaring Meg Dam. The scheme is located next to the Roaring Meg Stream in the Kawarau Gorge, near Cromwell, New Zealand. Roaring Meg is owned and operated by Pioneer Energy.

== History ==
The scheme was built by the Otago Central Power Board starting in 1934 and commissioned 1936, at a cost of 40,000 pounds. At times the lower station has been flooded by the Kawarau River.

== Layout ==
The scheme starts with the 10 metres (33 ft) high Roaring Meg Dam located 3.6 kilometres (2.2 mi) upstream from the confluence with the Kawarau River. The intake flows into a series of pipes connected to the power stations. The upper station discharges into both a pipe feeding the lower station and the Roaring Meg Stream, while the lower station discharges into the Kawarau River.

== Performance ==
Annual energy production from both stations is approximately 30 gigawatt-hours (110 TJ).

Lower Roaring Meg station:

- Two turbines
- Operating Head 304 metres (997 ft)
- Combined Output 3,000 kilowatts (4,000 hp)
- Flow 1300 litres per second

Upper Roaring Meg station:

- Two turbines
- Operating Head 125 metres (410 ft)
- Combined Output 1,263 kilowatts (1,694 hp)
- Flow 1300 litres per second
