= Kawarau Gorge Suspension Bridge =

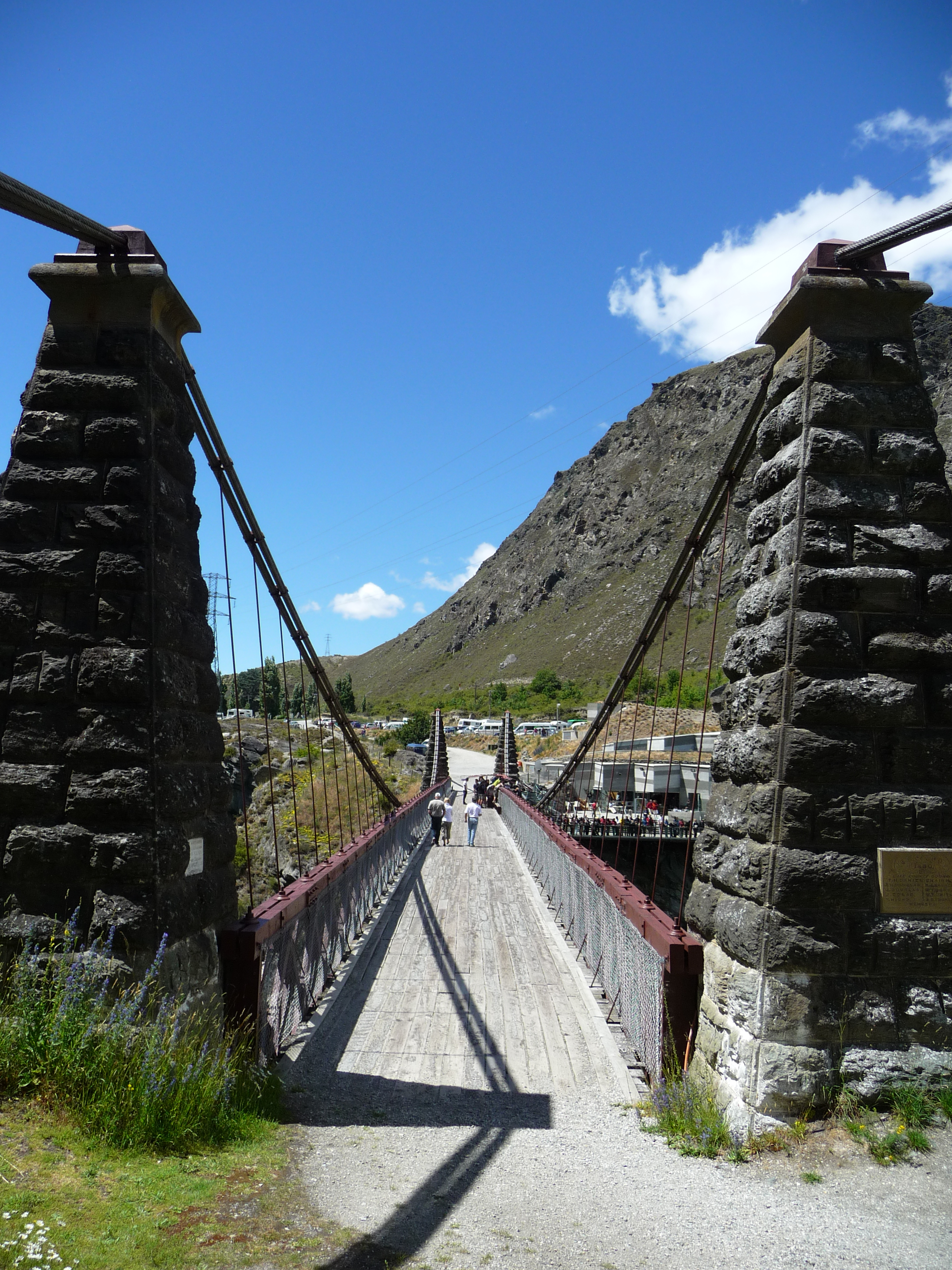
- Coordinates: 45.009°S 168.899°E
- Crosses: Kawarau River
- Locale: Otago
- Heritage status: Category I historic place

Location
- Interactive map of Kawarau Gorge Suspension Bridge

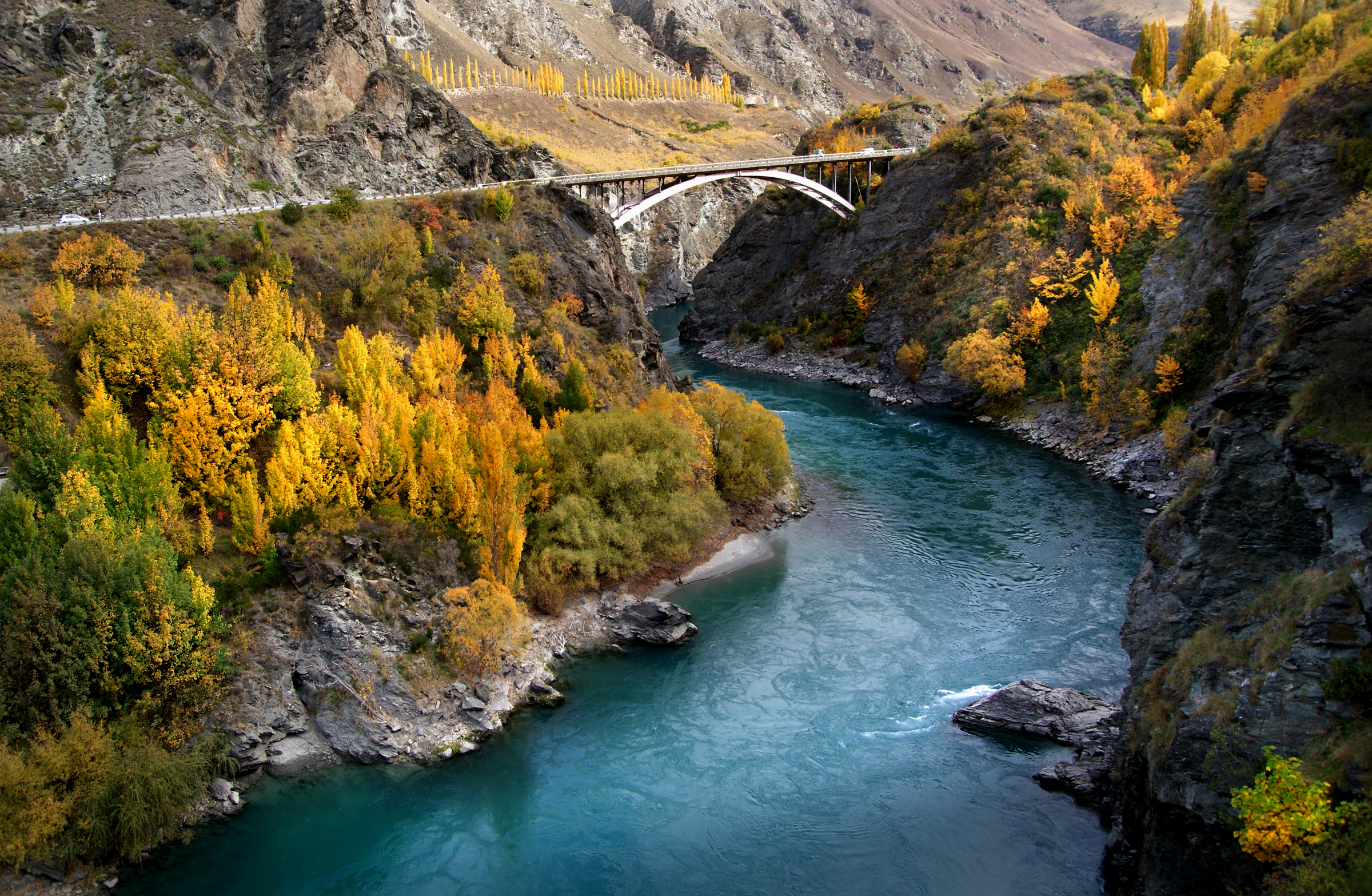
The new highway bridge over the Kawarau River

The Kawarau Gorge Suspension Bridge spans the Kawarau River in the Otago region in the South Island of New Zealand. The bridge is mainly used for commercial purposes by the AJ Hackett Bungy Company for bungy jumping – the world's first commercial bungy jumping site. The bridge carries walkers, runners and bikers on the Queenstown Trail over the river.

== Location ==
The bridge is in a Department of Conservation reserve, between the start of the Crown Range Road and Gibbston in the Kawarau Gorge within the Wakatipu Basin. It is 43 metres (141 ft) above the Kawarau River.

== History ==
The bridge was designed by Harry Higginson. The bridge was completed in late 1880 as a key access route to the Central Otago goldfields. Traffic was moved to a new highway bridge on State Highway 6 in 1963.

The suspension bridge is classified by the New Zealand Historic Places Trust as a Category I historic place. Today, it is a tourist attraction with commercialised ziplines and bungee jumping.

== Name ==
The bridge's many names include the Kawarau Gorge Suspension Bridge, Kawarau Suspension Bridge, Kawarau bridge, Kawarau Bungy Bridge. The Civil Aviation Authority refers to the bridge as Bungy Bridge, which serves as a reporting point for general aviation aircraft approaching Queenstown Airport.

== Gallery ==
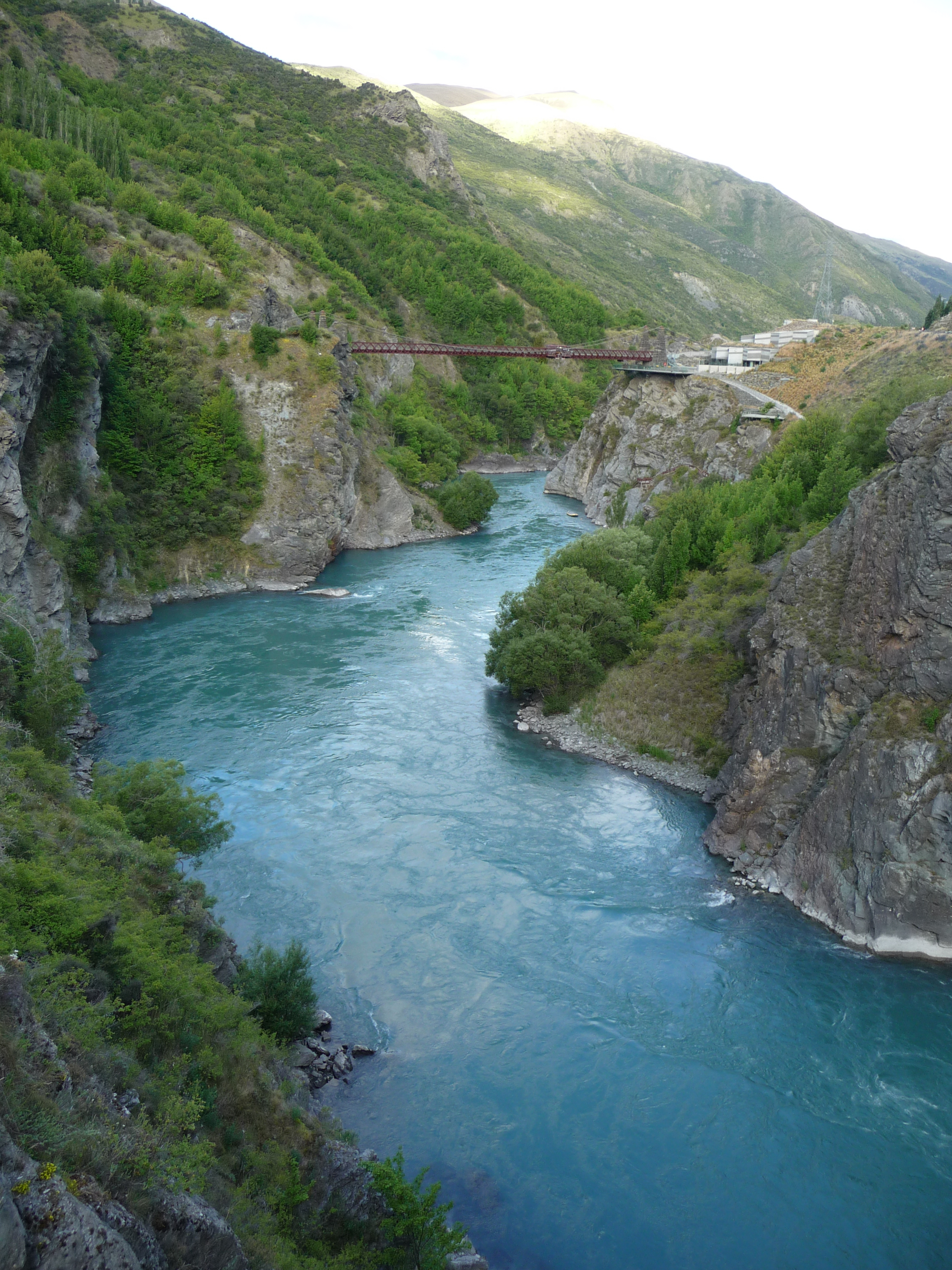
View of the old suspension bridge above the Kawarau River

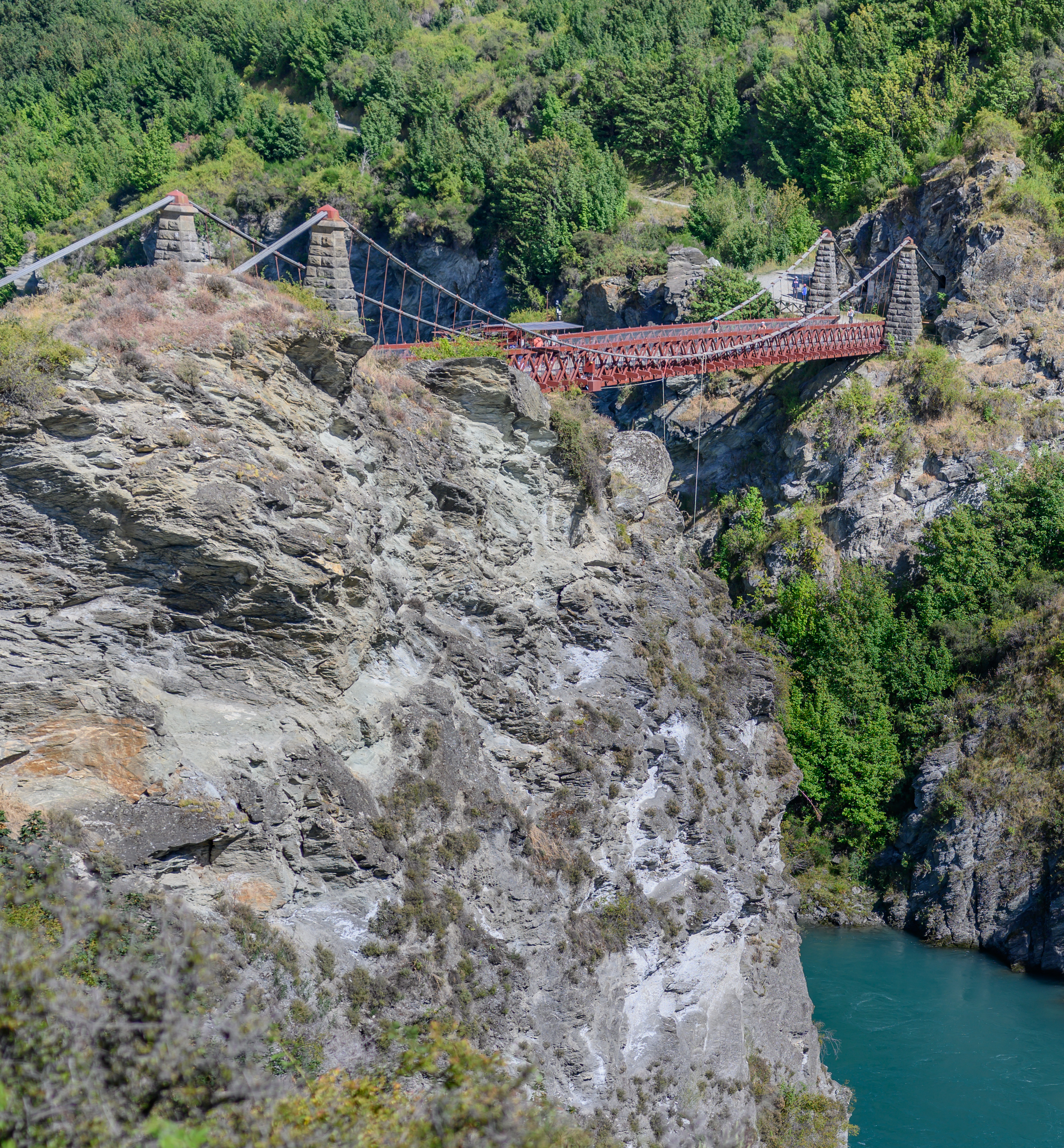
The old Kawarau Gorge Suspension Bridge

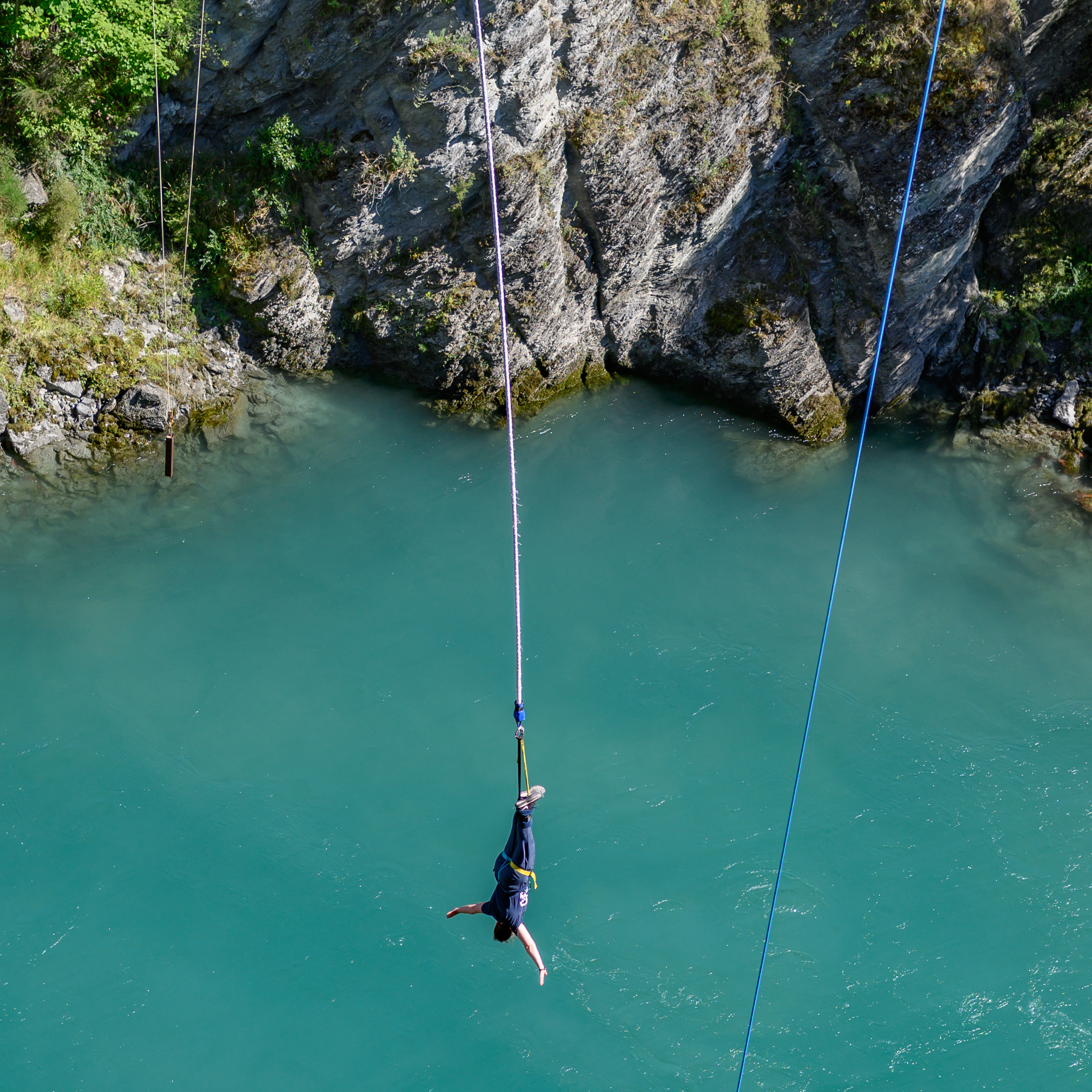
Bungee jumping from the old Kawarau Gorge Suspension Bridge
