= Cerius =

Scientific classification
- Domain: Eukaryota
- Kingdom: Animalia
- Phylum: Arthropoda
- Class: Insecta
- Order: Coleoptera
- Suborder: Polyphaga
- Infraorder: Cucujiformia
- Family: Anthribidae
- Subfamily: Anthribinae
- Genus: Cerius; Holloway, 1982

Genus of beetles

Cerius is a genus of beetles belonging to the family Anthribidae.

The species of this genus are found in New Zealand.

Species:

- Cerius otagensis Holloway, 1982
- Cerius triregius Holloway, 1982
