= Pacuare River =

River in Costa Rica

Pacuare
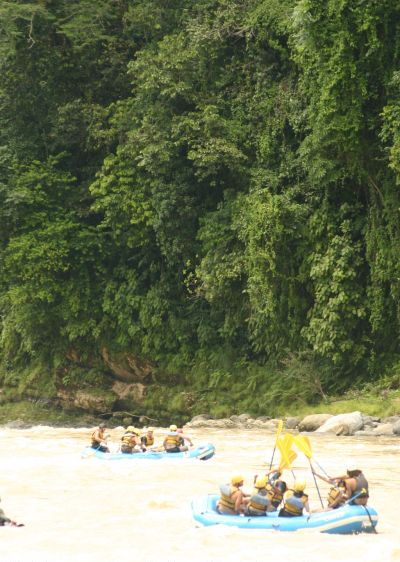
- Pacuare River

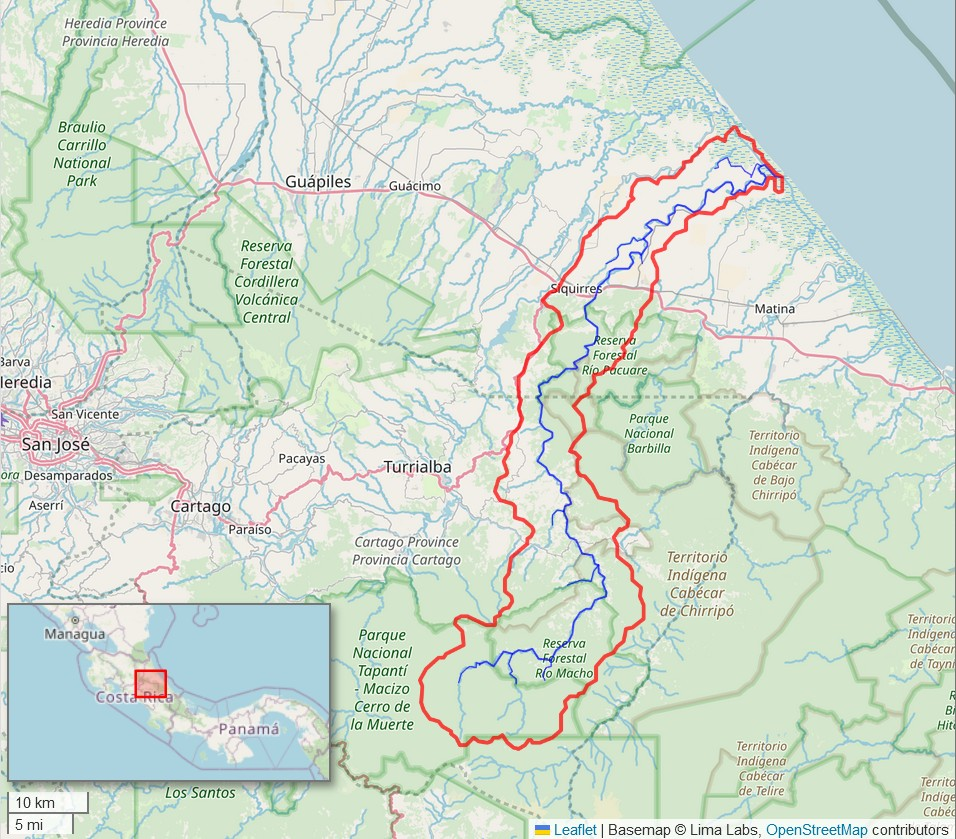
- Map of the Pacuare River watershed

Location
- Country: Costa Rica
- City: Siquirres

Physical characteristics
- Source
  - location: Talamanca, Costa Rica
  - coordinates: 9.611, -83.636
- Mouth
  - location: Caribbean Sea, Costa Rica
  - coordinates: 10.22, -83.28
  - elevation: sea level
- Length: 129 km (80 mi)
- Basin size: 900 km^{2}

Basin features
- Tributaries
  - left: Rio San Rafael, Rio Plantanillo, Rio Pacayitas, Quebrada Grande, Rio Siquirres
  - right: Rio Madre de Dios

The Pacuare River, or the Río Pacuare, in Costa Rica has its source in the Cordillera de Talamanca and flows approximately 108 kilometres (67 mi) to the Caribbean. It is a popular location for white water rafting, whitewater kayaking, and riverboarding. The rainforests that surround the river are home to exotic animal species such as jaguars, monkeys, ocelots, and a very large number of birds. It was considered one of the 5 nicest rivers to practice rafting.

The Instituto Costarricense de Electricidad - Costa Rica's state-owned electricity agency - suggested in 1986 the possibility of building a hydroelectric dam on the river. This plan was finally rejected in 2005 due to concerns about the pollution and other impacts on tourism and the ecology of the river and its surroundings.

== River Sections ==
The Pacuare River is divided into approximately sixteen sections. Starting from the top the three commonly run sections are known as The Upper Upper, The Upper, and The Lower.

=== The Upper Upper Section ===
This run is approximately 16 miles (26 km) long and contains numerous class II through IV rapids. This section is commonly run due to the logistics necessary to reach the put-in. This section can be rafted and kayaked.

=== The Upper Section ===
This more technical section consists of approximately ten miles of whitewater including multiple class IV and V rapids as well as waterfalls. The take-out for this section is Finca la Cruz. This section is most commonly run in creeking style whitewater kayaks.

=== The Lower Section ===
This is the section of class III and IV whitewater that the Pacuare River is most known for. Flowing approximately 37 kilometres (23 mi) (and dropping approximately 370 metres (1,200 ft)) from Finca La Cruz to the town of Siquirres. The run can be done in a single day trip or as long as a three-day trip. The highlights of this section include the whitewater rapids and the waterfalls that flow into the river in the Huacas River Gorge. The rapids include Upper and Lower Huacas (class IV), Doible Drop (class III), Cimarones (class IV) as well as multiple giant falls known around the world.

== History ==
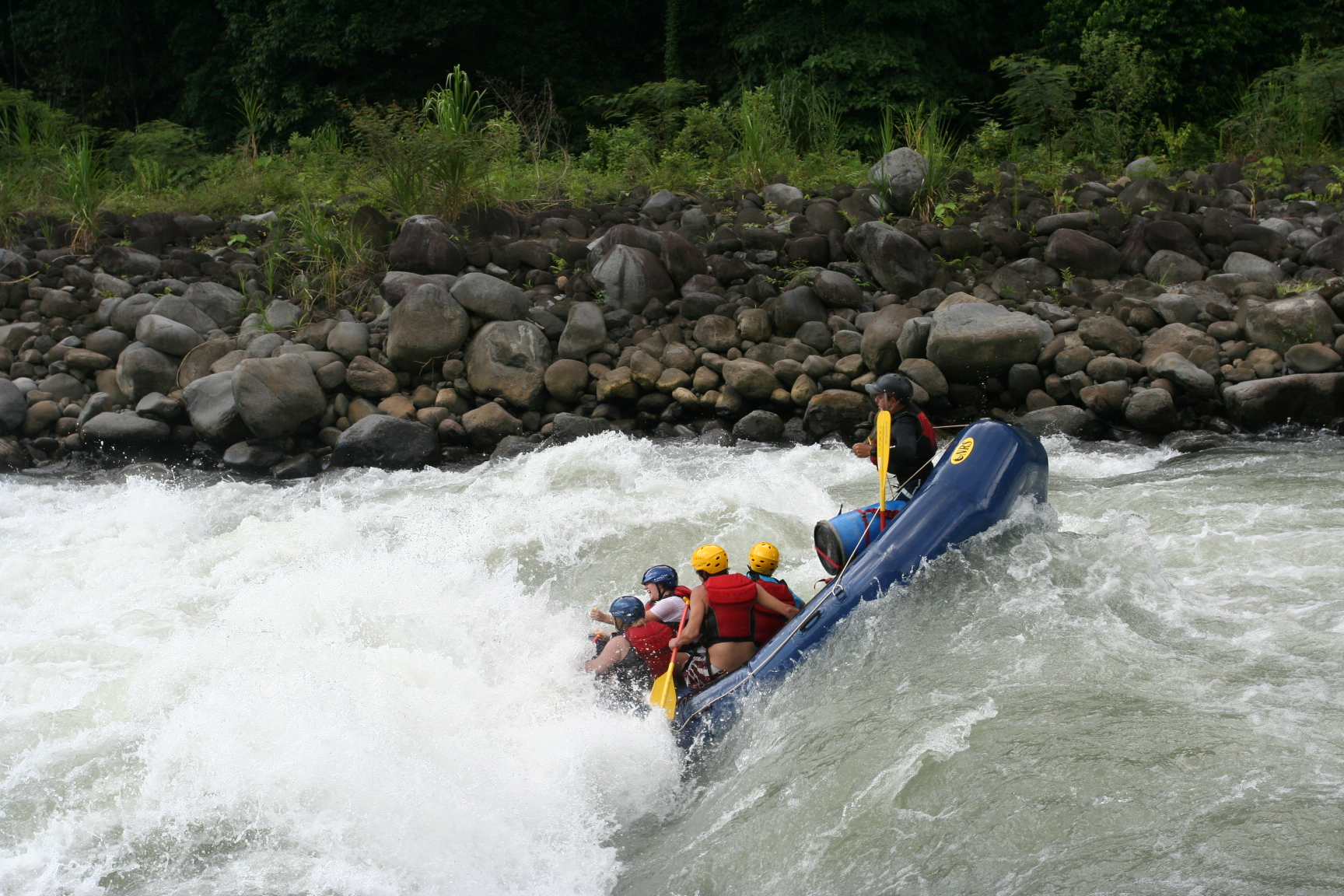
Rafting on the Pacuare River, one of the main adventure activities of tourism in Costa Rica.

The first known river running of the Pacuare was done by a group of Polish kayakers traveling the length of Central America on their way to South America in the winter of 1980/81. The first rafting expedition was in Feb 1981 and the party was composed of Nick Hershenow, Sharon Hester, Jerry Kaufman (all USA), and Rudy Koller (Canada). Sharon Hester and Nick Hershenow were rafting guides for Michael Kaye of CREAR. This expedition used a 3.7 metres (12 ft) Avon Redshank and Rudy mostly kayaked in a Holloform. The trip was divided into the "Upper and "Lower" sections starting at a bridge crossing and took 5 days to reach the narrow gauge railroad where they flagged a train back to San Jose. In 1978 Kaye started Costa Rica Expeditions to run commercial trips in Costa Rica and started running commercial trips on the Pacuare river in winter 1981/82. Between 1980(?) and 1983 Rafael Gallo, a previous employee of Kaye at Costa Rica Expeditions, gathered four rafts and started the company Rios Tropicales. Aventuras Naturales joined the list of commercial rafting companies on the Pacuare River in the mid-1980s. 1986 saw Tico's River Adventures started in Turrialba, the closest city to the Pacuare River.

In 1998 the nearby Reventazon River was dammed pushing more people and the local rafting companies to shift focus to primarily the Pacuare River.

== Flora and fauna ==
Large cats have been spotted near the river but as always these animals are elusive. A black panther was spotted approximately 2 kilometres (1.2 mi) from the river in 1986. Jaguars have been spotted near the Haucas River Gorge.

Anteaters are common as well as raccoons, river otters, iguanas, capuchin monkeys, and sloths. Howler monkeys are found on the lower sections after the Dos Montanas canyon.

There are five common snakes found in the area. The venomous ones include the coral snake, the bushmaster, and fer-de-lance. The laura and sopy lota (long black snake that eats venomous snakes) are also common in the area.

The blue morpho is the most popular butterfly of the area.

The chestnut-mandibled toucan is most commonly seen when it is raining or foggy on the river. Parakeets can sometimes be seen after the Dos Montanas canyon. Other common birds of the area are the orependula (oriel), king fisher, tiger and blue heron, hawks, osprey, king vulture, sunbittern, and snowy egret.

Most of the river corridor is first generation rain forest and has never been touched. Common trees of the area include the sabe tree, the national tree of Guatemala, as well as the red Indio desnudo (naked Indian tree).

After Dos Montanas, the heart of palm, coconut palm, and banana trees become very prominent.
