= Riverboarding =

Boardsport

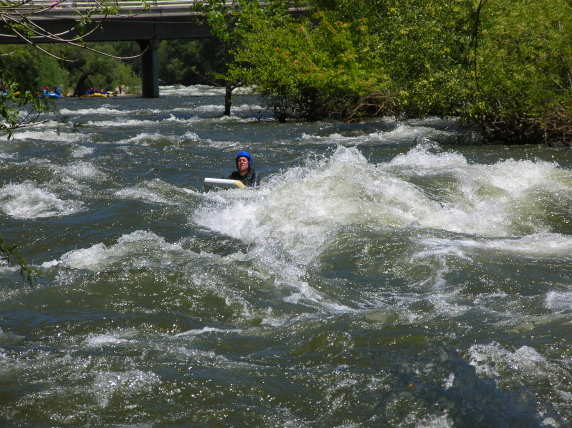
A riverboarder floats down the Kern River at about 110 m^{3}/s (4,000 cu ft/s).

Riverboarding is a boardsport in which the participant lies prone on their board with fins on their feet for propulsion and steering. This sport is also known as hydrospeed in Europe and as riverboarding or white-water sledging in New Zealand, depending on the type of board used. Riverboarding includes commercial, recreational and the swiftwater rescue practice of using a high-flotation riverboard, designed for buoyancy in highly aerated water.

== Origins ==
Riverboarding is believed to have originated in the late 1970s. It is claimed to have originated in France, where raft guides stuffed a burlap mail sack with life vests and went down rapids. Soon, riders adapted a personal submarine shell for their molds, and the plastic version of the riverboard was born. Sometime in the 1980s, Robert Carlson began running rivers in California, U.S.A. using an ocean bodyboard. Soon after he modified this design to be thicker, longer, with four handles. Later in 1986, Ged Hay began taking his body board down the Kawarau River near Queenstown while on his days off as a rafting guide.

European riders also developed a foam version (called a hydrospeed) of the plastic board to reduce weight and avoid injuring each other during collisions that sometimes resulted from one rider travelling downstream and another facing upstream while surfing a hydraulic. Today, homemade foam hydrospeeds are found primarily among European riders. A growing sport in North America, riverboarding has grown in popularity from media exposure and the emergence of commercial operators running riverboard trips.

== Equipment ==
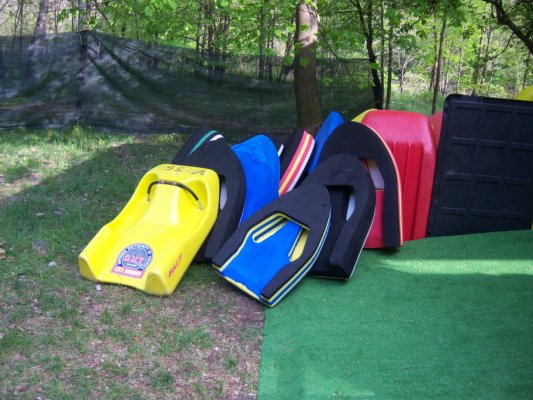
Hydrospeed

Riverboarders typically wear fins to provide the thrust to navigate in river currents, while a personal flotation device provides additional buoyancy. Wetsuits, booties and helmets are worn as protection from the cold and from rocks. Additionally, shin guards, gloves, knee pads, thigh pads, and elbow pads are sometimes worn for extra protection on shallow rivers. Instruction, board design, and gear continue to improve, making riverboarding safer and opening up the possibilities of rapids that can be run on a riverboard and new tricks that can be performed while surfing on the belly.

== Rescue use ==
In rescue use, the board is used to support both rescuer and victim in the water during rescue. The rider must engage both mind and body—thinking about the best way to go down a river while using their fins for the propulsion to get out of harm's way. Riverboards can offer rescuers a valuable chase option to access victims swept downstream who may not be accessed by hand or rope.

== Rivers ==
Several companies operate riverboarding or sledging excursions in New Zealand near Queenstown, Wānaka, and Rotorua. Several companies also operate guided riverboard trips in the United States near Missoula, Montana; Sacramento, California; Bend, Oregon, and eastern Tennessee. In South America, river boarding is popular on the Rio Fonce in San Gil, Colombia. One company based in Voss, Norway, offers riverboarding in several rivers in the area. In Europe the Soca river in Slovenia is a notable location with more extreme options available for more experienced riders. In Canada, the Lachine rapids, on the Saint-Lawrence river near Montreal, boarding is also offered. A commercial riverboarding operation commenced on the Tully River in Queensland, Australia, in 2014.

== Records ==
Mike McVey currently holds the record for the tallest waterfall riverboarded with his descent of the 31-meter (101 ft) tall Metlako falls on Eagle Creek in Oregon. Mike Horn previously held the record for the tallest waterfall riverboarded with his descent of a 22-meter (72 ft) tall waterfall on the upper reaches of the Pacuare River at Costa Rica.

== See also ==
- American River (North, Middle, and South Forks)
- Clark Fork River
- Kawarau River
- Kern River
- Truckee River
