= Kawarau River =

River in the South Island of New Zealand

Coordinates: 45°03′S 169°12′E

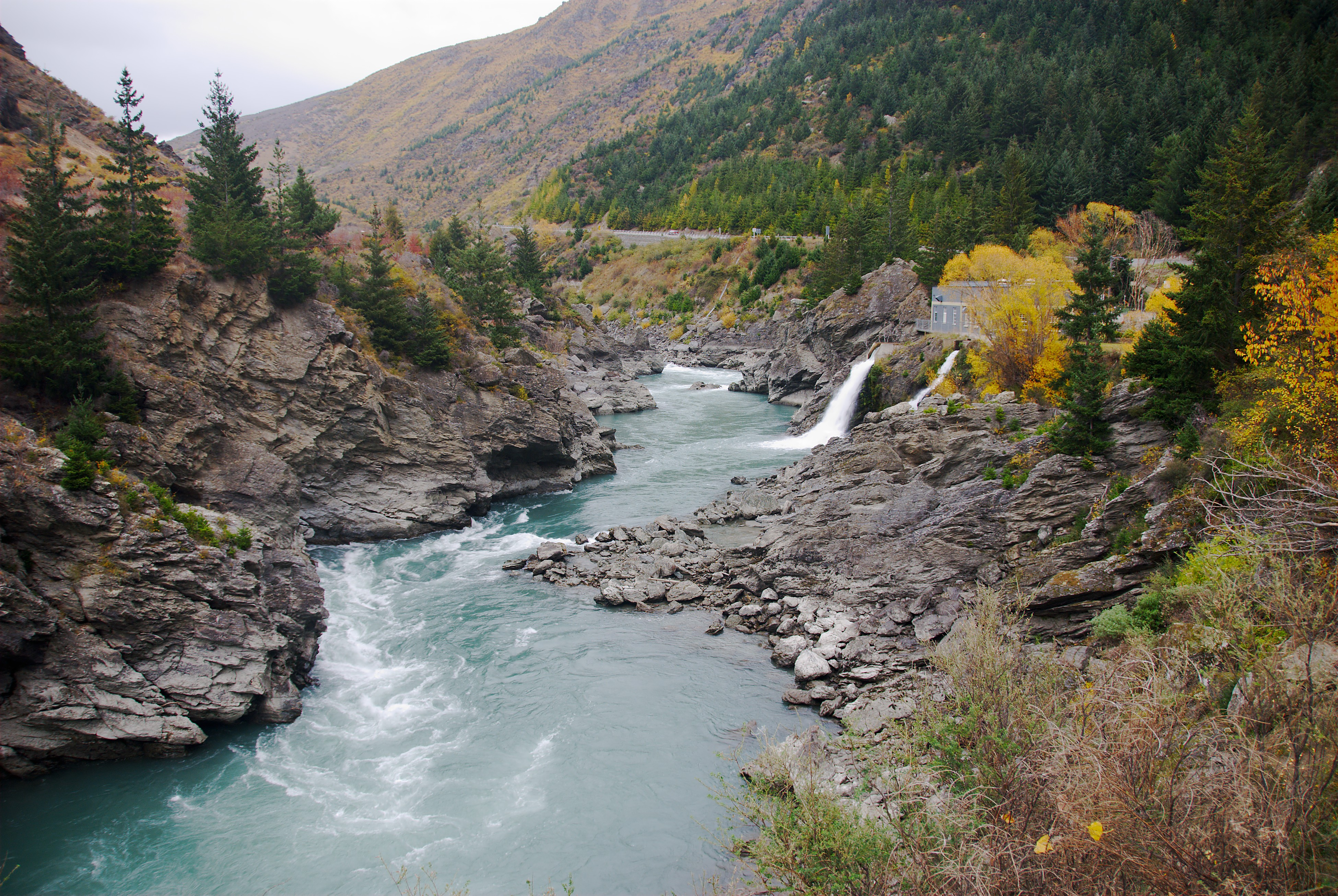
- Kawarau River with Roaring Meg hydro station

Location
- Country: New Zealand
- Region: Otago

Physical characteristics
- Source
  - location: Lake Wakatipu
- Mouth
  - location: Lake Dunstan
- Length: 60 km (37 mi)

The Kawarau River is a river in the South Island of New Zealand. It drains Lake Wakatipu in northwestern Otago via the lake's Frankton Arm. The river flows generally eastwards for about 60 kilometres (37 mi) and passes through the steep Kawarau Gorge until it joins Lake Dunstan near Cromwell. Before the construction of the Clyde High Dam, the Kawarau joined the Clutha River / Mata-Au in a spectacular confluence at Cromwell. The Shotover River enters the Kawarau from the north; the Nevis River enters it from the south. With many rapids and strong currents, the river can be dangerous and has claimed many lives. It is popular for bungy jumping and kayaking.

A natural bridge, Whatatorere, where the river narrows to 1.2 metres (3.9 ft), was important first to early Māori and then to goldminers as the only place the Mata-Au and the Kawarau could be crossed without boats. Māori were heading for the Cardrona Valley to reach Wānaka, and on to the Haast Pass to seek pounamu. The miners were seeking gold in the Arrow Goldfields.

Now the main road to Queenstown, State Highway 6, runs through the Kawarau Gorge.

== Name ==
Kawarau is a Māori name meaning "channel between rocks or shoals". It shares its name with the mountain range at its source.

It is pronounced 'ka wa ro', and has its etymological roots in the Waitaha or southern dialect of Māori. It should not be confused with the Bay of Plenty town of Kawerau.

The falls where the river leaves Whakatipu Waimāori are called Ōterotu.

== History ==
For Ngāi Tahu, the river was the main travel route from the Mata-Au to Lake Wakatipu. A key feature was the narrow gorge at Whatatorere or Pōtiki-whata-rumaki-nao, the only place where the Kawarau and Mata-Au rivers could be leapt over. It connected to a route over the Crown Range and on to the Cardrona Valley that led to the West Coast.

In the 19th century, alluvial gold was extracted from the river. The Goldfields Mining Centre, downstream of the gorge, features a working exhibition of 19th century gold mining techniques. Some of the miners' huts remain today, many of them close to thriving vineyards.

In 1924 a company was formed to drain the river by blocking off Lake Wakatipu, with the intent of then collecting gold from the river bed. Ten massive gates were completed in 1927 and although the river level dropped it was not laid bare as planned. The gates formed part of State Highway 6 until December 2017, when a larger $22 million replacement bridge was completed.

== Water Conservation Order ==
A water conservation order was set up in March 1997, seven years after the minister of conservation first applied for an agreement to prevent hydroelectric dams from being built in the Kawarau river or its tributaries.

The Order covers the stretch of river from the Lake Wakatipu control gates to Scrubby Stream. Fish and Game has sought an amendment to the Water Conservation Order to prevent any damming of the Nevis River and to seek conditions on changes to the minimum flows.

== Adventure tourism ==
The first European to visit the area was Nathanael Chalmers, who was guided inland by Chiefs Reko and Kaikōura in 1853. Reko and Kaikōura showed Chalmers the rock bridge Whatatorere at Roaring Meg, which was the only place that the Kawarau River could be crossed, and returned him down the river on a mōkihi, a flax reed open kayak. In 1910, 57 years after the event, Nathanael Chalmers remembered his boat trip through the Cromwell Gorge: ‘I shall never forget the “race” through the gorge ... my heart was literally in my mouth, but those two old men seemed to care nothing for the current.’

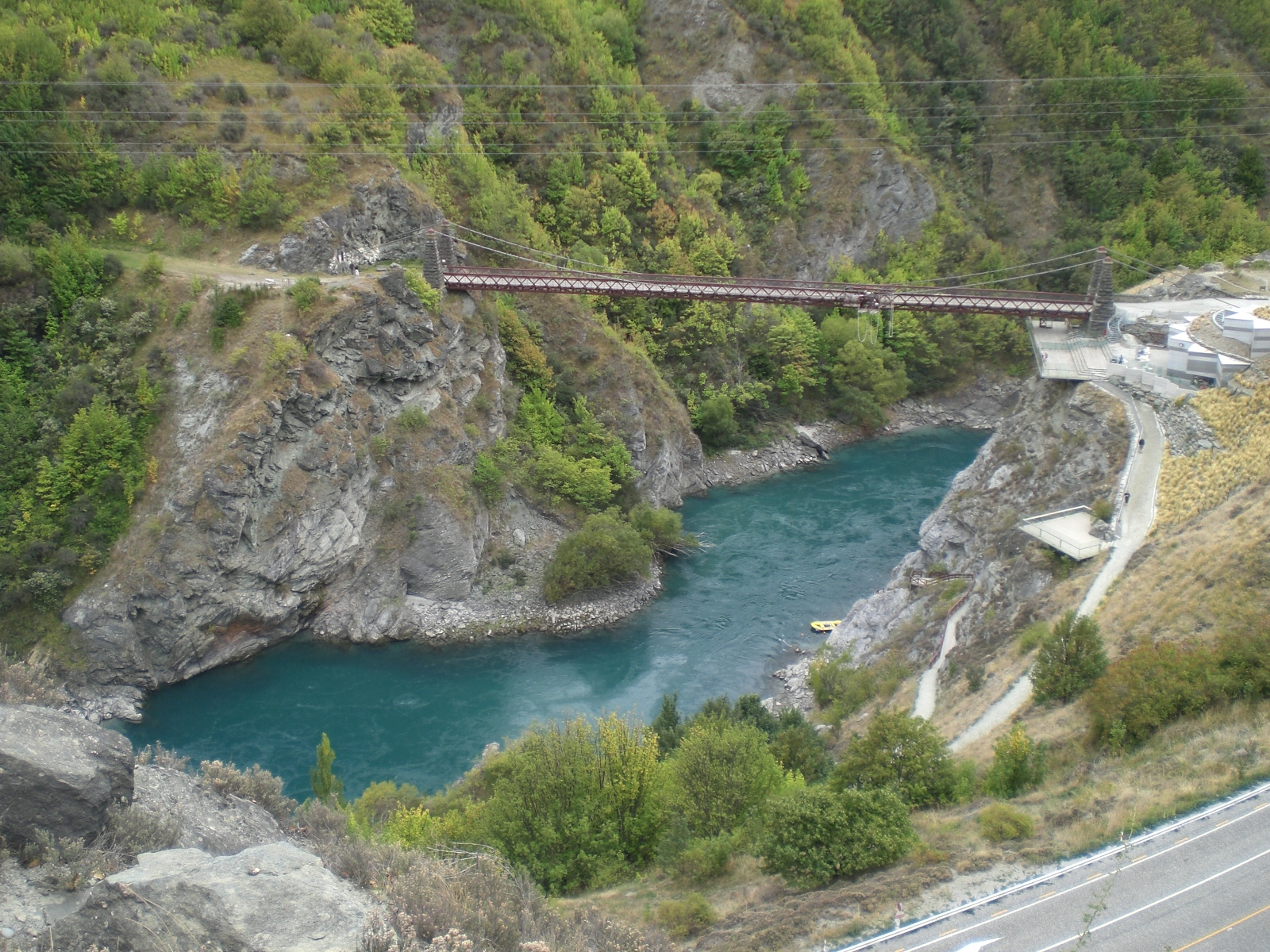
Kawarau Bridge Bungy, the world's first commercial bungy site. (A. J. Hackett Bungy Centre on the right)

More recent tourist adventure activities on the river include riverboarding, jet boating, white water rafting, river surfing, and bungy jumping. The Kawarau Gorge Suspension Bridge, 43 metres (141 ft) above the river, and a Category I historic place, is the site of the world's first commercial bungy jumping operation. Eastburn Station gave up the 1.2 square kilometres (300 acres) plus that forms the natural backdrop as a reserve.

The Kawarau is the largest volume river commercially rafted in New Zealand, with an average flow of 216 cubic metres per second (7,600 cu ft/s) at Chards Road measuring station. The four significant commercially used rapids on the river are Smiths Falls, Twin Bridges, Do Little Do Nothing and the 400-metre (1,300 ft) Chinese Dog Leg. Below these are the dangerous Nevis Bluff, Citroen, Retrospect, and Roaring Meg sections. Because of the danger Waitiri Station usually declines access.

== In popular culture ==
The Kawarau featured as a setting for the Argonath in the 2001 motion picture, The Lord of the Rings: The Fellowship of the Ring.

The Kawarau appeared on the finale of the Israeli reality show HaMerotz LaMillion 1.

Frederick John Cato of the firm Moran & Cato, was a teacher from Invercargill, New Zealand, where he met and married Frances Bethune. Kawarau was the name they gave their expansive home in Hawthorn East, Victoria.

== Bridges ==
Bridges that pass over the Kawarau River are:

- Kawarau Gorge Suspension Bridge
- Kawarau River Bridge
- Kawarau River (Victoria) Bridge
- Kawarau Falls Bridge
- Bridge at the Goldfields Mining Centre

Until it was destroyed in the 19th century, the natural rock bridge "Whatatorere" at Roaring Meg was the only place that the Kawarau River or Clutha River could be crossed without boats.

== See also ==
- List of rivers of New Zealand
