= María Estefanía Dávalos y Maldonado =

Ecuadorian sculptor and painter (1725–1801)

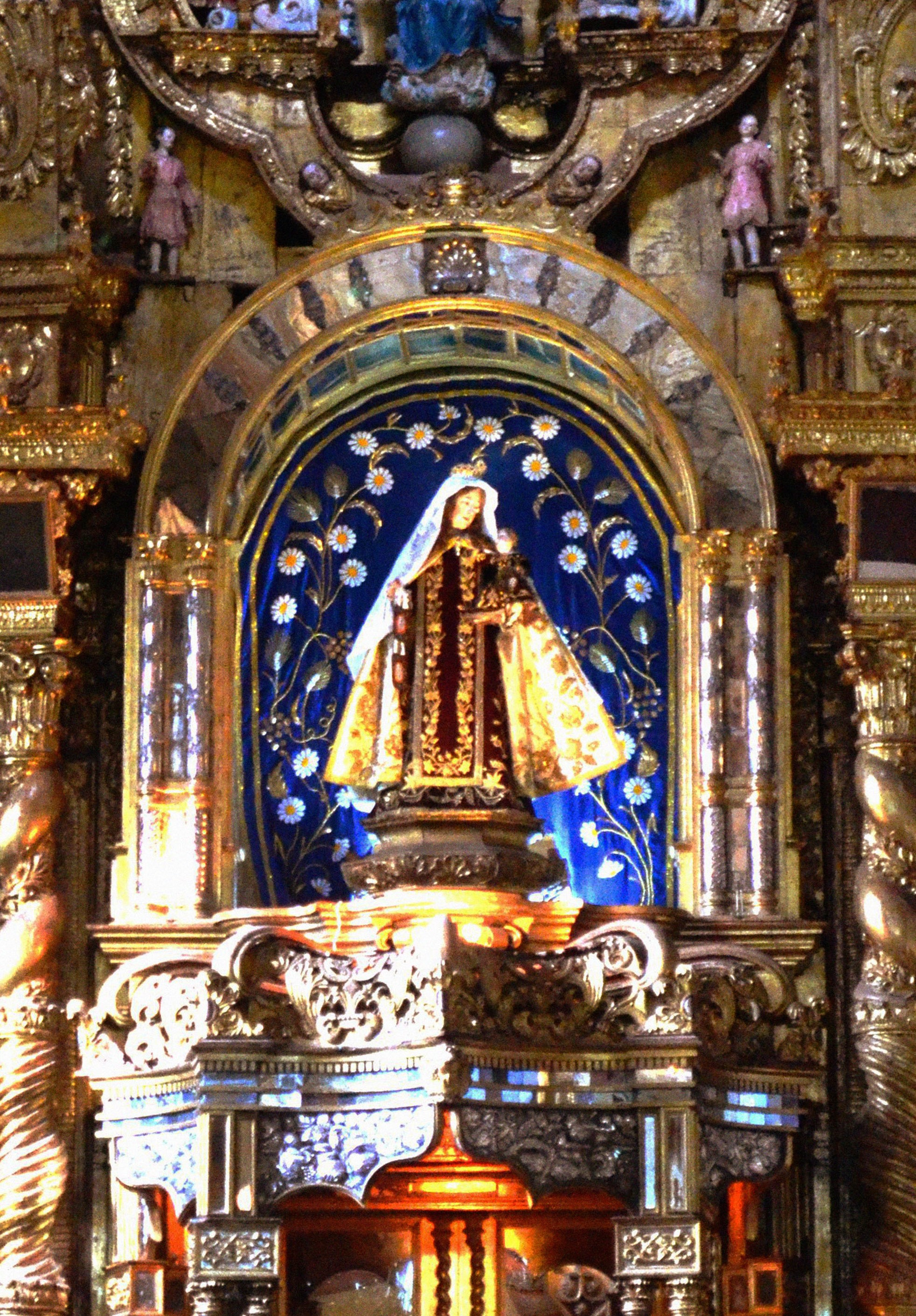
- Virgen del Carmen carved by María Estefanía Dávalos y Maldonado
- Born: January 5, 1725; Chimborazo, Ecuador
- Died: Quito, Ecuador
- Movement: Quito School

María Estefanía Dávalos y Maldonado (January 5, 1725 in Chimborazo – Quito, c. 1801) was an Ecuadorian sculptor and painter. She was a part of the Quito School of the 18th century.

Her most famous work is La Virgen del Carmen, a sculpture located in a monastery in Ecuador. Her first known work is La conversión de San Pablo, which she painted around 1738.

== Biography ==
Her parents were the general José Dávalos Sotomayor y Villagómez and Rosa Elena Maldonado Sotomayor. She was born in the Chimborazo Province of Ecuador. Her sister was Magdalena Dávalos y Maldonado and she was the niece of Pedro Vicente Maldonado.

== See also ==
- Isabel de Santiago
