= Center for Advanced Studies on Puerto Rico and the Caribbean =

Private research institute in Old San Juan, Puerto Rico

Coordinates: 18.466702°N 66.118767°W

- Centro de Estudios Avanzados de Puerto Rico y el Caribe
- Institutional logo
- Other name: Centro de Estudios Avanzados
- Motto: ¡Estudia lo que te apasiona!
- Type: Graduate Studies, Private not-for-profit
- Established: 1976; 50 years ago
- Founder: Dr. Ricardo E. Alegría Gallardo
- Rector: Laura M. Gorbea-Díaz
- Academic staff: 34
- Students: 350 (0 undergraduate)
- Location: Manuel Fernández Juncos Avenue, San Juan, Puerto Rico
- Language: Spanish
- Website: ceaprc.edu
- Former Municipal Penitentiary of Puerta de Tierra
- U.S. Historic district – Contributing property
- U.S. National Historic Landmark District – Contributing property
- Part of: Old San Juan Historic District (ID72001553 & ID13000284)

Significant dates
- Designated CP: October 10, 1972
- Designated NHLDCP: February 27, 2013

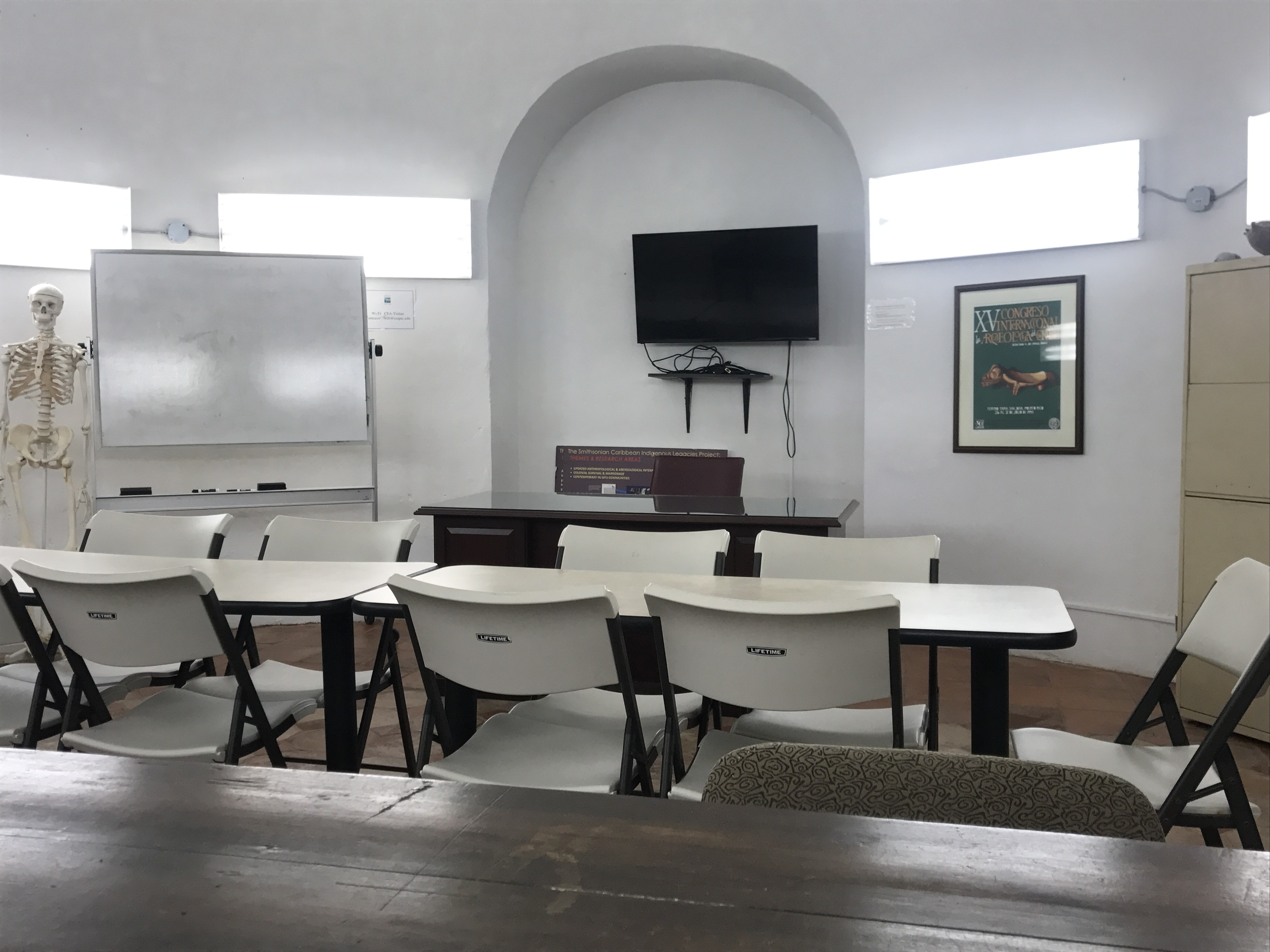
Interior view of the institution's archaeological laboratory.

The Center for Advanced Studies on Puerto Rico and the Caribbean (Spanish: Centro de Estudios Avanzados de Puerto Rico y El Caribe or simply CEAPRC) is a private institute housed in the former Municipal Penitentiary of Puerta de Tierra, San Juan, Puerto Rico, that offers graduate studies in arts and philosophy. The center is accredited by the Middle States Commission on Higher Education and it publishes La Revista del Centro de Estudios Avanzados de Puerto Rico y el Caribe.

== History ==
=== Under Ricardo Alegría ===
It was incorporated on February 28, 1968, by Pablo Casals, Luis Muñoz Marín, Roberto Busó Carrasquillo, and Jaime Benítez. However, it remained inactive and without organization until 1976, when Ricardo Alegría made a request before the Council on Higher Education of Puerto Rico to transform the center into an academic institution.

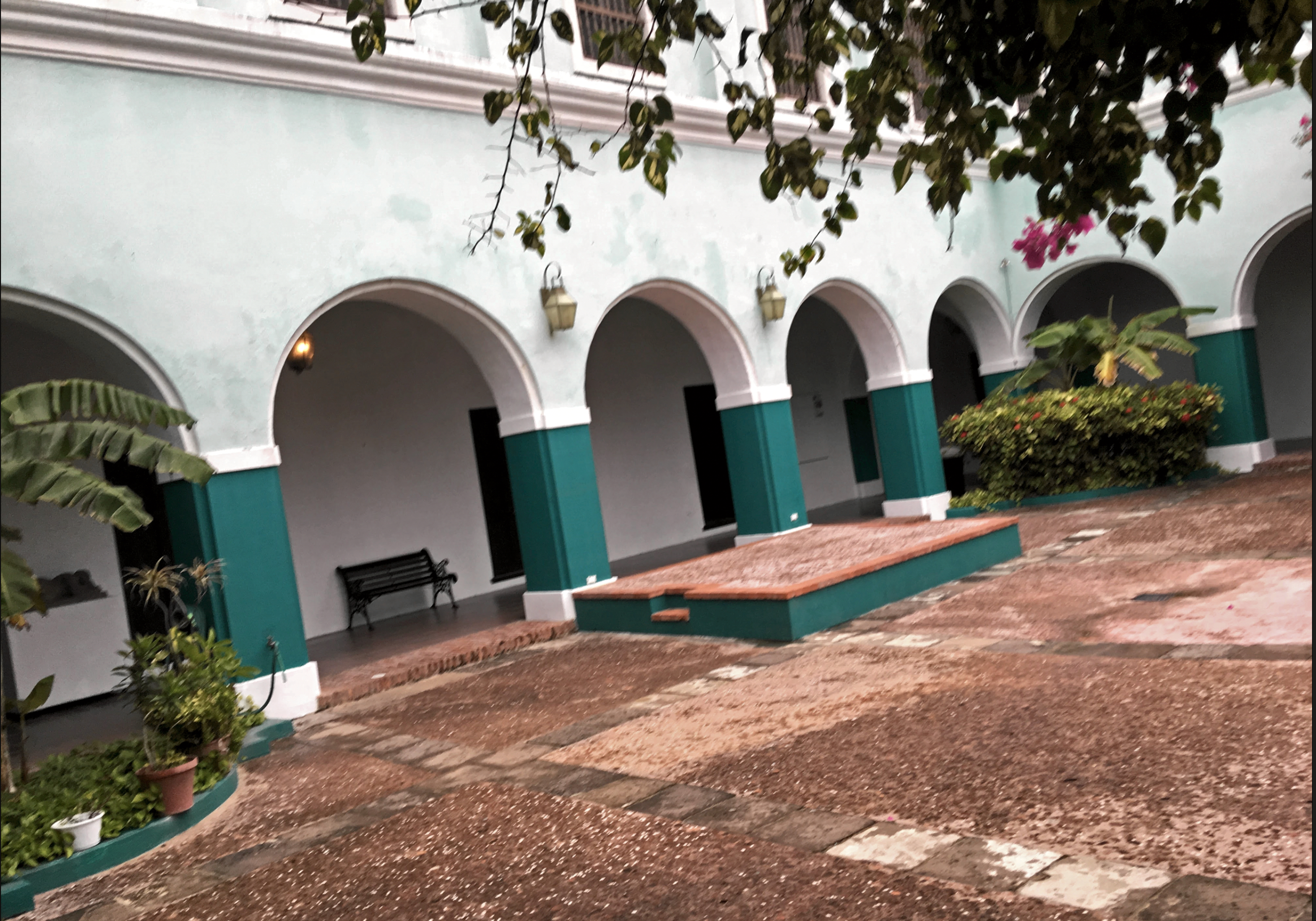
The interior courtyard of the Center for Advanced Studies on Puerto Rico and the Caribbean.

With the CEAPRC, Alegría intended for a small institution that possessed an intimate environment, with intellectual growth and the promotion of a region-wide Caribbean emphasis as its focus. In her 2002 book, Carmen Dolores Hernández credited the CEAPRC (which she labels an "experimental" institution "unparalleled in the island or the Antilles") with breaking away from the "cultural euro centrism" of higher education in Puerto Rico. The curriculum was intended to be different from that of the universities. Puerto Rico and the Antilles received a central role with historic archeology, local literature and history in the spotlight. Besides numerous local sites, archeological digs were also held by students in the Dominican Republic and Cuba. Foreign professors such as Irving Rouse, Peter Roe, Mario Veloz Maggiolo, Sally Price and Lourdes Domínguez also collaborated with the CEAPRC. Students were allowed to take courses from other universities. On at least one occasion, a course was added due to student initiative.

The institution has had collaboration agreements with Universidad San Carlos (Guatemala), Universidad Autónoma (Dominican Republic, which included joint work with professors José Alcántara Almánzar, Pedro Vergés, Carlos Andújar and Marcio Veloz Maggiolo) and Universidad de Veracruz (Mexico). The classes of Puerto Rican Literature and History, Puerto Rican Society, Puerto Rican the Caribbean during the XX Century and Puerto Rican Culture were mandatory, while several electives involving literature, cinema, racial studies, law, Arts and other practices were offered. The CEAPRC's faculty worked on a contractual basis, allowing a revolving door of professors to come and go. During its early years it grew to include figures like Arturo Morales Carrión, José Arsenio Torres, Juan Rodríguez Cruz, Eugenio Fernández Méndez, Luis Díaz Soler, José Ramón de la Torre, María Teresa Babín, Carmelo Rosario Natal, Carmen M. Ramos de Santiago, Francisco López Cruz, Lidio Cruz Monclova, Andrés Sánchez Tarniella, Ernesto Jaime Ruíz de la Mata—a member of the short-lived surrealist group El Mirador Azul, Edgar Martínez Masdeu, Gervasio García, Arturo Santana, Héctor Campos Parsi, Luis Nieves Falcón and Esther Melón. Local figures such as Mela Pons (Alegría's wife) and Juan Antonio Corretjer, were involved in hosting conferences. Alegría himself taught the Culture of Puerto Rico course for decades. His work with the CEAPRC reached foreign academics such as Ángel Rama, who on August 10, 1983, noted in a letter that it had been a topic of discussion in a reunion held between him and Maldonado Denia at Paris. During Alegría's tenure as director, the institution had an "open doors" policy. Among those that the CEAPRC has hosted is a chief of the Soshone tribe.

Collaboration with foreign institutions brought the likes of Irving Rouse (Yale), Douglas Newton (Metropolitan Museum), Gordon Willey (Harvard), Jean-Batiste Romain (State University of Haiti), George Kubler (Yale), Nina S. de Friedman (Instituto de Antropología de Colombia), Eduardo Arcila Farías (Colegio de México), William Bascom (University of California), Manuel Moreno Fraginals (Universidad de la Havana), Wande Abimbola (University of Ife), Carlos Rama (Universidad de Barcelona) and Manuel García Arévalo (Universidad Nacional de Santo Domingo). Since then, Ángel López Cantós, Antonio Lorente, Pedro Vergés, Lourdes Domínguez, Lorenzo Rubio, Jesús Urrea, Juan Tena Ibarra, Demetrio Ramos, Jorge Febles and Lucio Mijares Pérez, among others have served as invited professors.

The CEAPRC created the slideshows El arte de los aborígenes de Puerto Rico, Las Artes populares de Puerto Rico, La catedral de San Juan, La Capilla del Santo Cristo de la Salud, La Iglesia de San José, El pintor José Campeche and El pintor Francisco Oller Cestero and the short films La vida de Cristo según el santero Florencio Cabán (directed by Amílcar Tirado, winner of the 1979 Golden Eagle Award of the Non-Theatrical Event Council (Spanish: Consejo sobre Eventos Internacionales no Teatrales), Don Tomás, el alfarero de Las Piedras, Juan Alindato y las máscaras de Ponce, Las tejedoras de sombreros de paja de Cabo Rojo, Cuando llegaron los indios de Boriquen, La cestería en Puerto Rico, El Gagá de Similá, Vudú en la República Dominicana, Serie de Maestros Artesanos (José Arsenio Torres) are also part of its collection. All mentions of the Antillean natives by foreign historians were compiled, taking 25 years to complete in the Crónicas de los indios de las Antillas. During the 1976–80 years the ICP grew politicized, while the CEAPRC focused on Puerto Rican culture. In 1978, the CEAC entered alliances with Temple University and the Universidad de Valladolid.

In 1981, Alegría proposed the creation of a student magazine, Caribe, published on a biannual basis. That same year, the Catholic Church sponsored a course about its history at Puerto Rico, Cátedra Juan Alejo Arizmendi. In 1982, Alegría established an exchange collaboration involving the Academia de Ciencias of Cuba. Since the CEAPRC had its own editorial, it published the work of figures like Arturo Morales Carrión, some of the master's thesis and historic documents. Through it Alegría published La vida de Jesucristo según el santero puertorriqueño Florencio Cabán and Primeras representaciones gráficas del indio americano (1493–1523). Other publications include Osiris Delgado's El pintor Francisco Oller y Cestero, Félix Ojeda Reyes' La manigua en París: correspondencia diplomática de Ramón E. Betances and Flor Piñero de Rivera's Arturo Schomburg: un puertorriqueño descubre el legado histórico del negro.

The loan of Casa Blanca by the ICP was of only $1 per year. As the agreement was about to end, rumors circled that the Romero Barceló administration intended to close down the CEAPRC, opposing the frequent presence of political opponents within the premises. The institution had already face budge cuts when the new administration of the ICP objected to give it $6,000 from the Fundación Nacional de las Artes. Alegría, however, warned Rafael Rivera García of the Office of Cultural Affairs that he would have to be ousted from Casa Blanca by the police, but ultimately decided to move after new ICP director Leticia del Rosario intended to raise the loan to recover the $6,000. Having participated in the restoration of the San José Church since 1977, Alegría negotiated the abandoned Seminario Conciliar building for the CEAPRC from cardinal Luis Aponte Martínez, offering to restore it as well (in exchange, the institution didn't have to pay loan for some years, the specific quantity later being revised by a Church appraiser). The estimate of the project was $4,000,000 but Alegría recycled materials from other sources and completed it for $600,000. After the process was completed in November 1986, the CEAPRC moved to the building. The CEAPRC also received donations from citizens for particular uses.

In 1982, it received recognition by the Middle States Association, which was suspicious about the $650 salary that the director (Alegría) was receiving since it was improbable that his successor would agree to that sum. Despite this, Alegría considered the intervention of the federal entity counterintuitive given the topic of study, but allowed it so that the students could receive additional benefits. The restoration of the Seminario Conciliar began in 1984. After moving to its new base, the Aula Magna was used for cultural activities. A program of public conferences on Puerto Rican and Caribbean topics that was opened also held its events there. The old refectory was also converted into an exhibition room. The classrooms were named after figures like Eugenio María de Hostos, Roman Baldorioty de Castro, José Campeche, José Julián Acosta and Alejandro Tapia. In 1985, Alegría began publishing La Revista del Centro de Estudios Avanzados de Puerto Rico y el Caribe, emphasizing an academic approach. The CEAPRC also produced slideshows in collaboration with the Fundación Puertorriqueña de las Humanidades for educational use. By the early 2000s, nine documentaries had been completed. A Middle States evaluation team reviewed the status in 1987, considering the CEAPRC an "institution with [...] a well-defined view of itself" when comparing it to other Universities and colleges. In July 1987, the CEAC collaborated with the Puerto Rican Cultural Heritage House of New York in a course offered from teachers from the diaspora. When interviewed Alegría considered his work at the CEAPRC a continuation of his previous work at the ICP, intending to create the professionals that were needed in the kind of projects that were undertaken there.

In May 1987, a restored chapel was inaugurated within the premises of the CEAPRC. In 1989, Alegría loaned several pieces of his collection for an Antillean masks exhibit. In 1990 Arturo Schomburg and Casa de las Américas exhibits were organized. In 1991, the institution began offering its first doctorate degree. Exhibitions on the archeological work of Miguel Rodríguez and Cuban slavery was also hosted. In 1992, Puerto Rican engravings and several books from the Guillermo Esteves Volckers collection on the topic of Christopher Columbus were exhibited. The Museo de las Américas, inaugurated during this year, was viewed by Alegría as the culmination of his life's work, bringing together several past initiatives. In 1993, the XV International Archeology Congress was held at Puerto Rico. Exhibits on Caribbean archeology and local academic magazines were also held.

In June 1993, budget cuts by the Pedro Rosselló administration ended a yearly legislative donation of $100,000 when the House of Representatives eliminated it after Carlos Juan López Nieves criticized that Alegría was personally involved with the CEAPRC and it had "become [his] business". The director didn't take the claims lightly. The following month, the Senate of Puerto Rico restored $63,000 of the total sum. In 1994, exhibits were held on the topics of Pablo de la Torriente Brau and Puerto Rican children's literature. In 1995, the CEAPRC entered a collaboration with the Universidad de Sevilla to offer a joint doctorate in American History. In 1996, Alegría and Pons loaned several pieces from their Talla de Santos woodwork collection to the Museo de las Américas, as part of the institutions second permanent exhibit. Between 1997 and 1998, the municipalities of Caguas and San Juan offered grants to students. On the 100th anniversary of the Spanish–American War, an exhibit on life before 1898 was held. In 1997, the government eliminated the recurrent UPR donation to the CEAPRC. The following year, the UPR made additional cuts in the collaboration for publications, investigations and visiting professors. In response, Alegría auctioned pieces from his private collection to gather funds, gathering $40,000. In 1999, students from the CEAPRC participated in excavations at Havana.

Entering the new millennium, efforts were made to establish more links with the Dominican Republic and Cuba in the form of exchange programs. For Alegría, this was a cultural response to the concept of an Antillean Confederation. By this time, the CEAPRC's library had grown to include 14,000 books and hosted the Guillermo Esteves Volckers, Rosa Estades and Monelisa Pérez Marchand collections, as well as audiovisual content and documentation. Some effort to modernize the institution's classic work took place with the digitalization of the he Crónicas de los indios de las Antillas initiative.

Alegría left his role in the CEAPRC in 2001, being replaced by Juan Manuel González Lamela as director and Juan Rodríguez Cancel as Dean of Academic Affairs. The institution had an endowment fund of $2,250,000 at the moment. By this time, figures like Juan Manuel García Passalaqua, Enrique Laguerre, Luis De la Rosa, Guillermo Baralt, Blanca Silvestrini, José Ferrer Canales, Ana Sagardía, Federico Acevedo, Ramón Luis Acevedo, Carmen Isabel Raffuci, Antonio J. González and Silvia Álvarez Curbelo had served as professors in the CEAPRC. In April 2001, the government promised an improvement of $100,000 in the assignment to the institution to commemorate Alegría's 80th birthday. The institution was one of 30 that joined in the celebrations surrounding this commemoration.

== Notable members ==
- Enrique Laguerre - emeritus member.
- Ricardo Alegría - considered the founding father.

== Notable alumni ==
- Soraya Aracena - anthropologist and curator
