= Soraya Aracena =

Dominican anthropologist

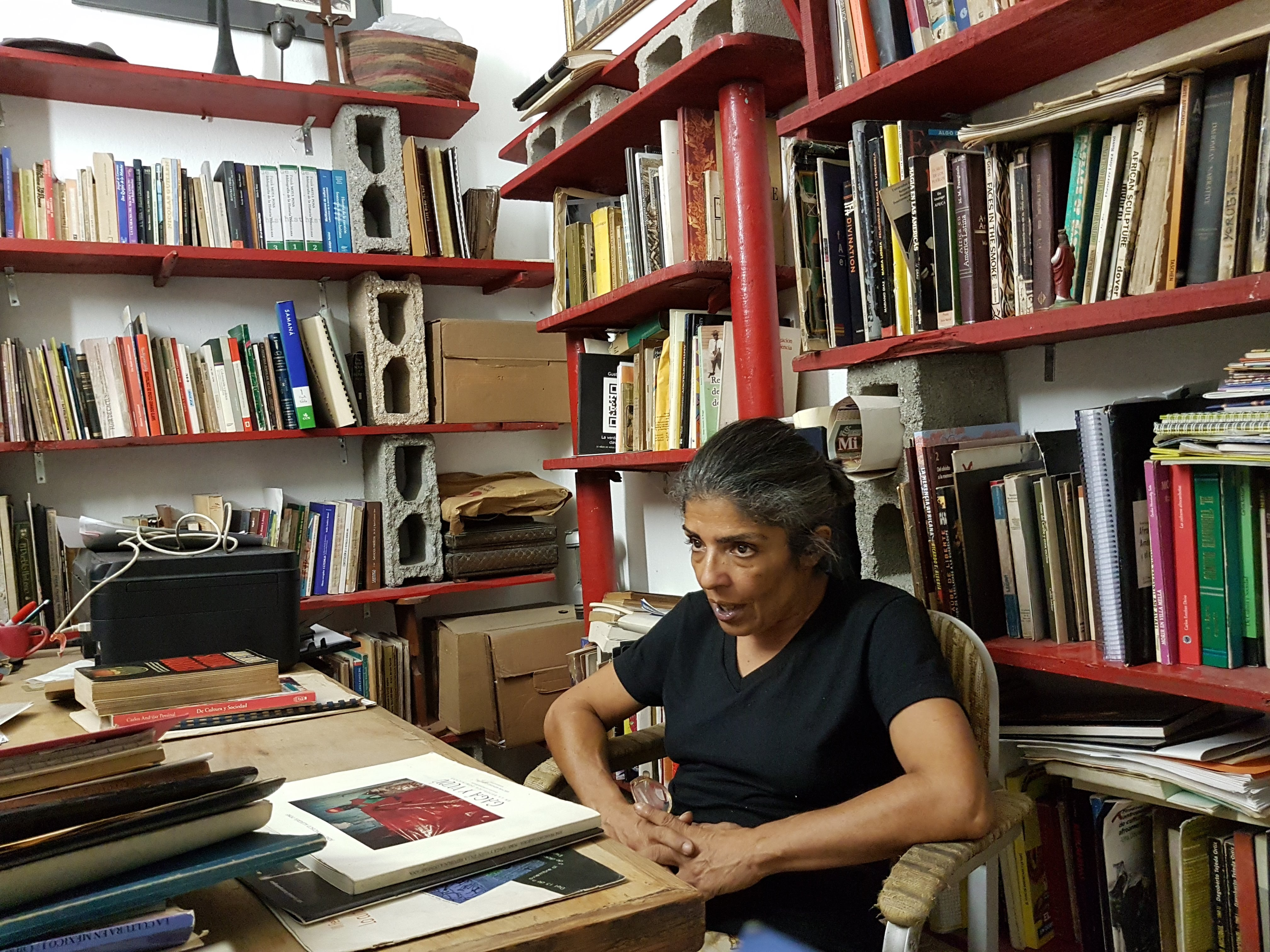
- Citizenship: Dominican Republic
- Education: Centre for Advanced Studies of Puerto Rico and the Caribbean
- Occupations: Anthropologist; curator

Soraya Aracena is an anthropologist and curator from the Dominican Republic, who specialises in the religious and cultural practices of black Caribbean communities. In additional to her research she has also founded cultural festivals and an ethnographic video archive.

== Biography ==
Aracena obtained first studied communication at undergraduate level. She graduated from the MA in Studies of the Greater Antilles from the Centre for Advanced Studies of Puerto Rico and the Caribbean in 1997. In 1990 she worked as part of the team curating Dominican and Haitian artefacts for the creation of the collection of the Museum of the Americas. In 1994, she founded Los Festivales Anthropológicos de Cultura Afroamericanas (The Anthropological Festivals of Afro-American Cultures), which sought to enhance understanding and showcase the importance of black culture in hispanophone Caribbean countries. She also established the Chango Prieto online video library, which records and archives ethnographic material relating to the Dominican Republic.

Known for her research on the black cultural practices in the country, on particular work on Dominican Gagá and its history, Aracena has also worked on traditions associated with St Michael. She was also worked on the role of culinary traditions in diasporic communities. She is also an expert on the history of merengue. Research collaborators have included Jose Francisco Alegria, with whom she undertook field work which led to publication on Dominican Vudú. She has been outspoken on the need for greater recognition of the archaeologist Fernando Morbán Laucer's work in Dominican archaeology, especially at the Cueva de las Maravillas National Park.

In 2022, she was a member of the judging panel for the National Carnival Parade. In the same year, she advocated for the establishment of a specialist college to teach carnival practices, including textile art.

== Selected works ==
- Aracena, Soraya. "Cuentos folklóricos dominicanos." Cuadernos de Letra Gráfica• núm (2009).
- Aracena, Soraya. Los inmigrantes norteamericanos de Samaná. Helvetas Asociación Suiza para la Cooperación Internacional, 2000.
- Aracena, Soraya. Apuntes sobre la negritud en República Dominicana. Helvetas, 1999.
