= Quito school =

Latin American artistic tradition

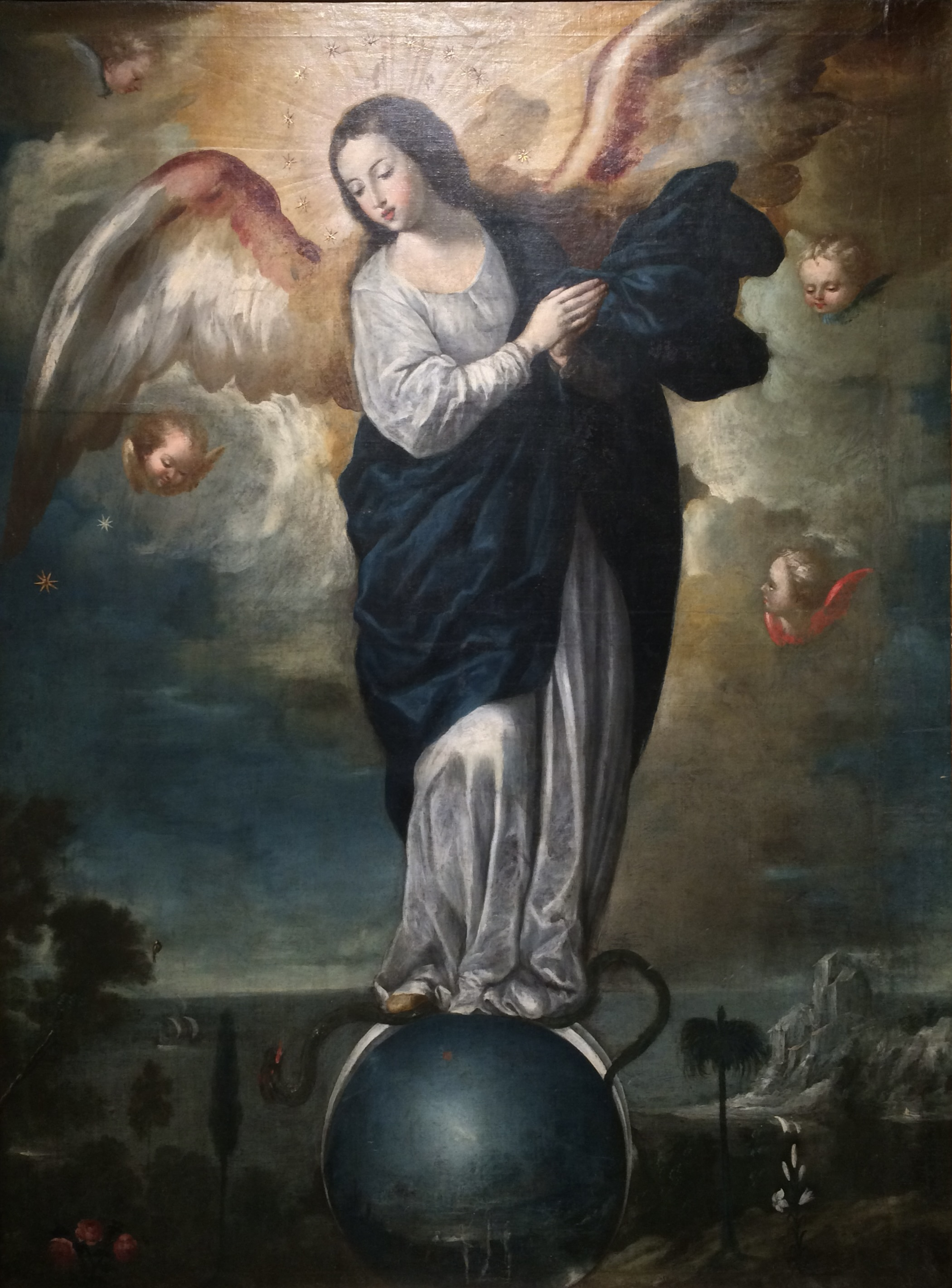
La Virgen alada del Apocalípsis ("Winged Virgin of the Apocalypse") by Miguel de Santiago, 17th century.

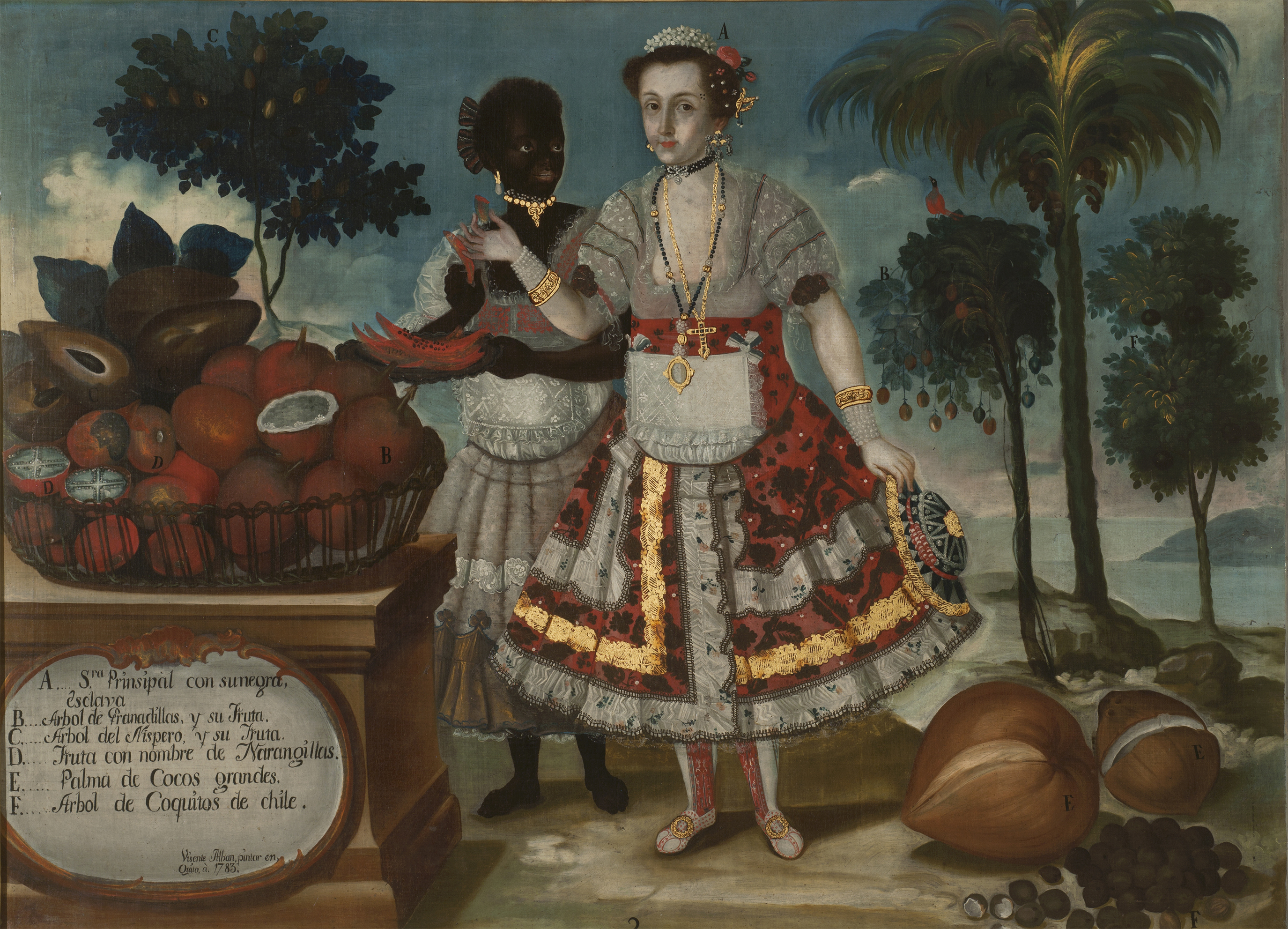
Retrato de una señora principal con su negra esclava ("Portrait of a Quito Matron Lady with Her Black Slave") by Vicente Albán, 1783. Oil on canvas, 80 x 109 cm. Madrid, Museum of the Americas.

The Quito School (Escuela Quiteña) is a Latin American colonial artistic tradition that constitutes essentially the whole of the professional artistic output developed in the territory of the Royal Audience of Quito – from Pasto and Popayán in the north to Piura and Cajamarca in the south – during the Spanish colonial period (1542–1824). It is especially associated with the 17th and 18th centuries and was almost exclusively focused on the religious art of the Catholic Church in the country. Characterized by a mastery of the realistic and by the degree to which indigenous beliefs and artistic traditions are evident, these productions were among of the most important activities in the economy of the Royal Audience of Quito. Such was the prestige of the movement even in Europe that it was said that King Carlos III of Spain (1716–1788), referring to one of its sculptors in particular, opined: "I am not concerned that Italy has Michelangelo; in my colonies of America I have the master Caspicara".

== Origins ==
The Quito School originated in the school of Artes y Oficios, founded in 1552 by the Franciscan priest Jodoco Ricke, who together with Friar Pedro Bedón transformed the San Andrés seminary, where the first indigenous artists were trained. As a cultural expression, it is the result of a long process of acculturation between indigenous peoples and Europeans, and it is one of the richest expressions of miscegenation (mestizaje) and of syncretism, in which the participation of the vanquished Indian is seemingly of minor importance as compared to the dominant European contribution.

== Characteristics ==
As a product of cultural syncretism and miscegenation, the works of the Quito School are characterized by the combination and adaptation of European and Indigenous features. In its development, it reflected the styles prevailing in each period of Spain and thus contains renaissance and mannerist elements. During its height, it was eminently baroque, concluding with a short rococo period leading to an incipient neoclassicism until the transition to the republican period. The Quito School also incorporated Flemish, Italian, and Moorish influences.

One of the common characteristics of the school is the technique of encarnado ("flesh-colored") — the simulation of the color of the flesh of the (European) human body — that makes the skin of sculptures appear more natural. Once the piece was perfectly cut and sanded, an artisan covered the wood with several layers of gesso with glue. Each layer was highly polished to achieve a perfectly smooth finish. Next, color was applied in various transparent layers, allowing an optical mix of overlapping colors. This began with the colors of shadows (blue, green, ocher), then light colors were applied (white, pink, yellow). and finally highlight colors were added (orange and red to cheeks, knees, and elbows of children; and dark blue, green, and violet for wounds and bruises of Christ or for stubble on a beardless figure).

Other typical characteristics include:

- Serpentine representation of the movement of bodies, especially in sculpture
- Application of aguada (watercolor) on top of gold leaf or silver paint, giving a special metallic sheen

The features indicating its indigenous roots include:

- "Quiteñization" of characters, with mixed traits and local costumes
- Frequent appearance of ancestral indigenous customs
- Location of the scenes within the Andean countryside or cities
- Presence of local flora and fauna, and the substitution of local plants for traditional European iconography

== Notable artists ==
=== Painters ===
- Vicente Albán
- Friar Pedro Bedón
- Nicolás Javier Goríbar
- Hernando de la Cruz
- Miguel de Santiago (ca. 1620s-1706)
- Manuel de Samaniego
- Isabel de Santiago
- Friar Pedro Gosseal

=== Sculptors ===
- Bernardo de Legarda (ca. 1700—1 June 1773)
- Manuel Chili (Caspicara)
- Miguel Angel Tejada Zambrano
- María Estefanía Dávalos y Maldonado
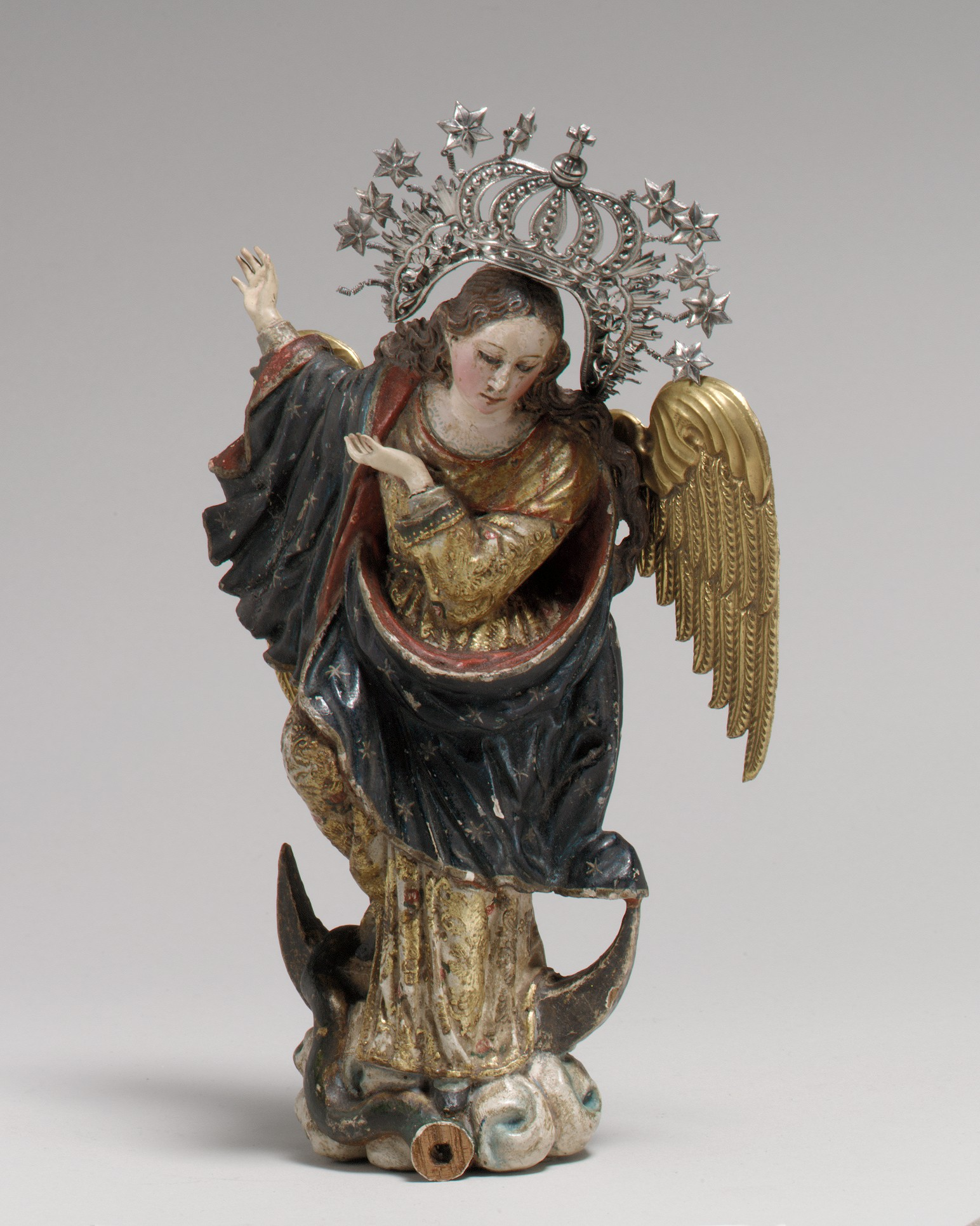
“Winged Virgin of the Apocalypse” by Miguel de Santiago.

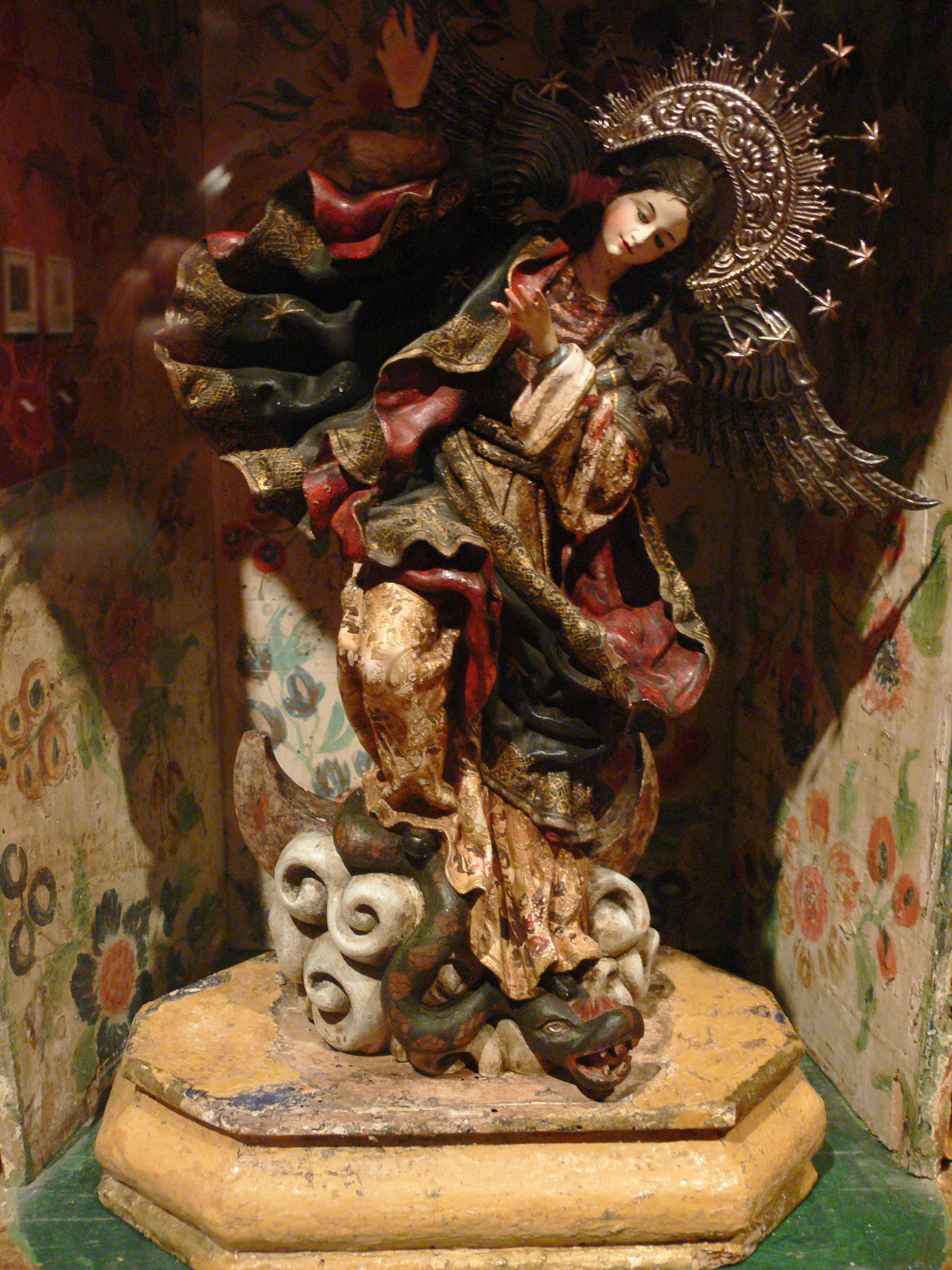
Virgin of Quito” by Bernardo de Legarda. The wooden sculpture follows the theme of the Woman of the Apocalypse.

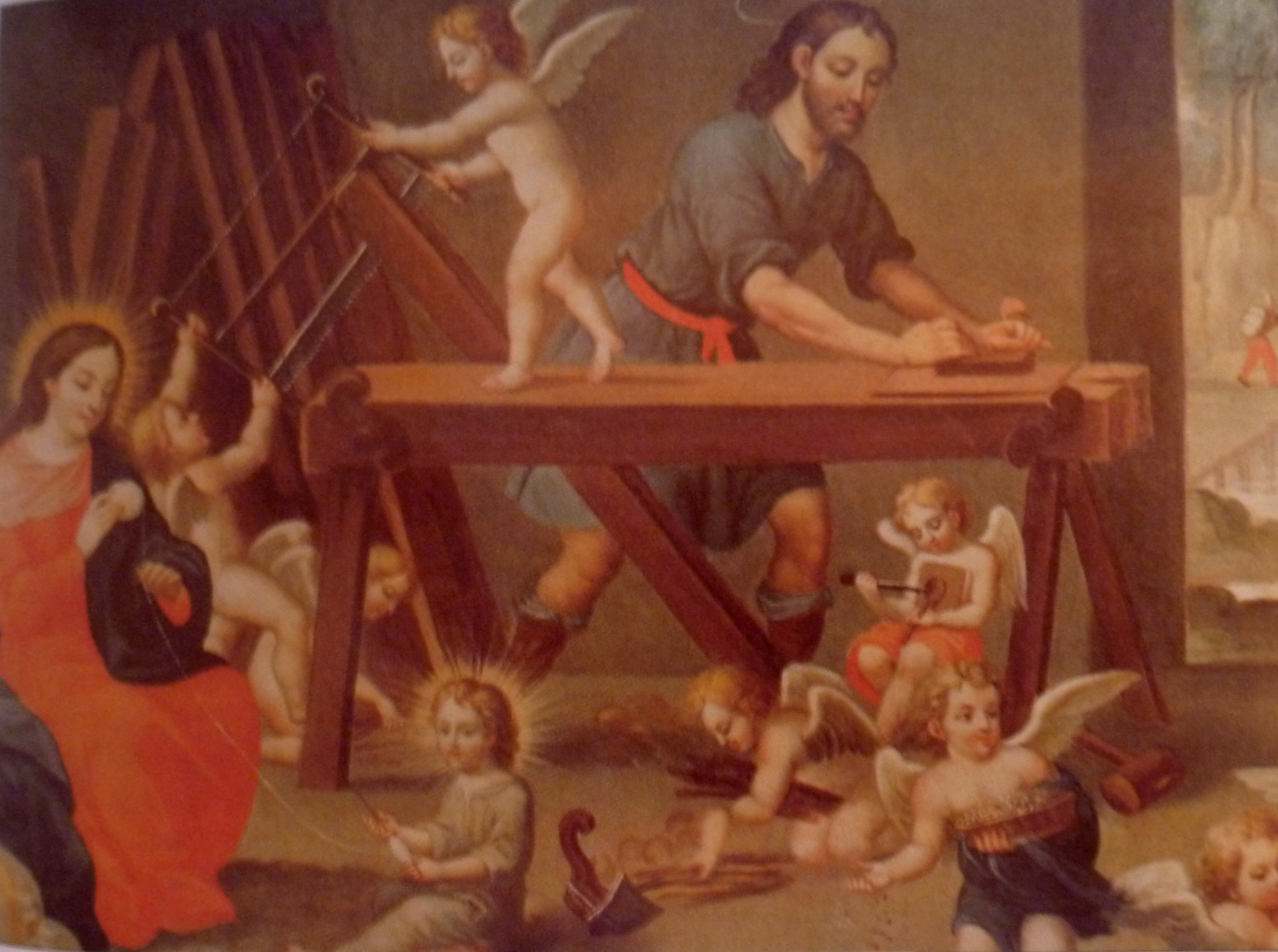
Close-up view of “St. Joseph's Workshop” by Manuel de Samaniego. Oil on canvas, 51 x 69.4 cm, 18th century. Quito, Ecuador. MUNA.

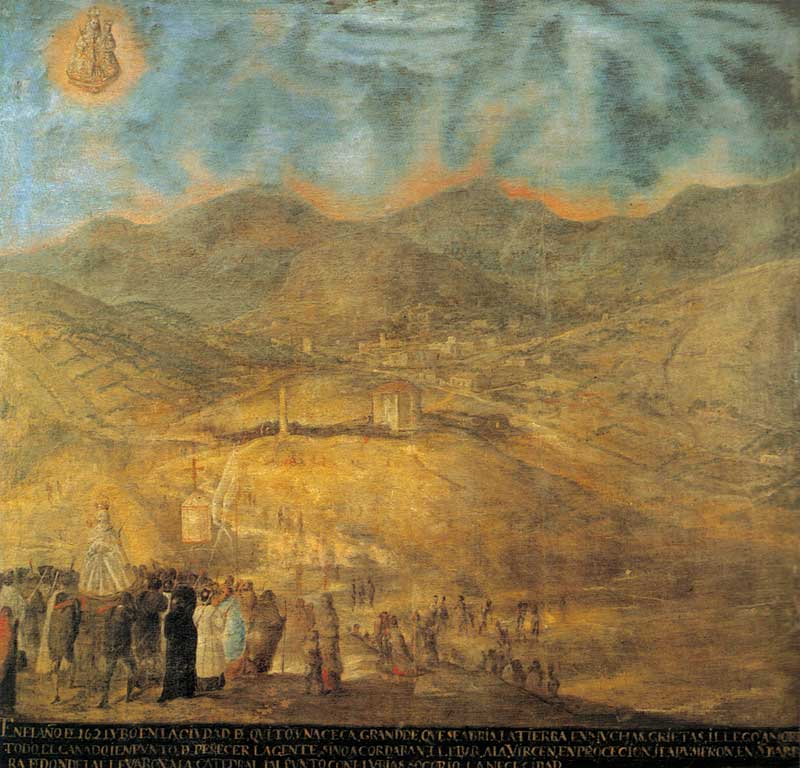
“Procession during the time of drought” from the painting series “The Virgin of Guápulo's miracles” (1699-1706) by Miguel de Santiago. Oil on canvas, 137 x 137 cm. Santiago de Guápulo, Quito, Ecuador.

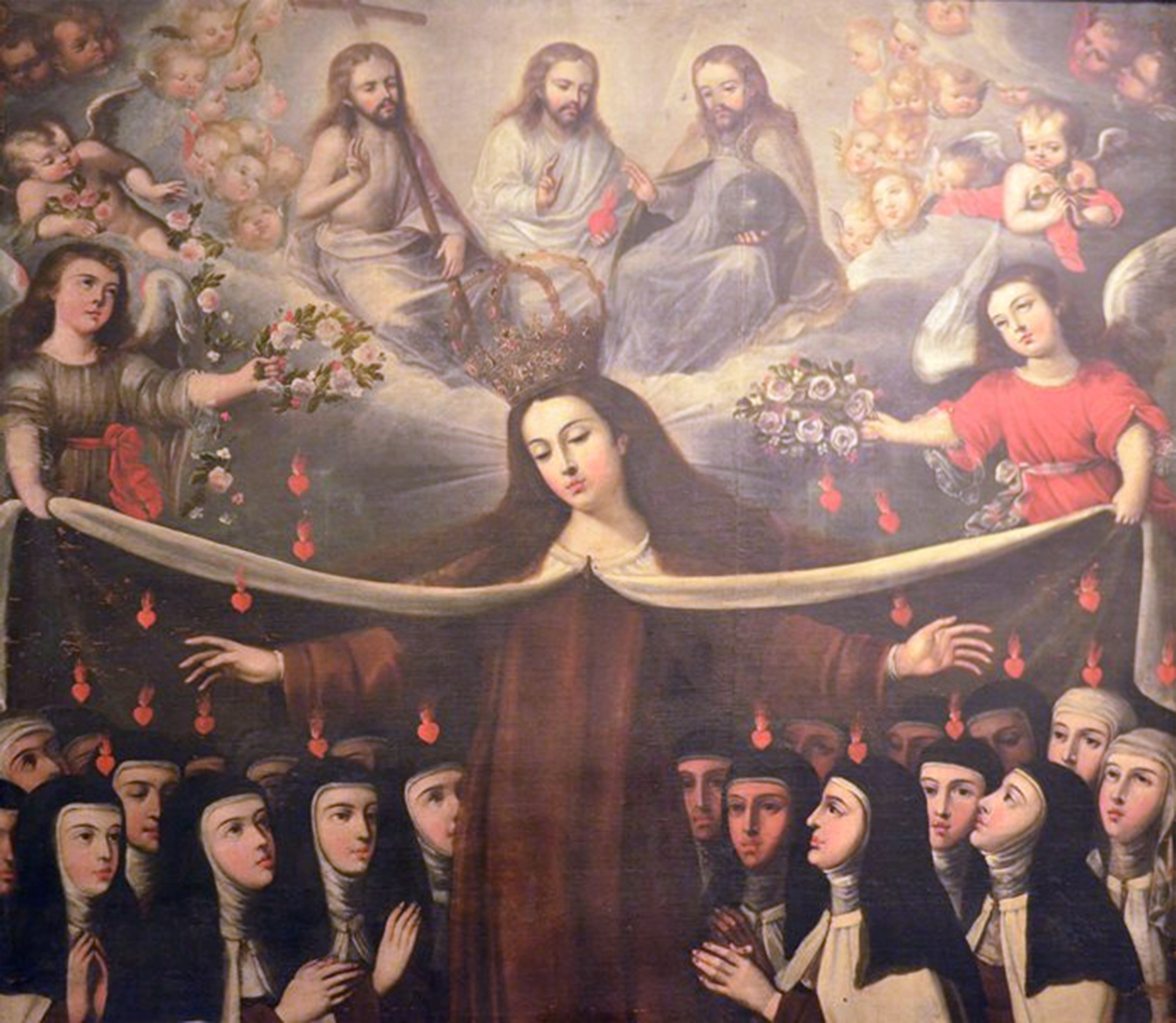
Close-up view of “Virgin of El Carmen” by Isabel de Santiago.

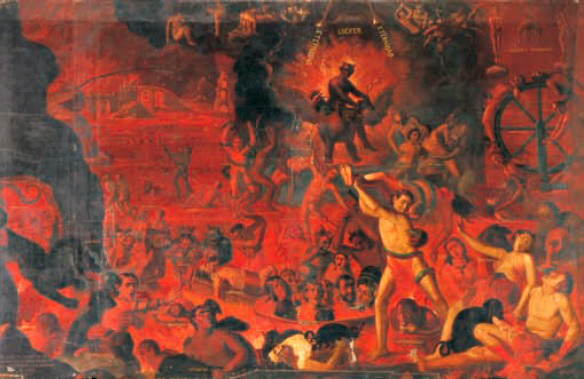
Replica of “Hell” by Hernando de la Cruz, 17th century. Iglesia de la Compañía, Quito, Ecuador.

== See also ==
- Virgin of Quito
- Baroque
