= Vicente Albán =

Painter of the Quito school

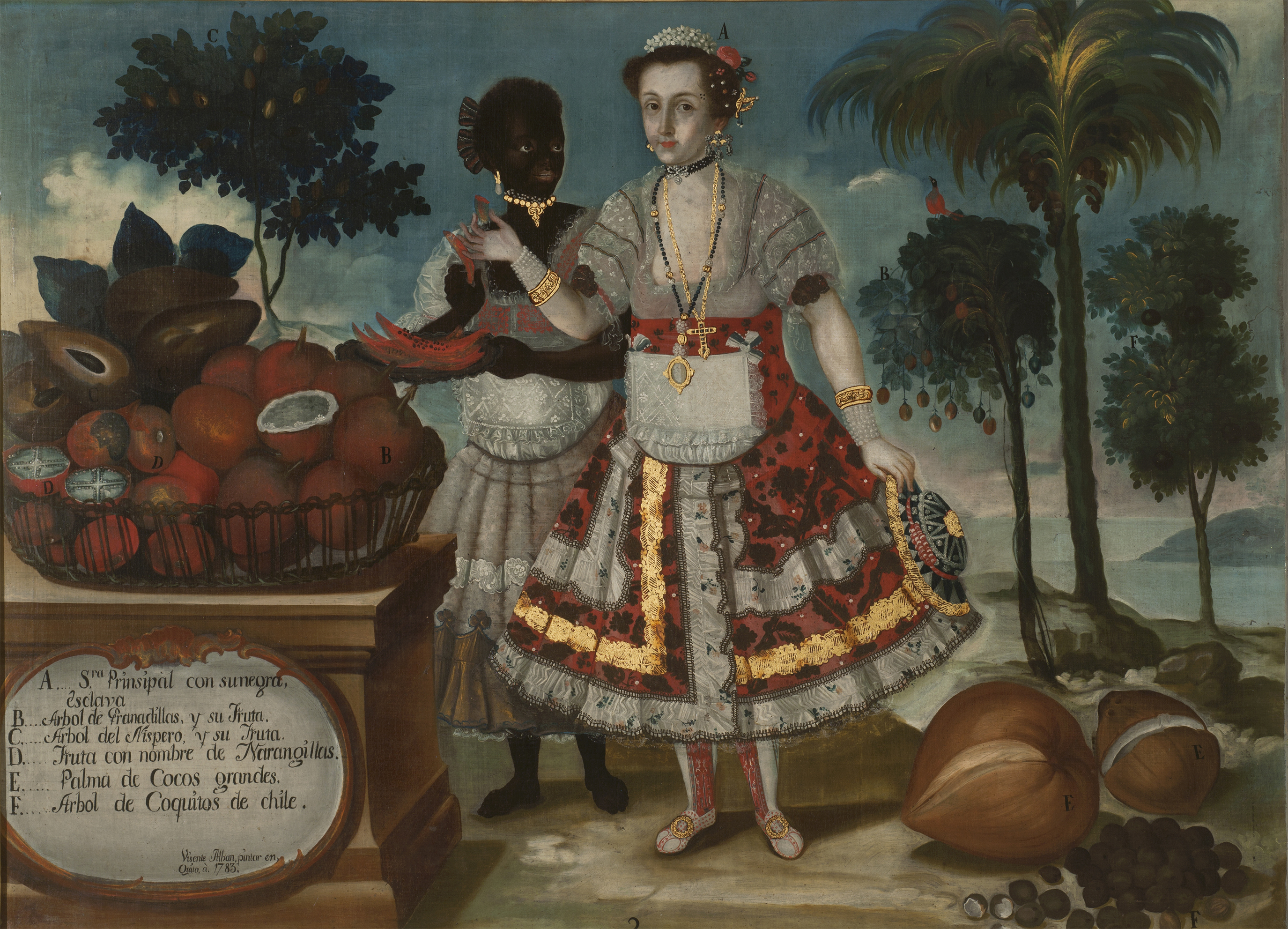
- Born: 1725; Quito, Ecuador, Viceroyalty of New Granada
- Occupation: Painter

Vincente Albán (1725 in Quito, Ecuador - Unknown) was an Ecuadorian painter, member of the Quiteña School, noted for his idealized paintings of Indigenous (Yumbo people) and Latin American-born people in their native outfits. These paintings display a variety of social classes and information on the clothing of the time. Exploring Latin American identity, his work was commissioned by José Celestino Mutis, who wanted to bring local flora into the mind of the country. The paintings were created via an oil on canvas technique. Paintings of this era such as this were often used as a method of showing American territory and the resources it provides. People shown in Albáns work were shown wearing gold and silver to demonstrate the continents wealth.

== Paintings and local fauna featured ==
- Principle Lady with her Black Slave (1783) - Franadillas tree, Loquat tree, Large Coconut Palm, Coquitos de Chile tree.
- Principal Indian of Quito with gala dress (1783) - Machetonas and Berugillas tree, Guabas tree, Fagsos Fruit, Guayabas tree
- Yapanga of Quito in a suit that uses this kind of women who try to please (1783) - Capulic tree, Custard apple trees, Caymitos, Strawberries
- Yumbo Indian from the vicinity of Quito with their feather costumes and fangs of hunting animal that they wear when they are in gala (1783) - Banana tree, Lapaias tree, Pineapples, Strawberries
- India in gala dress (1783) - Avacado tree, Chilguacanes tree, Chamburos tree, Namey Fruit
- Yndio yumbo de Maynas with his load (1783) - Pitahayas tree, Obo tree, Mamei tree, Pumpkin
- Portrait of Bisiop of Quito Manuel Blas Nephew (1783)

== Notable exhibits ==
- 1780 - Possession of King Carlos III of Spain
- ? - Museum of Natural Sciences of Madrid
- ? - Ethnographic Section of the National Archaeological Museum
- 1941 - Museum of America of Madrid
- 2018 - National Museum of Ecuador (90 days then returned to the Museum of America of Madrid)

== Gallery ==
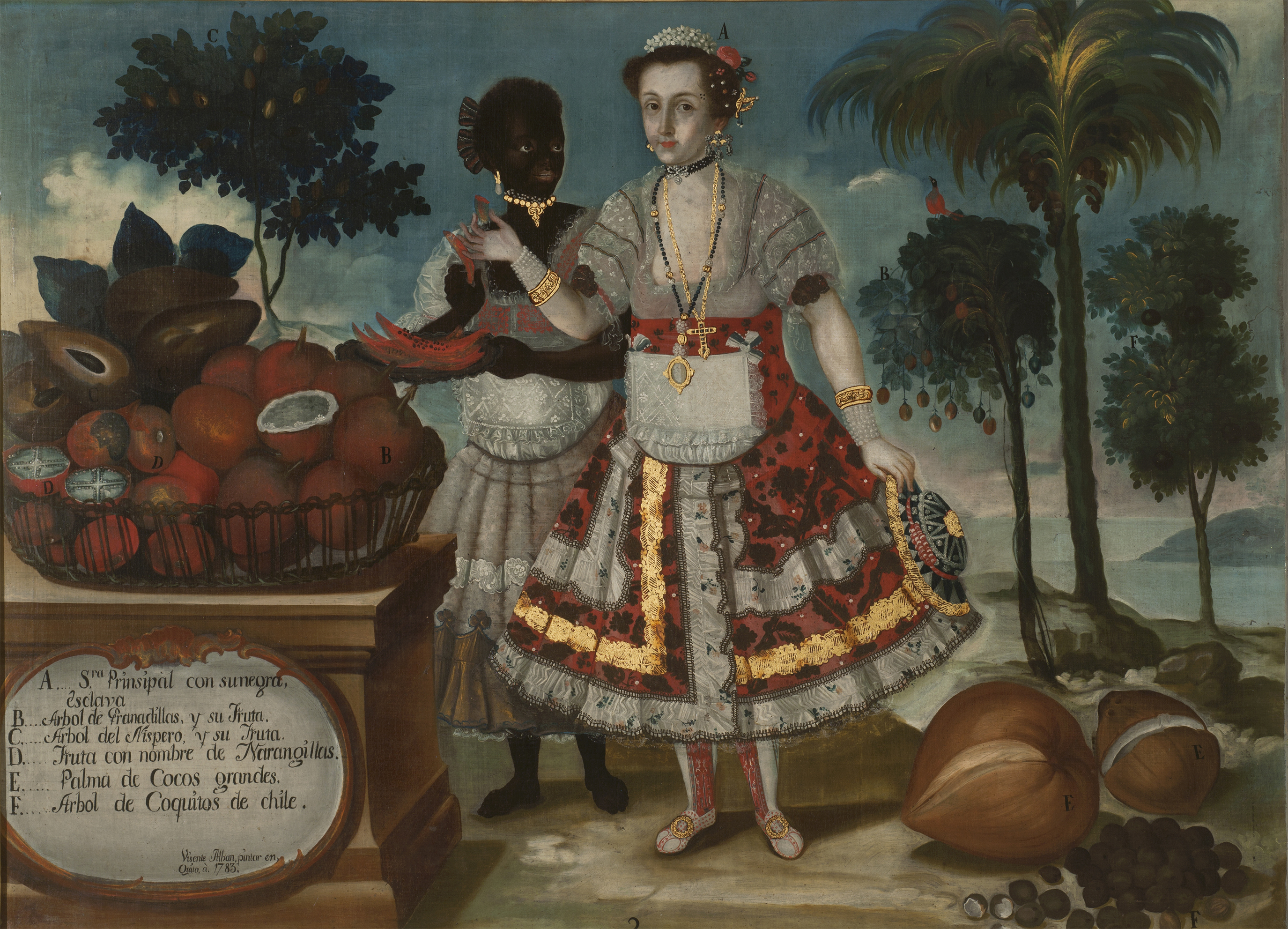
Portrait of a principal lady with her black slave by Vicente Albán

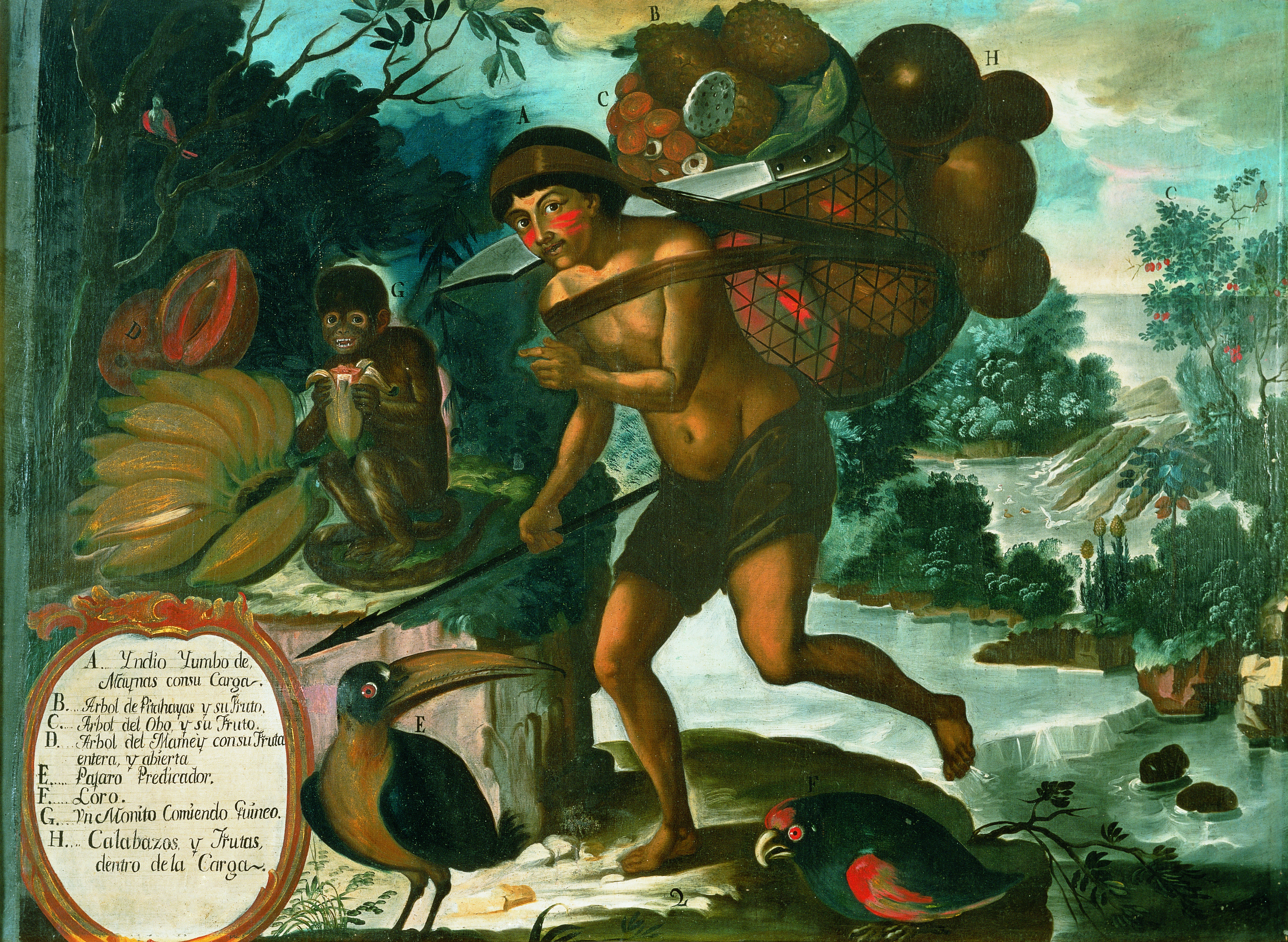
Yndio yumbo de Maynas with his load with flora and fruits of the country by Vicente Albán

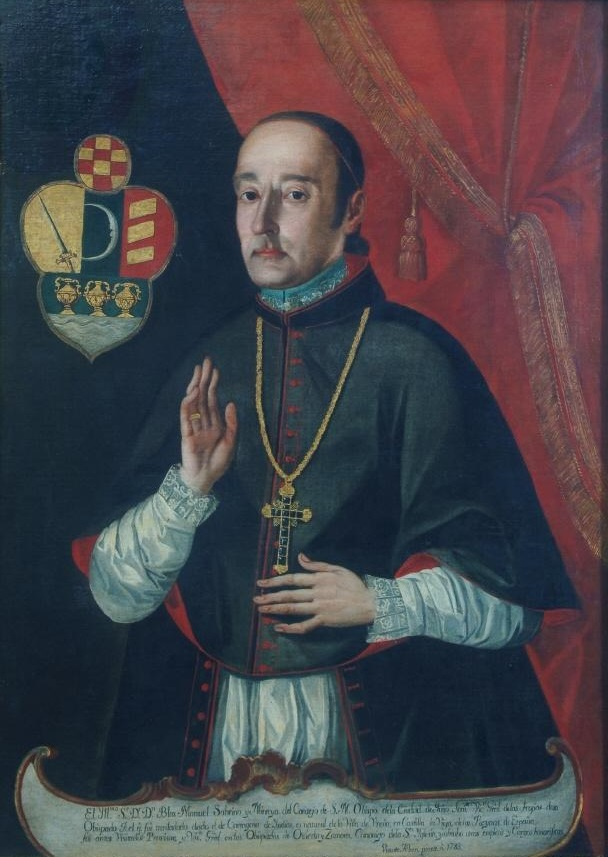
Portrait of the Bishop of Quito Manuel Blas Nephew by Vicente Albán
