= Isabel de Santiago =

Spanish artist (1666– c. 1714)

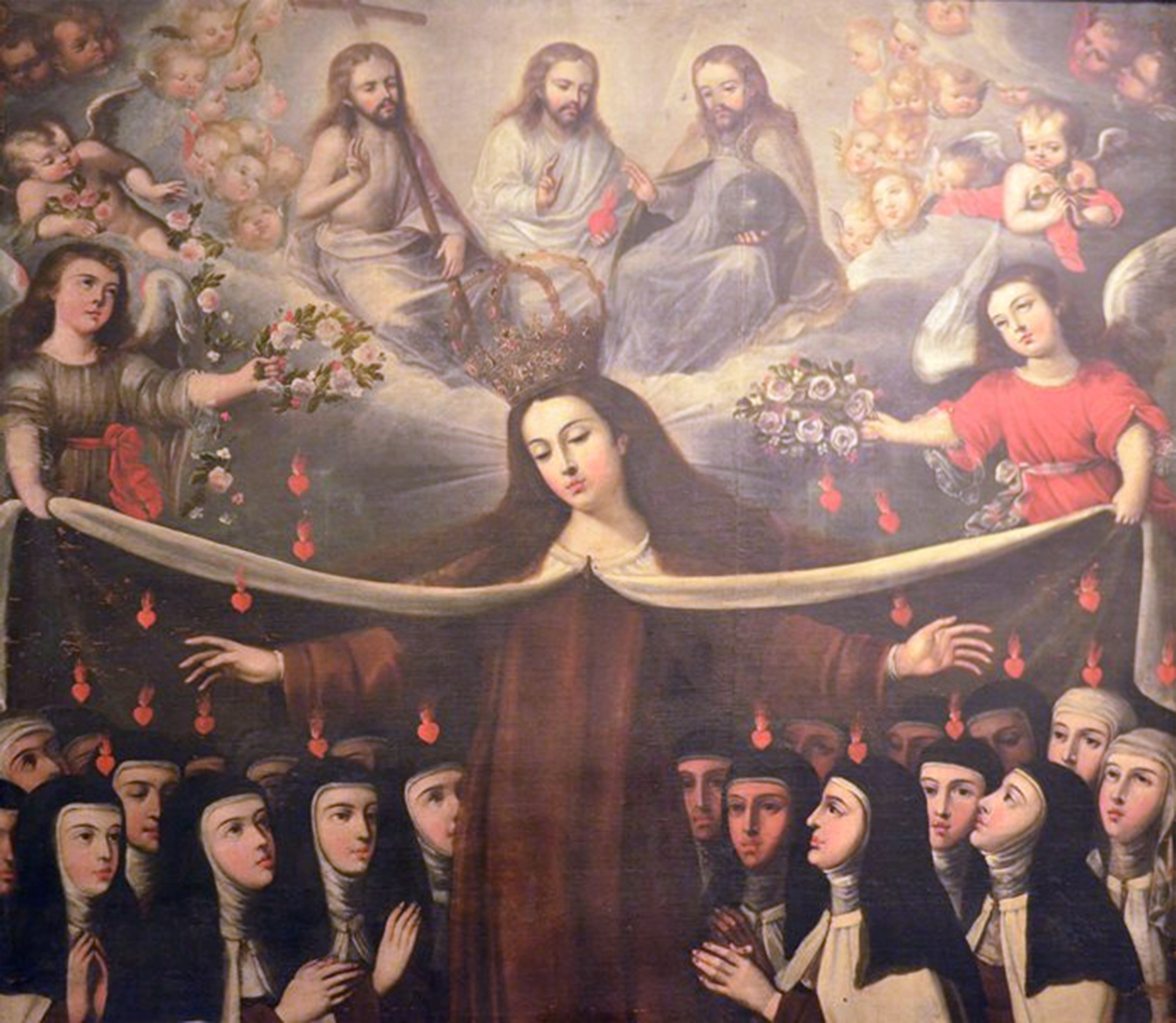
- Virgen del Carmen, oil painting by Isabel de Santiago
- Born: Isabel de Cisneros y Alvarado; Between 1660 and 1670; Quito, Ecuador
- Died: 1714; Quito, Ecuador
- Other names: Isabel de Santiago
- Occupations: Painting, Draftswoman
- Movement: Quito School (Escuela Quiteña)
- Parent: Miguel de Santiago

Isabel de Cisneros (1666 – ca. 1714) was a Criollo colonial painter born in the colony of Quito (Ecuador). She was the daughter of Miguel de Santiago, one of the most famous colonial Quito School painters. Often referred to as Isabel de Santiago, she however identified herself as Cisneros, a name she inherited from her mother.

== Life ==
Isabel was born in 1666 to Miguel de Santiago, a mestizo, and Andrea Cisneros y Alvarado, who was Spanish. She trained and worked in her father's workshop. She married Captain Antonio Egas and together they had five children. Isabel was the only member of her immediate family to outlive her father, who was pre-deceased by her mother Andrea, her sister and her three brothers. Isabel gained prominence in her father's studio after the departure of her father's gifted student, Nicolás Goíbar.

== Works ==
Copy of Portrait of Juana de Jesús, original: Isabel de Cisneros. Ca. 1703, Convent of Santa Clara, Quito, Ecuador.

She specialized in oil paintings of the childhood of the Virgin and of the baby Jesus, adorned with flowers and animals. It is speculated that she would have worked alongside her father on the Milagros de La virgen series (1699-1706) while she worked in his studio. One of her most famous works is a portrait of Juana de Jesús (1662-1703), a sister of the Poor Clares, which was painted after the nun's death. A contemporary writer, Francisco Javier Antonio, complimented the likeness, attributing its accuracy to Isabel de Cisneros having met Juana de Jesús several times. This work is the only securely attributed painting to her, but unfortunately it has not survived, and only a copy survives at the convent of Santa Clara in Quito. Juana "looks incredibly Quiteña with a long nose, a subdued smile, a narrow face, and delicate hands".
