= HaMerotz LaMillion 8 =

Season of television series

- Season 8
- Presented by: Ron Shahar
- No. of teams: 12
- Winners: Yael Carmon & Yosiel Neeman
- No. of legs: 12
- Distance traveled: 35,000 km (22,000 mi)
- No. of episodes: 35 (37 including recaps)

Release
- Original network: Channel 13
- Original release: 6 September – 8 December 2020

Additional information
- Filming dates: 1 December – 22 December 2018; 6 December 2020

Series chronology
- ← Previous; Season 7 Next → Season 9 (on Channel 12)

HaMerotz LaMillion 8, also known as HaMerotz LaMillion: All Stars, is the eighth season of HaMerotz LaMillion (Hebrew: המירוץ למיליון, lit. The Race to the Million), an Israeli reality competition show based on the American series The Amazing Race. Hosted by Ron Shahar, it featured six new teams of two with a pre-existing relationship and six returning teams of two in a race around the world to win ₪1,000,000. This season visited three continents and seven countries and traveled over 35,000 kilometres (22,000 mi) during twelve legs. Starting in Las Piñas, racers traveled through the Philippines, the Netherlands, Armenia, Chile, Ecuador, Brazil, and Israel before finishing in Tel Aviv. The season premiered on 6 September 2020 on Channel 13 with the finale on 8 December 2020.

Cousins Yael Carmon and Yosiel Neeman from HaMerotz LaMillion 5 were the winners of this season, while childhood friends Asaf Tetro and Netah Merran finished second, and siblings Omer and Neta Barazani from HaMerotz LaMillion 6 finished third.

== Production ==
=== Development and filming ===
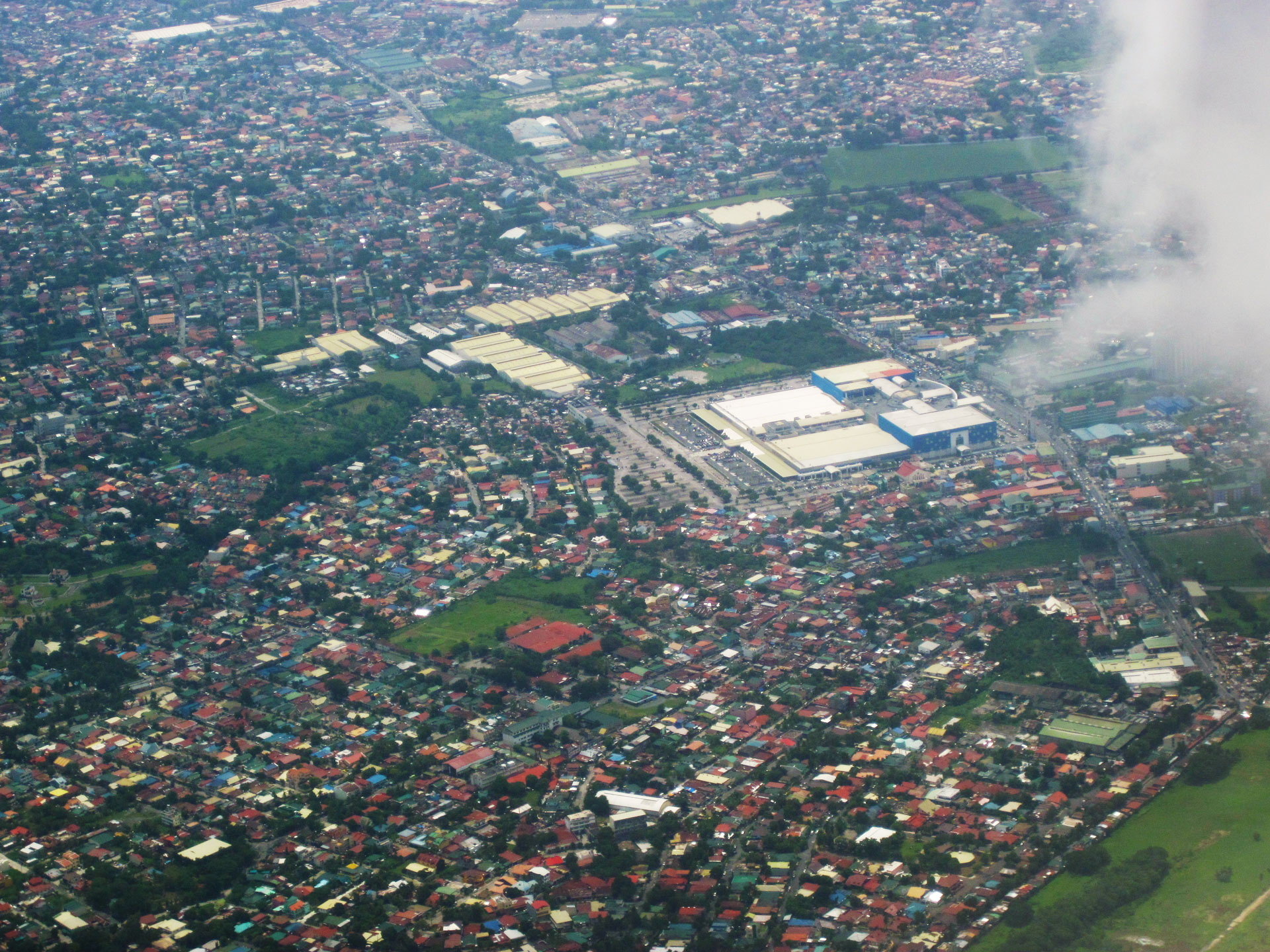
The Philippine city of Las Piñas was the site of the start of HaMerotz LaMillion: All Stars.

While the previous season was filming, rumors circulated that teams from previous seasons would be participating on the subsequent season. On 28 November 2018, before the Season 7 finale was filmed, media outlets spotted the six teams returning to the show at Ben Gurion Airport. A few days later, production of the season began in the Philippines directly after the conclusion of the previous season. The second half of the season's first leg was filmed the same day when the tenth leg of The Amazing Race 32, which also finished in Rizal Park, was being filmed in Manila. Principal filming of the season ended on 22 December 2018. The final segment in Israel was filmed in early December 2020 to prevent the final results from leaking.

This season is the first time an Amazing Race franchise filmed a second season directly after the filming of another season. This season marks the fourth Amazing Race franchise that brought back previous contestants to compete following the original American version, The Amazing Race Vietnam, and The Amazing Race China (The Amazing Race Canada 7, which featured a single viewer-voted returning team, aired after HaMerotz LaMillion 8 was filmed but before it aired). This is also the second season, after the second Chinese season (The Amazing Race Australia 4, which also featured an international Starting Line, was filmed after HaMerotz LaMillion 8 but aired before this season), in which the Starting Line did not take place in the show's host country.

Similar the previous season, a companion series aired online entitled To Be Ron Shahar, which featured comedians Duvdevani and Kovach following the filming of the season and learning how to be the show's hosts. In addition, after their elimination Vova & Alla hosted a segment where they provided their commentary about episodes that had just aired.

== Cast ==
Contestants	Age	Relationship	Hometown	Status
Ruthi Ibn Ofir (רותי)	57	Cousins	Beit Nekofa	Eliminated 1st (in Manila, Philippines)
Michal Azulay (מיכל)	53	Cousins	Beit Nekofa	Eliminated 1st (in Manila, Philippines)
Shiri Stanescu (שירי)	20	Identical Twins	Ramat Gan	Eliminated 2nd (in Panglao, Philippines)
Noga Stanescu (נגה)	20	Identical Twins	Ramat Gan	Eliminated 2nd (in Panglao, Philippines)
Vova Lazarovitch (וובה)	31	Exes; HaMerotz LaMillion 4	Petah Tikva	Eliminated 3rd (in Amsterdam, Netherlands)
Alla Aibinder (אלה)	29	Exes; HaMerotz LaMillion 4	Tel Aviv	Eliminated 3rd (in Amsterdam, Netherlands)
Yarden Vizel (ירדן)	24	Best Friends; HaMerotz LaMillion 6	Givatayim	Eliminated 4th (in Yerevan, Armenia)
Anne Zivi (אן)	24	Best Friends; HaMerotz LaMillion 6	Givatayim	Eliminated 4th (in Yerevan, Armenia)
Tali Algabi (טלי)	45	Siblings	Tel Aviv	Eliminated 5th (in Santiago, Chile)
Gili Algabi (גילי)	29	Siblings	Tel Aviv	Eliminated 5th (in Santiago, Chile)
Eviatar Nagar (אביתר)	30	Married	Ramat Gan	Eliminated 6th (in Valparaíso, Chile)
Liane Weinman (ליאן)	32	Married	Ramat Gan	Eliminated 6th (in Valparaíso, Chile)
Ash Mor (אש)	27	Dating	Jerusalem	Eliminated 7th (in Quito, Ecuador)
Alice Zanu (אליס)	24	Dating	Jerusalem	Eliminated 7th (in Quito, Ecuador)
Shay Gavriel (שי)	32	Friends; HaMerotz LaMillion 4	Ein Ya'akov	Eliminated 8th (in Santos, Brazil)
Shani Alon (שני)	31	Friends; HaMerotz LaMillion 4	Ein Ya'akov	Eliminated 8th (in Santos, Brazil)
Ben Scheflan (בן)	27	Brothers; HaMerotz LaMillion 5	Tel Aviv	Eliminated 9th (in São Paulo, Brazil)
Ori Scheflan (אורי)	24	Brothers; HaMerotz LaMillion 5	Tel Aviv	Eliminated 9th (in São Paulo, Brazil)
Omer Barazani (עומר)	26	Siblings; HaMerotz LaMillion 6	Jerusalem	Third Place
Neta Barazani (נטע)	20	Siblings; HaMerotz LaMillion 6	Jerusalem	Third Place
Asaf Tetro (אסף)	23	Childhood Friends	Holon	Second Place
Netah Merran (נתא)	23	Childhood Friends	Holon	Second Place
Yael Carmon (יעל)	29	Cousins; HaMerotz LaMillion 5	Tel Aviv	Winners
Yosiel Neeman (יוסיאל)	25	Cousins; HaMerotz LaMillion 5	Holon	Winners

The returning teams and their prior placements are:

- From Season 4:
  - Shay Gavriel and Shani Alon, Her Husband's Best Friend, 1st place
  - Vladimir "Vova" Lazarovitch and Alla Aibinder, New Olim & Exes, 4th place
- From Season 5:
  - Ben and Ori Scheflan, Brothers, 6th place
  - Yael Carmon and Yosiel Neeman, Cousins, 5th place
- From Season 6:
  - Anne Zivi and Yarden Vizel, Best Friends, 5th place
  - Omer and Neta Barazani, Siblings, 4th place

=== Future appearances ===
In 2021, Omer Barazani competed on Big Brother VIP 4 and finished in third place. Alla Aibinder competed on and won the eleventh season of the Israeli edition of Survivor in 2021.

== Results ==
The following teams participated in the season, with their relationships at the time of filming. Note that this table is not necessarily reflective of all content broadcast on television due to inclusion or exclusion of some data. Placements are listed in finishing order:

Team	Position (by leg)												Roadblocks performed
Team	1+	2	3	4	5+	6+	7+	8	9	10	11	12	Roadblocks performed
Yael & Yosiel	2nd	4th	1st	3rd<	4th<	1st>	3rd<	2nd>^{4}	4th>	1st>	1st	1st	Yael 0, Yosiel 1
Netah & Asaf	3rd	3rd⊃	3rd<	1st>	1st>	6th<	5th>^{3}	1st<	1st<	3rd<	2nd	2nd	Netah 0, Asaf 1
Omer & Neta	9th	8th	2nd>	2nd	6th	5th>−	2nd	5th»	2nd	2nd	3rd	3rd	Omer 1, Neta 0
Ben & Ori	10th	9th	5th>	5th	5th−	3rd>	4th	4th>	5th>	4th>	4th		Ben 1, Ori 0
Shay & Shani	5th^{1}	2nd	4th	7th>	8th>	2nd	1st	3rd»	3rd>	5th>			Shay 1, Shani 0
Ash & Alice	4th	1st⊃	7th	6th	2nd	7th	6th−	6th«					Ash 1, Alice 0
Liane & Eviatar	1st	5th	6th	4th>	7th>	4th	7th>						Liane 0, Eviatar 1
Gili & Tali	8th>	6th⊃	8th	8th>	3rd>	8th							Gili 0, Tali 0
Anne & Yarden	7th	10th	9th>	9th									Anne 0, Yarden 0
Vova & Alla	11th<	7th⊂	10th>										Vova 0, Alla 0
Shiri & Noga	6th>	11th⊃											Shiri 0, Noga 0
Michal & Ruthi	12th>−^{2}												Michal 0, Ruthi 0

Key

- A red team placement means the team was eliminated.
- A blue team placement indicates that the team was the last to arrive at a Pit Stop in a non-elimination leg.
- An orange + indicates that there was a Duel on this leg, while an orange − indicates the team that lost the Duel and received a 15-minute penalty.
- A yellow < or orange « indicates the team who received a Yield; > and » indicates that the team voted for the recipient.
- A brown ⊂ indicates the team who received a U-Turn; ⊃ indicates that the team voted for the recipient.

Notes

1. Shay & Shani elected to forfeit a round at the Duel allowing Liane & Eviatar to receive their next clue due to the task triggering a fear of water with Lian.
2. Michal & Ruthi elected to forfeit the Duel and accept the 15 minute penalty due to Michal feeling ill.
3. Netah & Asaf elected to forfeit a round at the Duel allowing Omer & Neta to receive their next clue.
4. Yael & Yosiel were the first team to check in, but they hadn't found the bus ticket to disembark and were sent back to the bus. Netah & Asaf checked in during this time, dropping them to 2nd.

=== Voting history ===
Teams may vote to choose either U-Turn or Yield. The team with the most votes received the U-Turn or Yield penalty, depending on the respective leg.

	Yield	U-Turn	Yield							
Leg #	1	2	3	4	5	6	7	8	9	10
U-Turned/Yielded	Vova & Alla	Vova & Alla	Netah & Asaf	Yael & Yosiel	Yael & Yosiel	Netah & Asaf	Yael & Yosiel	Netah & Asaf; Ash & Alice	Netah & Asaf	Netah & Asaf
Result	3–2–2–1–1–1–1–1	4–2–2–1–1–1	4–2–2–1–1	4–3–1–1	4–3–1	3–2–1–1–1	2–1–1–1–1–1	2–2–1–1	3–1–1	3–1–1
Voter	Team's Vote									
Yael & Yosiel	Ben & Ori	Ben & Ori	Vova & Alla	Netah & Asaf	Netah & Asaf	Netah & Asaf	Netah & Asaf	Netah & Asaf	Netah & Asaf	Netah & Asaf
Netah & Asaf	Shay & Shani	Vova & Alla	Yael & Yosiel	Yael & Yosiel	Yael & Yosiel	Yael & Yosiel	Yael & Yosiel	Yael & Yosiel	Yael & Yosiel	Yael & Yosiel
Omer & Neta	Michal & Ruthi	Netah & Asaf	Netah & Asaf	Netah & Asaf	Netah & Asaf	Netah & Asaf	Ben & Ori	Ash & Alice	Ben & Ori	Ben & Ori
Ben & Ori	Yael & Yosiel	Yael & Yosiel	Netah & Asaf	Netah & Asaf	Netah & Asaf	Netah & Asaf	Omer & Neta	Netah & Asaf	Netah & Asaf	Netah & Asaf
Shay & Shani	Shiri & Noga	Ash & Alice	Ash & Alice	Yael & Yosiel	Yael & Yosiel	Ash & Alice	Ash & Alice	Ash & Alice	Netah & Asaf	Netah & Asaf
Ash & Alice	Shay & Shani	Vova & Alla	Vova & Alla	Shay & Shani	Shay & Shani	Shay & Shani	Shay & Shani	Shay & Shani		
Liane & Eviatar	Anne & Yarden	Ben & Ori	Yael & Yosiel	Yael & Yosiel	Yael & Yosiel	Yael & Yosiel	Yael & Yosiel			
Gili & Tali	Vova & Alla	Vova & Alla	Anne & Yarden	Yael & Yosiel	Yael & Yosiel	Neta & Omer				
Anne & Yarden	Netah & Asaf	Liane & Eviatar	Netah & Asaf	Gili & Tali						
Vova & Alla	Netah & Asaf	Netah & Asaf	Netah & Asaf							
Shiri & Noga	Vova & Alla	Vova & Alla								
Michal & Ruthi	Vova & Alla									

== Episode Titles ==
Translated from Hebrew from the official website:

1. The Launch Event (אירוע ההזנקה) (Leg 1)
2. The All Stars vs. the Rookies (האולסטארס נגד החדשים) (Leg 1)
3. First Elimination (הדחה ראשונה) (Leg 1)
4. Shani's Trick (התרגיל של שני) (Leg 2)
5. Vova & Alla Against Everyone (וובה ואלה נגד כולם) (Leg 2)
6. The All Stars War (מלחמת האולסטארס) (Leg 2)
7. Dramatic Elimination (הדחה דרמטית) (Leg 2)
8. The Move that Changed Everything (המהלך ששינה הכל) (Leg 3)
9. The Storm Continues (הסערה ממשיכה) (Leg 3)
10. Painful Elimination (הדחה כואבת) (Leg 3)
11. The Mountain of Screams (הר הצרחות) (Leg 4)
12. The Kardashians (הקרדשיאנס) (Leg 4)
13. The Cruel Mission (המשימה האכזרית) (Leg 4)
14. Surprising Elimination (הדחה מפתיעה) (Leg 4)
15. The Accident (התאונה) (Leg 5)
16. Knights Battle (קרב אבירים) (Leg 5)
17. The Sweet Task (המשימה המתוקה) (Leg 5)
18. Elimination Before South America (הדחה לפני דרום אמריקה) (Legs 5 & 6)
19. Adventure in Chile (הרפתקאה בצ'ילה) (Leg 6)
20. Elimination in Chile (הדחה בצ'ילה) (Leg 6)
21. The Event that Turned the Season (האירוע שהפך את העונה) (Leg 7)
22. Shani's Injury (הפציעה של שני) (Leg 7)
23. The Mission that Dismantled the Teams (המשימה שפירקה את הזוגות) (Leg 7)
24. The Fall of Yael & Yosiel (הנפילה של יעל ויוסיאל) (Leg 7)
25. Neta in Intensive Care (נטע בטיפול נמרץ) (Leg 8)
26. Elimination Episode (פרק הדחה) (Leg 8)
27. The Amazon Animals (חיות האמזונאס) (Leg 9)
28. The Families Join (המשפחות מצטרפות) (Leg 9)
29. Elimination Episode (פרק הדחה) (Leg 9)
30. The Final Country (מדינת הגמר) (Leg 10)
31. The Craziest Elimination in the World (ההדחה המטורפת בעולם) (Leg 10)
32. The "Selfie" Mission (משימת ה"סלפי") (Leg 11)
33. Episode Collection (פרק לקט) (Recap)
34. The Ticket to the Final (הכרטיס לגמר) (Leg 11)
35. Who Will Be the Final Three? (מי תהיה שלישיית הגמר?) (Leg 11)
36. 24 Hours to the Final (24 שעות לגמר) (Recap)
37. The Great Final (הגמר הגדול) (Leg 12)

== Race summary ==
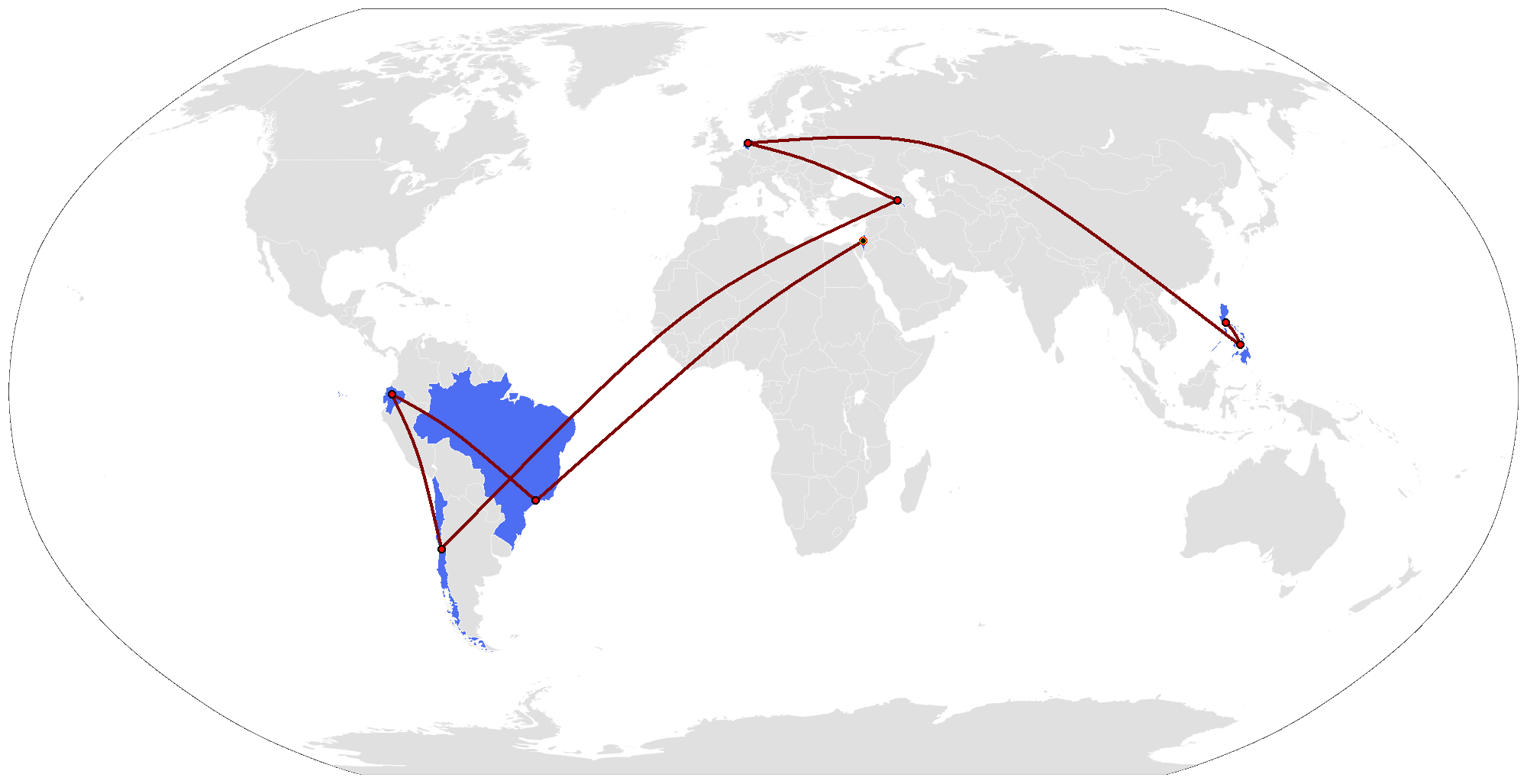
The route map of HaMerotz LaMillion 8.

Destinations	Air travel Rail travel Water travel Bus travel Helicopter travel Bicycle travel Gondola travel
Route Markers	צומת (Detour) מחסום (Roadblock) דו–קרב (Duel) סיבוב פרסה (U-Turn) עצור (Yield) נקודת סיום (Pit Stop)

=== Leg 1 (Philippines) ===
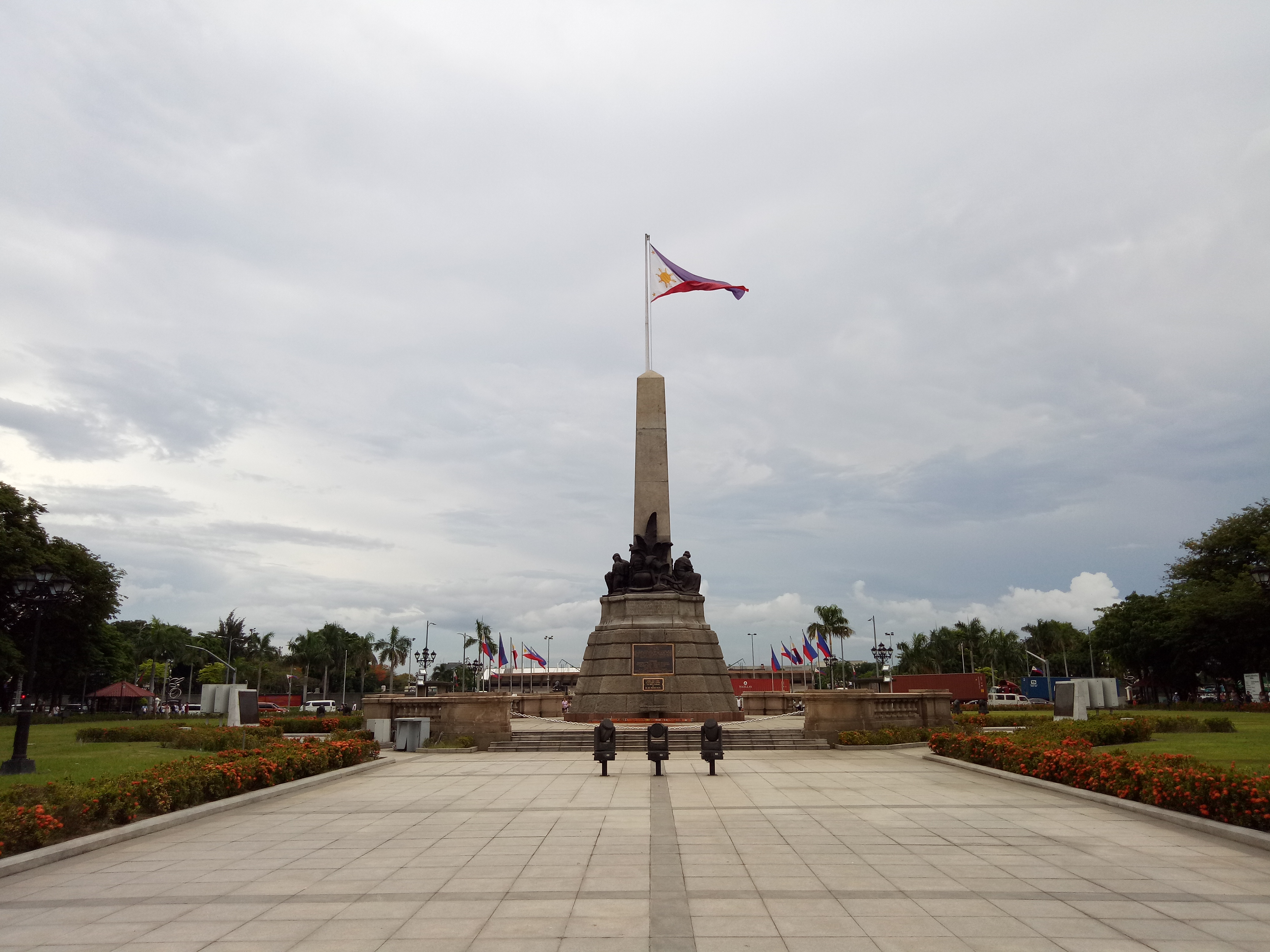
The Rizal Monument in Manila served as the season's first Pit Stop.

Airdates: 6, 7 & 9 September 2020

- Las Piñas, Philippines (Versailles Palace) (Starting Line)
- Pasay (CCP Open Grounds)
- Pasay (Pasay City Mall & Public Market)
- Taguig (Philippine Army Wellness Center)
- Manila (Hotel H2O) (Overnight Rest)
- Manila (Manila Ocean Park)
- Las Piñas (Versailles Palace)
- Mandaluyong (Sales Rain)
- Manila (Rizal Park – Independence Flagpole)
- Manila (Rizal Park – Rizal Monument)

For this season's first Duel, one team stood on a floating platform in the middle of a pool and members of the opposing team would be on either side of the platform swinging a bar that the team members on the platform had to jump over to earn a point. After two minutes, teams would swap roles. After the second round the team with the higher score would receive their next clue, while the losing team had to wait for another team. The team that lost the final Duel had to wait out a 15-minute penalty. Teams would then vote for the team they wished to Yield.

Additional tasks

- At the CCP Open Grounds, one team member would be harnessed and swung by their partner to grab titles with Baybayin letters. They had to find the letters for a word and would then be raised by their partner to a board, where they had to spell the word to receive their next clue.
- At the Pasay City Mall & Public Market, teams were given a shopping list of ingredients written in Hebrew that they had to find in the market and bring to a chef to receive their next clue.
- At Manila Ocean Park, one team member had to don a wetsuit and diving helmet and enter the oceanarium. Their partner had to pantomime three fish, which the racer in the tank had to take selfies of to receive their next clue. Teams would then discover if they had been Yielded.
- At Versailles Palace, teams had to step into a set of boxes, use their feet to feel the items inside, and correctly guess the ten items to receive their next clue.
- At Sales Rain, teams entered a call centre full of ringing telephones. Some of the phones played a lyric to a song, and teams had to figure out that the song was "Queen of the Roses" from Eden Ben Zaken to receive their next clue directing them to the Pit Stop, where the Yielded team had to wait out a 15-minute penalty.

=== Leg 2 (Philippines) ===
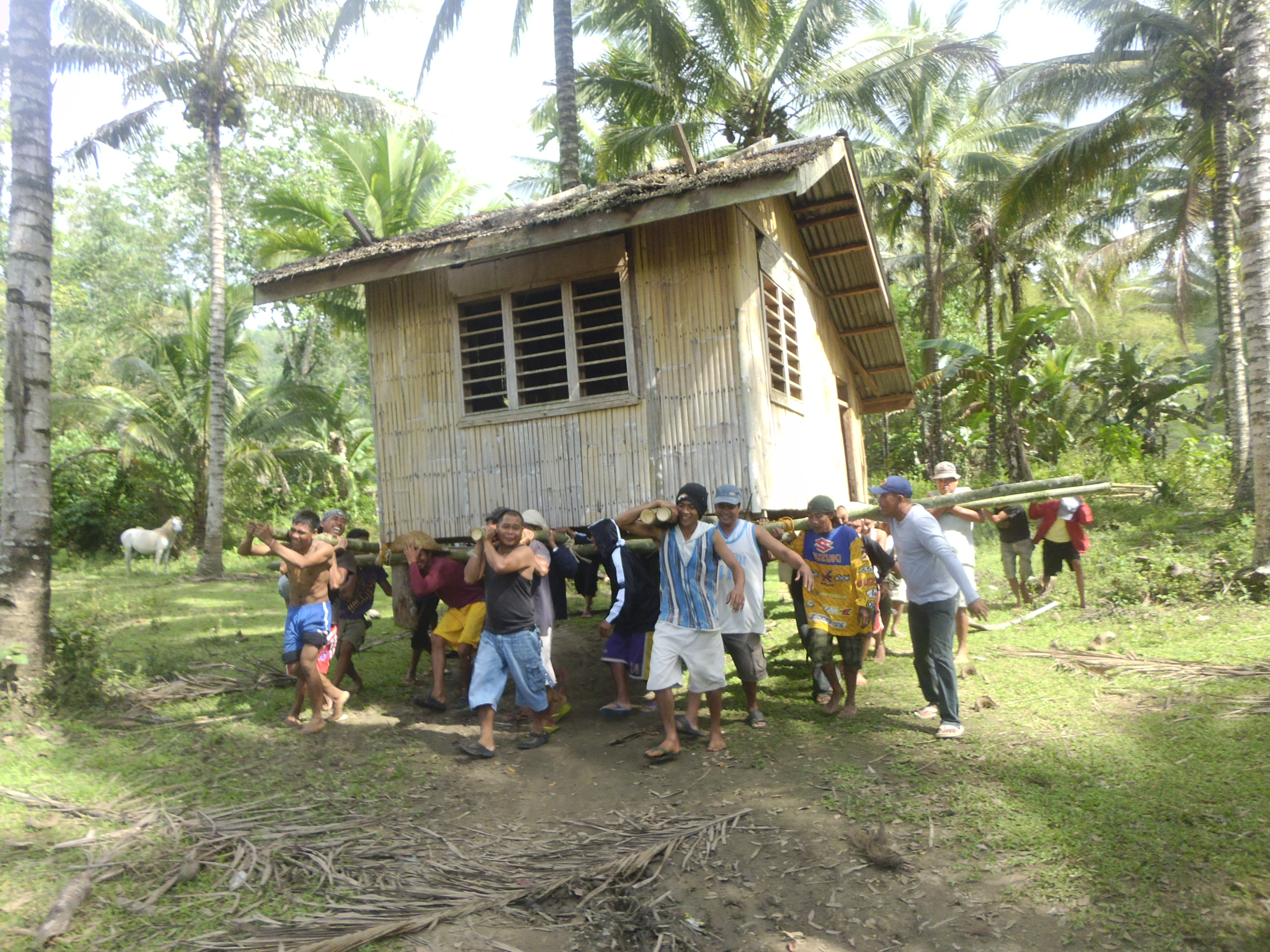
While in Bohol, teams had to convince ten people to carry a Nipa hut through the city of Tagbilaran.

Airdates: 14, 15, 16 & 21 September 2020

- Manila (Ninoy Aquino International Airport) to Panglao, Bohol (Bohol–Panglao International Airport)
- Loboc (JAD Cultural Center)
- Loboc (Ocho Food Stop)
- Loboc (Loboc River or Potato Field)
- Loboc (Ocho Food Stop)
- Alburquerque (Santisima Trinidad Ice Plant)
- Tagbilaran (Cathedral of St. Joseph the Worker)
- Dauis (Dauis Church)
- Panglao (BE Grand Resort)

This season's only Detour was a choice between כביסה (Laundry) or תפוחי אדמה (Potatoes). In Laundry, teams had to tightrope walk across the Loboc River while carrying a basket of laundry to receive their next clue. In Potatoes, teams had to walk on land skis, with the team member up front blindfolded. The non-blindfolded team member had to direct their partner to use a reach extender to grab three marked potatoes and place them in a basket on their back to receive their next clue. After either task, teams returned to Ocho Food Stop to find out if they had been U-Turned.

Additional tasks

- Outside Bohol–Panglao International Airport, teams voted for the team they wished to U-Turn.
- At JAD Cultural Center, teams had to climb a bamboo ladder up a mock coconut tree, retrieve a coconut, bring it down to a basket, and repeat until they retrieved six coconuts to receive their next clue. However, only one member of each team could climb at a time, racers would be attached to a counterweight that would make climbing up easy but climbing down hard, and teams had to swap climbers every three minutes.
- At Santisima Trinidad Ice Plant, teams had to use a fork, knife, spoon, and meat tenderizer to retrieve a ladle from a block of ice and receive their next clue.
- Outside the Cathedral of St. Joseph the Worker, teams had to convince ten people to carry a Nipa hut around Plaza Rizal in a tradition known as bayanihan. Teams then had to properly set up the interior of the hut to receive their next clue.
- Outside the Dauis Church, teams had to search through 18 jars of fermenting bagoong and find a small Amazing Race flag they could exchange for their next clue.

=== Leg 3 (Philippines → Netherlands) ===
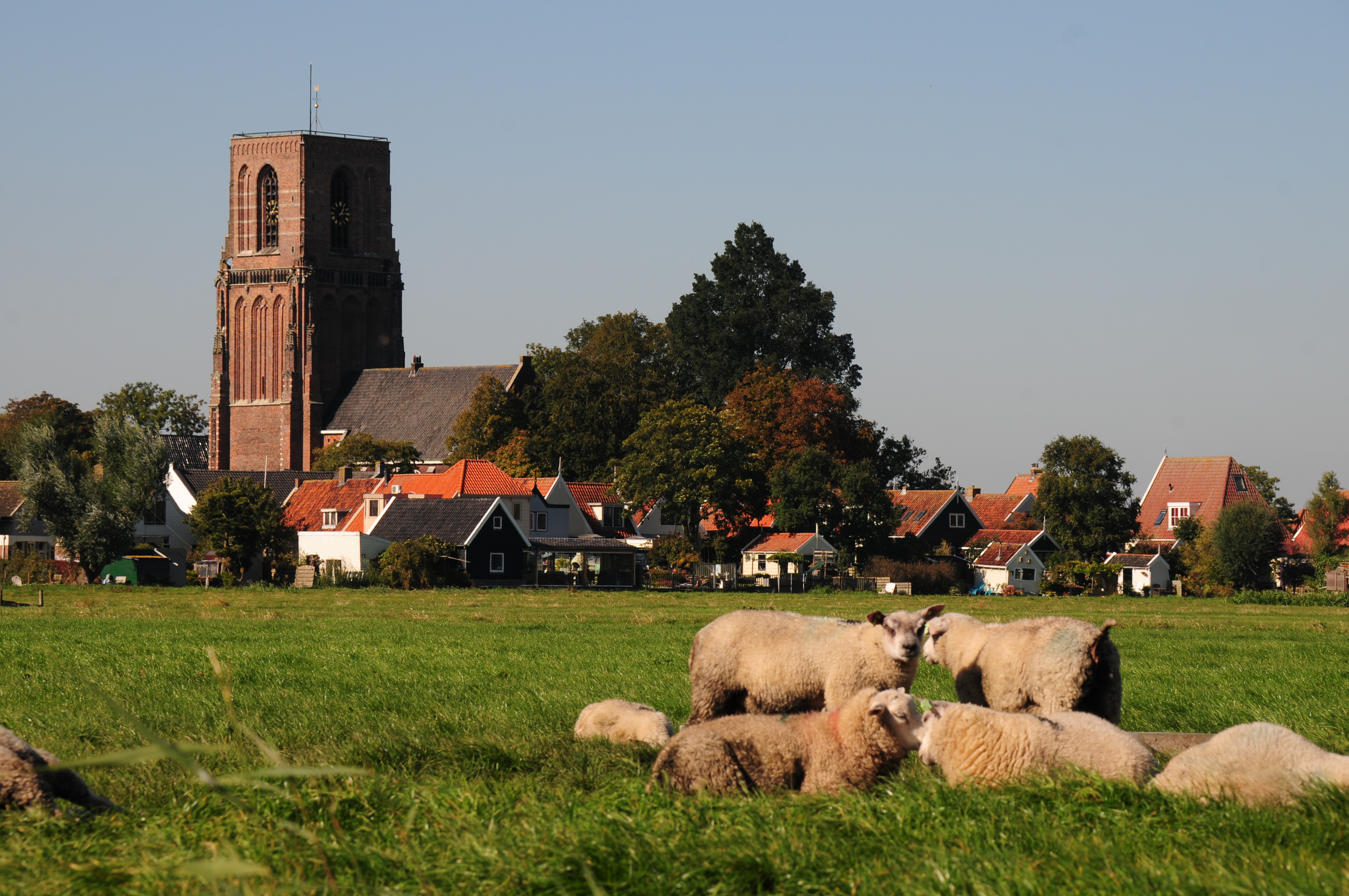
While in the Netherlands, teams traveled to the village of Ransdorp to vault across an irrigation ditch.

Airdates: 23, 24 & 28 September 2020

- Panglao (Bohol–Panglao International Airport) to Amsterdam, Netherlands (Amsterdam Airport Schiphol)
- Amstelveen (Ringdijk Bovenkerker Polder 7)
- Ransdorp (Rural Village Field)
- Amsterdam (Zuiderkerk and Nieuwmarkt)
- Amsterdam (Museum Van Loon)
- Katwoude (Irene Hoeve)
- Amsterdam (Museumplein)

Additional tasks

- In Amstelveen, teams had to sample 10 cheeses, carry two wheels of each cheese on a wooden stretcher to a station, and then place the correct cheese wheels beneath unmarked cheese samples to receive their next clue.
- In Ransdorp, teams had to look at a Snellen chart from a distance and then pole vault across an irrigation ditch, a regional sport called fierljeppen, to obtain the underlined letters and numbers one at a time to receive their next clue. Teams then voted for the team they wished to Yield.
- At Zuiderkerk, teams would find a decorated Christmas tree. They then had to bring a tree to Nieuwmarkt and replicate the Christmas tree to receive their next clue from Santa Claus. If teams were incorrect, they had to carry the tree back to the church before making another attempt.
- At Museum Van Loon, teams had to teach a passerby information about pieces of art in the museum and had to connect each artwork to Israel. Their person would then be quizzed on the art and had to answer three questions correctly so teams could receive their next clue.
- Outside Irene Hoeve, teams would discover if they had been Yielded. Teams then entered the shop and had to search a room full of klompen for one marked with an Amazing Race flag they could exchange for their next clue directing them to the Pit Stop, where the Yielded team had to wait out a 15-minute penalty.

=== Leg 4 (Netherlands → Armenia) ===
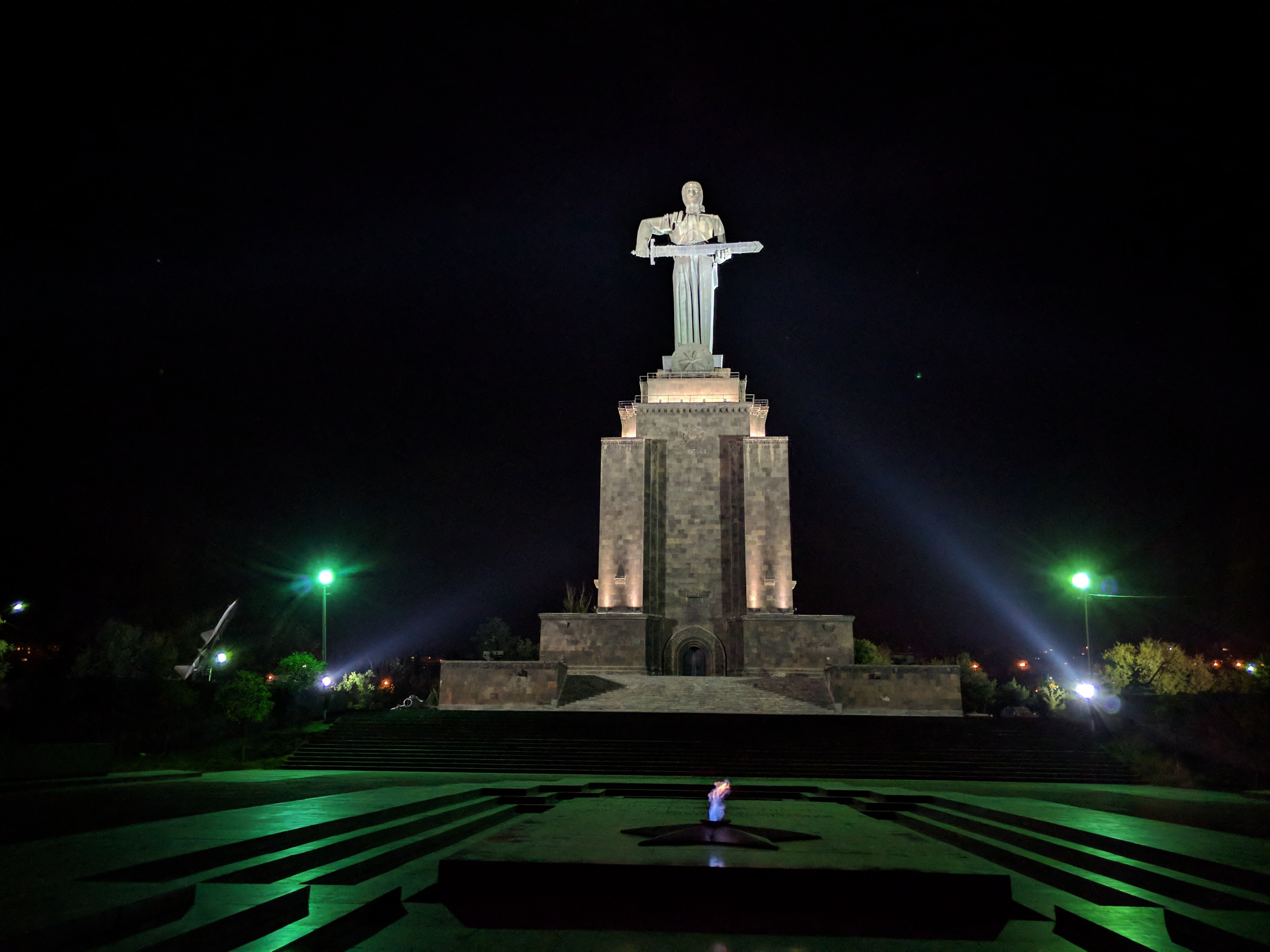
The first leg in Armenia finished at the monument of Mother Armenia.

Airdates: 3, 6, 10 & 13 October 2020

- Amsterdam (Amsterdam Airport Schiphol) to Yerevan, Armenia (Zvartnots International Airport)
- Arzni (Cliff)
- Arzni (Arzni Agro Farm)
- Yerevan (Bangladesh – Apartment Building)
- Yerevan (Parvana Restaurant)
- Yerevan (Circular Park – Vardan Mamikonian Statue)
- Yerevan (Armenian Center for Contemporary Experimental Art)
- Yerevan (Yerevan Vernissage)
- Yerevan (Mother Armenia)

Additional tasks

- In Arzni, one team member had to climb a cliff to reach images of seven Armenian inventions that they had to verbally describe to their partner through a walkie-talkie. The team member on the ground would be next to a board filled with images of inventions, each of which had a letter, and had to unscramble the letters to spell the name of a famous Armenian family, the Kardashians, to receive their next clue. Teams would then vote for the team they wished to Yield.
- At Arzni Agro Farm, teams had to stack hay bales to reach two white stork nests perched on a large haystack and place a colored egg in its associated nest to receive their next clue.
- In the neighborhood of Bangladesh, teams had to recreate a photograph of the Kardashians by borrowing listed items from apartments and finding people with similar ages to the people in the photograph to receive their next clue from a Kim Kardashian impersonator.
- Outside Parvana Restaurant, teams would discover if they had been Yielded. Then, one team member had to knead 30 buckets of lavash dough to receive their next clue. Meanwhile, their partner would be holding a stack of lavash on each hand, and if they dropped the bread, then the team would have to wait 10 minutes before resuming.
- At the Vardan Mamikonian Statue, one team member had to enter a plexiglass box and get covered in bugs and mealworms. Their partner then had to wheel the box to a series of tables, which they had to search for the right handle to open the box and receive their next clue.
- At the Armenian Center for Contemporary Experimental Art, teams had to convince a passerby to translate instructions written in Armenian to them so they could fold a large sheet of paper into a paper boat, meant to resemble Noah's Ark. Once complete, teams had to carry their boat to the Yerevan Vernissage and place it in a pool to receive their next clue directing them to the Pit Stop, where the Yielded team had to wait out a 15-minute penalty, from a man dressed as Noah.

=== Leg 5 (Armenia) ===
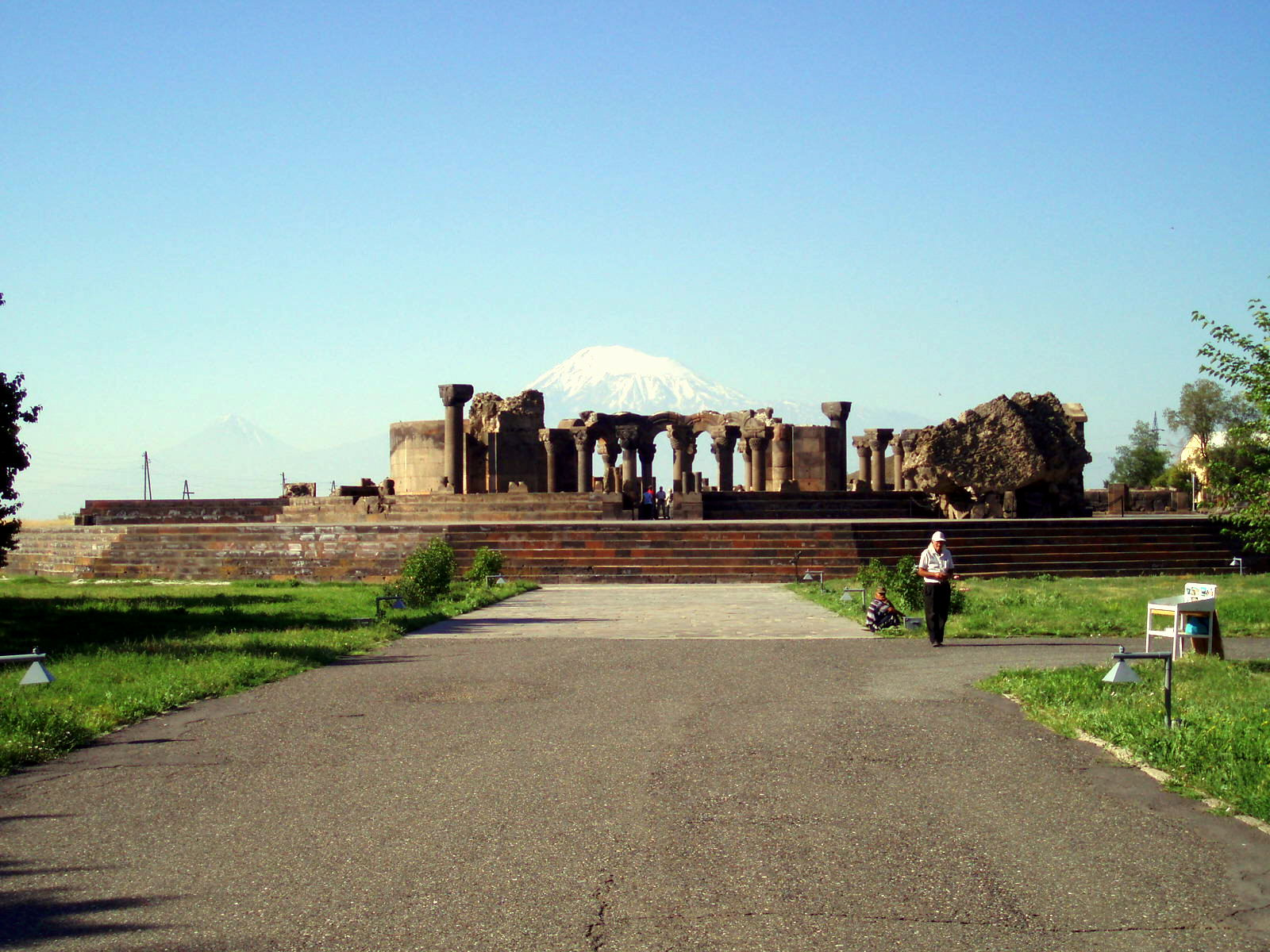
At the Zvartnots Cathedral, teams took part in a jousting Duel.

Airdates: 14, 17, 21 & 24 October 2020

- Geghadir (Field)
- Garni (Temple of Garni)
- Vagharshapat (Zvartnots Cathedral)
- Yerevan (Gum Market)
- Yerevan (Adora Restaurant)
- Yerevan (Komitas State Conservatory of Yerevan)
- Yerevan (Yerevan Cascade)

For this leg's Duel, teams competed in jousting. One member from each team had to sit on a barrel and use a sword to knock down their opponent. The first team to win two matches would receive their next clue, while the losing team had to wait for another team. The team that lost the final Duel had to wait out a 15-minute penalty.

Additional tasks

- In Geghadir, teams had to don a helmet and breastplate and then launch cabbages using a giant slingshot to knock down four knight cutouts to receive their next clue. Teams then voted for the team they wished to Yield.
- At the Temple of Garni, teams had to use a large hammer to push out the bottom disk from a stack of five large disks without toppling the stack until the bottom four were removed to retrieve their next clue.
- At Gum Market, teams had to memorize an example table with ten plates of fruit. Then, teams had to search a vast table with plates of fruit for the three plates missing from their own table to receive their next clue. If teams chose an incorrect plate, then one team member would have to consume one plate's contents before they could resume searching.
- At Adora Restaurant, teams would find out if they had been Yielded and then had to work with two students to hold up a disk with ropes and then stack blocks with Armenian letters until they spelled կՈՄԻՏԱՍ (Komitas) without toppling the stack to receive their next clue.
- At the Komitas State Conservatory of Yerevan, teams had to watch a dance and would then be asked a question about the performance. Teams had to choose an answer, uncover a step number listed next to their answer, and then make their way to the Yerevan Cascade to open the clue placed on the step number they got. If teams answered incorrectly, they would have to return to the conservatory and watch another performance. If they answered correctly, they could check into the Pit Stop atop the Cascade, but the Yielded team would first have to wait out a 15-minute penalty.

=== Leg 6 (Armenia → Chile) ===
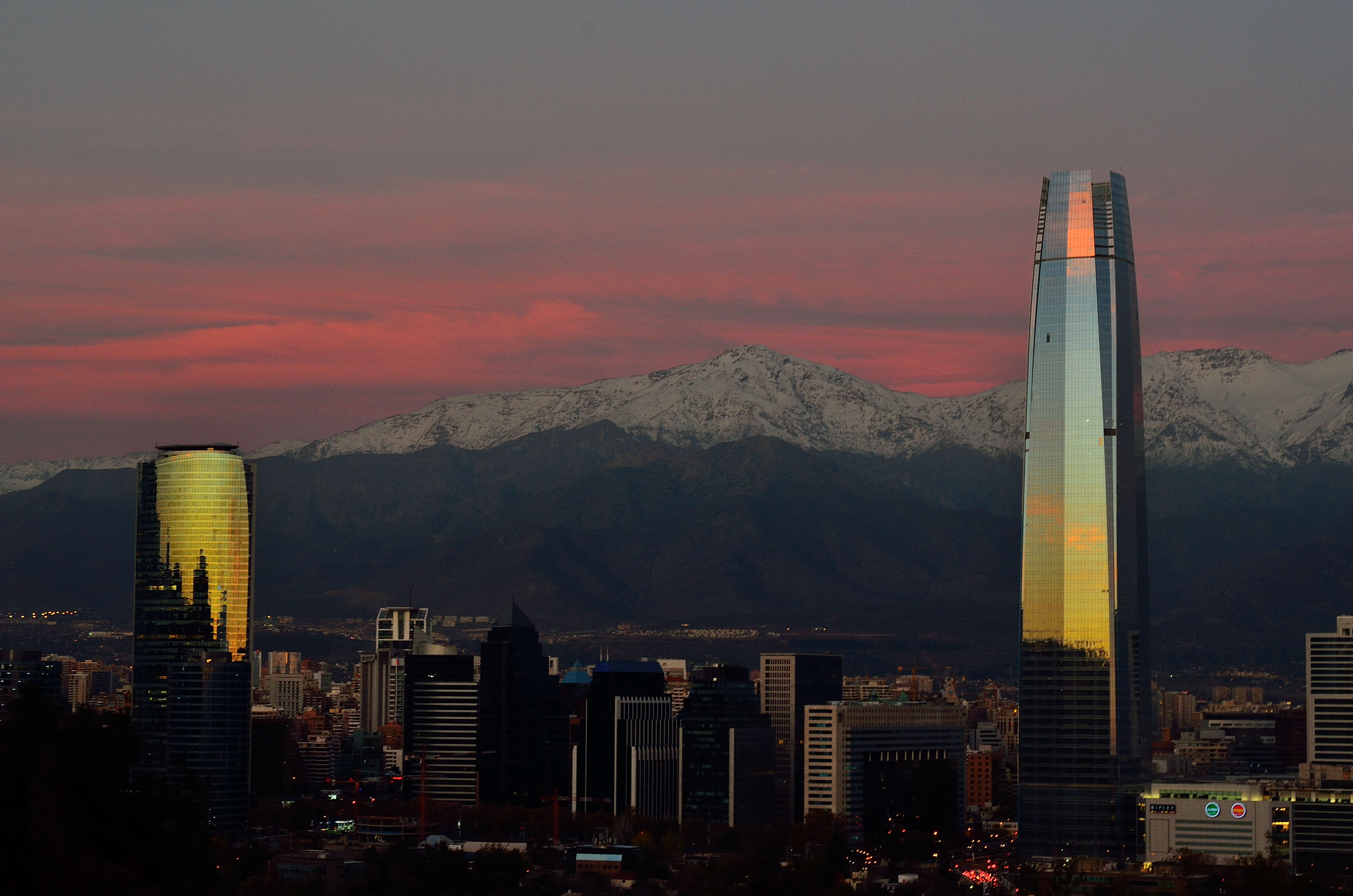
At the Gran Torre Santiago, teams had to decode a message revealing the location of the Pit Stop in Santiago.

Airdates: 24, 28 & 31 October 2020

- Yerevan (Opera Suite Hotel) (Pit Start)
- Yerevan (Zvartnots International Airport) to Santiago, Chile (Arturo Merino Benítez International Airport)
- Santiago (Plaza de Armas – Museo Histórico Nacional)
- Santiago (National Library of Chile)
- Santiago (Fluvial Park)
- Santiago (Estación Mapocho)
- Santiago (Museo Histórico y Militar de Chile (in Spanish))
- Santiago (Argomedo Performance)
- Santiago (Gran Torre Santiago)
- Santiago (Cerro Santa Lucía – Neptune Fountain (in Spanish))

For this leg's Duel, one member from each team had to stand on a rotating platform and throw one Chilean produce (rocoto, papa lisa, or caigua) past their opponent and into a net bearing the produce's name. The first team to win two matches would receive their next clue, while the losing team had to wait for another team. The team that lost the final Duel had to wait out a 15-minute penalty.

Additional tasks

- At Museo Histórico Nacional, team had to listen to a lecture about the four greats of Chilean poetry: Gabriela Mistral, Vicente Huidobro, Pablo de Rokha, and Pablo Neruda. Then, teams had to stack 50 books onto a board, encourage locals to translate familiar Israeli songs printed on the books' covers in Spanish, and carry the books to the National Library of Chile. Teams would have to figure out which poet wrote the books they were carrying based on the theme of their book's song and then stack them on a shelf with the correct poet to receive their next clue.
- At Fluvial Park, teams had two minutes to stack toy blocks while on an earthquake shaking table so that the blocks matched a picture to receive their next clue. Teams would then vote for the team they wished to Yield.
- At Museo Histórico y Militar de Chile, both team members had to dress up as a chinchinero, a local one-man band street performer, and play a tune in sync to receive their next clue.
- From Argomedo Performance, teams were driven in a classic car to the base of the Gran Torre Santiago, where they would discover if they had been Yielded and then find their next clue.
- At the Gran Torre Santiago, one team member had to don a glow suit and would find a coded message at the base of the building. They had to contort their body to form the poses, similar to flag semaphore, and their partner looking from the 61st floor would translate. When teams translated "the hill where the establishment of Santiago was announced awaits Ron Shahar", they would be able to find the Pit Stop, where the Yielded team had to wait out a 15-minute penalty.

=== Leg 7 (Chile) ===
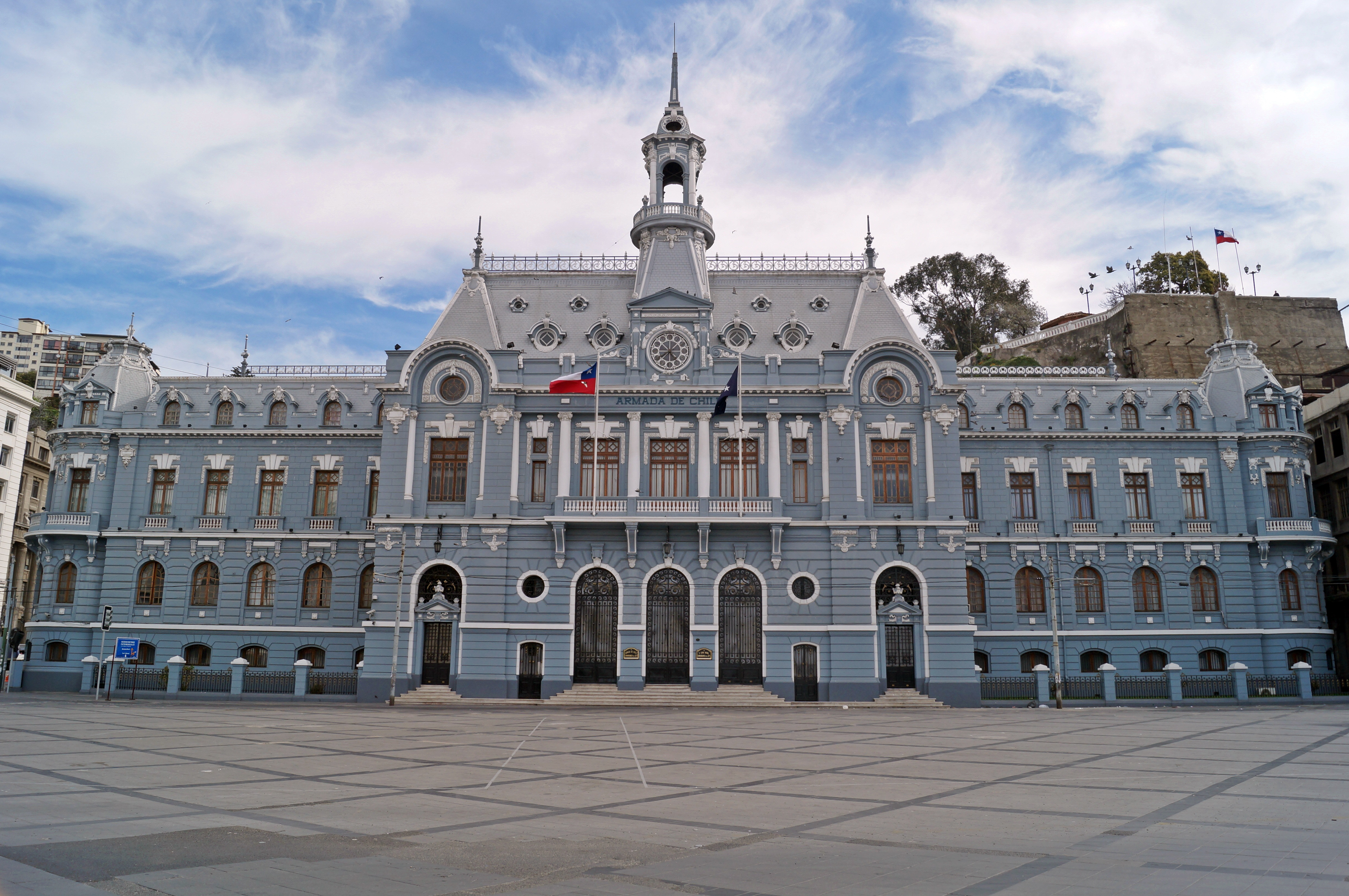
Sotomayor Square in Valparaíso was the site of the Pit Stop for the seventh leg.

Airdates: 1, 4, 7 & 8 November 2020

- Santiago (Sheraton Santiago) (Pit Start)
- Algarrobo (Playa Canelo)
- Algarrobo (San Alfonso del Mar)
- El Quisco (Canelo Park)
- Valparaíso (Ex Frigorífico)
- Viña del Mar (Viña del Mar Boardwalk)
- Valparaíso (Be The Juice Bar)
- Valparaíso (Pasaje Leighton)
- Valparaíso (Sotomayor Square)

For this season's final Duele, one member from each team had to swim across a section of the largest swimming pool in South America to their next clue while hooked to a fishing rod and held back by their opponent's partner. The losing team had to wait for another team, and the team that lost the final Duel had to wait out a 15-minute penalty.

In this season's only Roadblock, one team member had to climb up a wire bridge, which included sections of movable planks, without falling to retrieve their next clue.

Additional tasks

- At Playa Canelo, teams had to play bubble football against three locals with another local chosen as their goalie and score more goals within 10 minutes to receive their next clue. Teams then voted for the team they wished to Yield.
- At Ex Frigorífico, one team member had to turn on an incomplete light display of the flag of Chile. Once the lights turned off, they then had to direct their partner to turn on all of the unlit bulbs to receive their next clue. If teams were unsuccessful after an allotted time, the display would reset, and teams would have to wait out a 5-minute penalty before they make another attempt.
- At Viña del Mar Boardwalk, teams had to encourage 19 passersby to hold up a tube so teams could pour colored water from one end and fill a cutout of Chile in a map of South America to receive their next clue.
- At Be The Juice Bar, teams would discover if they had been Yielded. Teams then obtained a basket with newspaper cones filled churros from a nearby food truck and had eat every churro from a cone before they could search the newspaper for an image of their next Pit Stop, where the Yielded team had to wait out a 15-minute penalty. If the newspaper didn't include an image of the Pit Stop, teams would have to choose and eat another cone of churros.

=== Leg 8 (Chile → Ecuador) ===
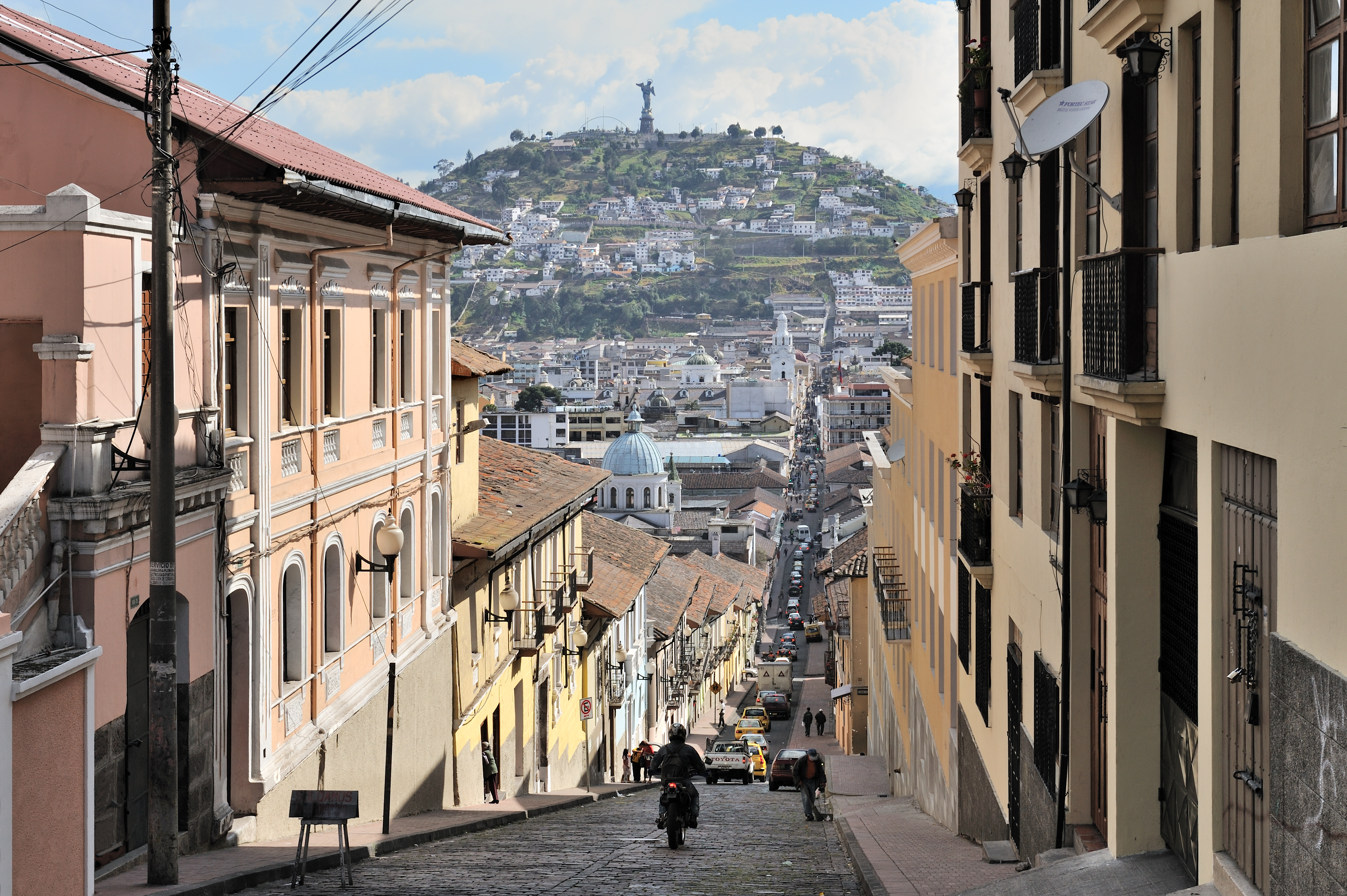
During the first leg in Ecuador, teams drove a kart down one of Quito's hilly streets.

Airdates: 11 & 14 November 2020

- Santiago (Sheraton Santiago) (Pit Start)
- Santiago (Arturo Merino Benítez International Airport) to Quito, Ecuador (Mariscal Sucre International Airport)
- Quito (The Lovers)
- Quito (Virgin of El Panecillo)
- Quito (Rumipamba Archaeological Park)
- Quito (Galapagos Street)
- Quito (Plaza de la Independencia)
- Quito (Fundación Niños de María)
- Quito (Centro de Arte Contemporáneo de Quito to Plaza de San Francisco)

Additional tasks

- At The Lovers, teams had to thaw frozen T-shirts to uncover the words printed on them (Evita, Like a Prayer, Material Girl), figure out that they all referenced Madonna, and deduce that their next clue was at the Madonna statue of Virgin of El Panecillo.
- At Virgin of El Panecillo, teams received a Nescafé Taster's Choice coffee break before they could continue racing.
- At Rumipamba Archaeological Park, teams voted for the team they wished to Yield.
- At Galapagos Street, one team member had to drive a wooden kart down a hill to a baker within 90 seconds while their partner held onto two cakes to receive their next clue. Teams would then discover if they had been Yielded.
- At Plaza de la Independencia, both team members had to don a box with QR codes and encourage passersby to scan the codes with their smartphones. The passerby could only describe the photo the code produced, and teams had to figure out which code produced a photo with a minor difference (a Native Ecuadorian had two earrings instead of one) and travel to the location listed on the photo to find their next clue.
- At Fundación Niños de María, teams would discover if they had been Yielded.
- At Centro de Arte Contemporáneo de Quito, teams boarded a Chiva bus that would take them to the Pit Stop. There, teams had five minutes to search for the ticket to disembark, with the Yielded teams having to wait out a 15-minute penalty before checking in. If teams were unsuccessful, the bus would depart and teams would have to wait for it to return to the plaza before they could continue searching.

=== Leg 9 (Ecuador) ===
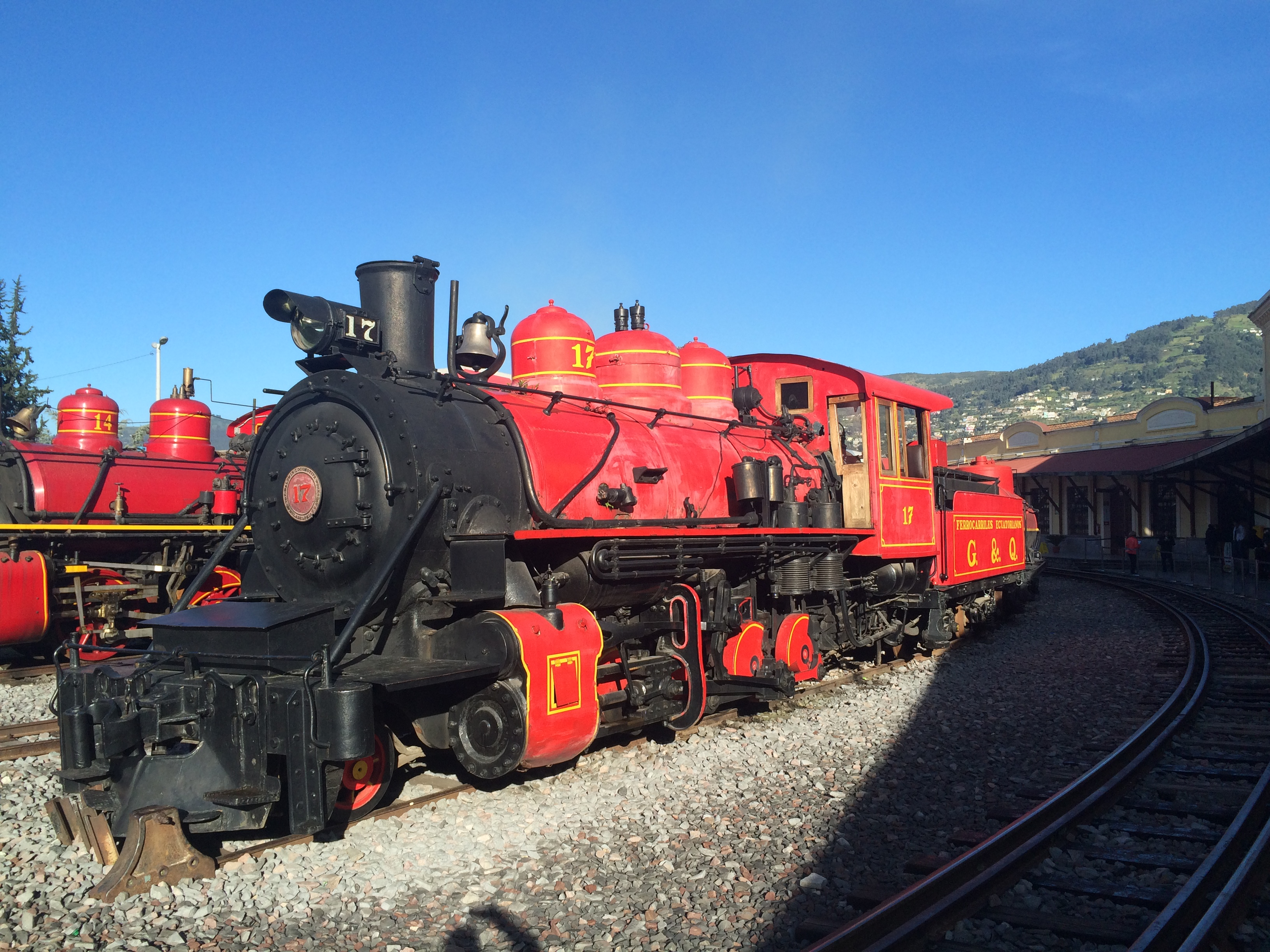
Teams finished their second leg in Ecuador at the Chimbacalle Train Station.

Airdates: 18, 21 & 22 November 2020

- Quito (JW Marriott Hotel Quito) (Pit Start)
- Tena (Viewpoint)
- Tena (Picnic Area)
- Pichincha Province (Molinuco Resort)
- Amaguaña (Casa Hacienda)
- Amaguaña (Guna Flores)
- Quito (Chimbacalle Train Station)

Additional tasks

- In Tena, teams would experience a healing ritual from a shaman, which involved drinking two bowls of aloe vera gel, to receive their next clue.
- At the picnic area, one team member had to listen to animal sounds on an MP3 player and reiterate the sounds to their partner. That person had to find the correct animals and transfer them to their partner, who had to put them into boxes, to receive their next clue. Teams then voted for the team they wished to Yield.
- At Molinuco Resort, teams had to pick up a basket of food and would then find their loved ones with whom they would enjoy a picnic before receiving their next clue.
- At Casa Hacienda, one team member had to hang upside-down from a pole and describe an image of a totem pole to their partner in a tipi, who had to recreate the totem pole by stacking blocks to receive their next clue. Teams would then discover if they had been Yielded.
- At Guna Flores, teams had to sort 12 types of roses and correctly count each type to receive their next clue directing them to the Pit Stop, where the Yielded team had to wait out a 15-minute penalty.

=== Leg 10 (Ecuador → Brazil) ===
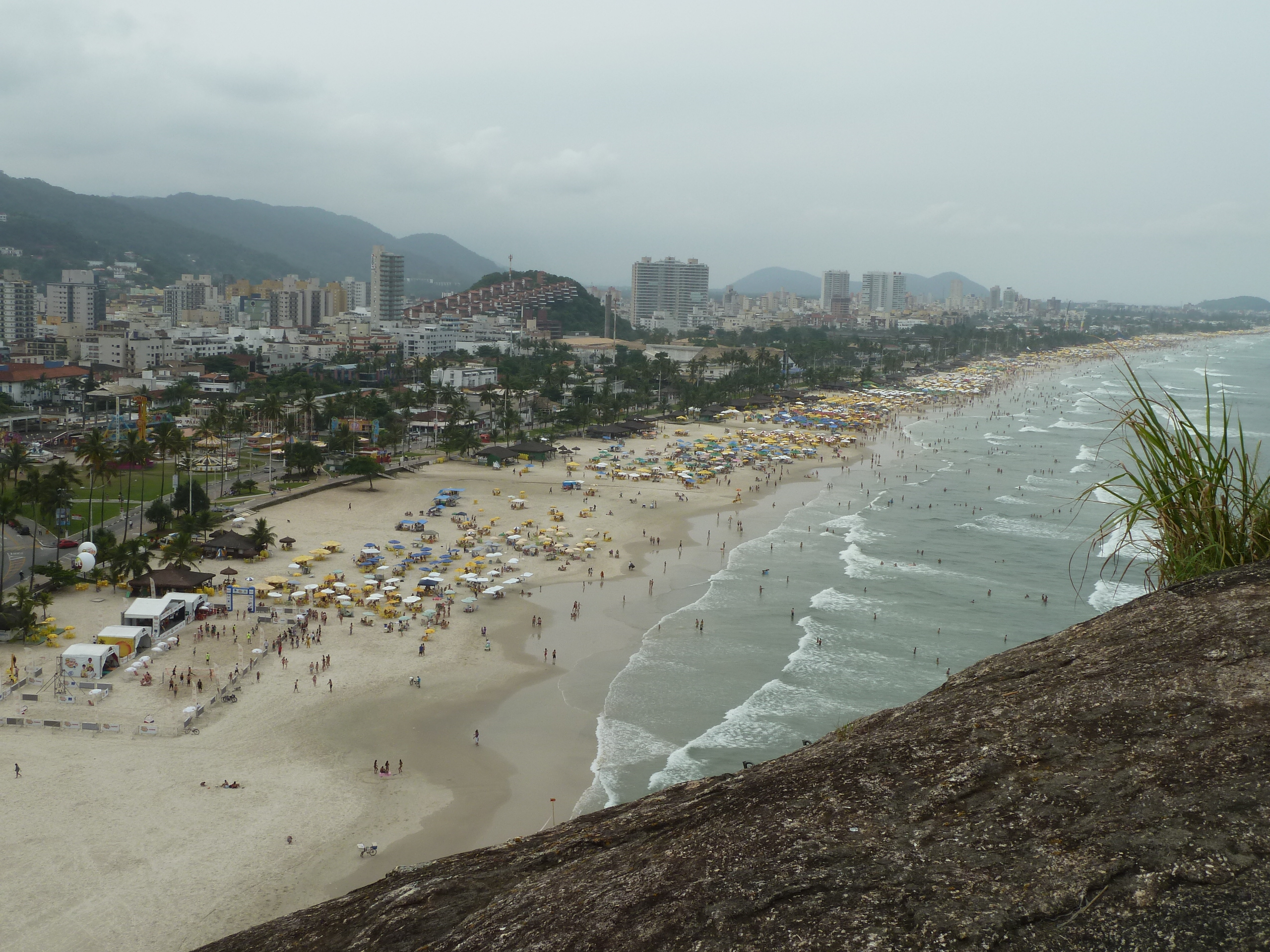
At Praia da Enseada in Guarujá, teams had to play telephone.

Airdates: 24 & 28 November 2020

- Quito (JW Marriott Hotel Quito) (Pit Start)
- Quito (Mariscal Sucre International Airport) to São Paulo, Brazil (São Paulo/Guarulhos International Airport)
- Guarujá (Tortuga)
- Guarujá (Praia da Enseada (in Portuguese))
- Santos (Praça Mauá (in Portuguese))
- Santos (Praia do Gonzaga)
- Santos (Praça das Bandeiras)
- Santos (Museu de Pesca)

Additional tasks

- Outside the JW Marriott Hotel Quito, teams were given a tablet computer that played "Tudo Bom" by Static & Ben El Tavori and had to figure out that they were traveling to São Paulo, Brazil.
- At Tortuga, each team member had to study a map that depicted the amounts of money in sacks floating offshore. Teams then had to use a water bike to retrieve 20 sacks that totaled exactly ₪1,000,000 to receive their next clue.
- At Praia da Enseada, teams received a Nescafé Taster's Choice coffee break before they could continue racing. Teams then had to bury 20 people in the sand and play telephone. Once team member would say a sentence in Hebrew, and the buried people had to pass the sentence down to the other team member, who had to find an object mentioned in the sentence and deliver it to a beachgoer to receive their next clue. Teams then voted for the team they wished to Yield.
- At Praça Mauá, team would find a human-sized cup filled with maté and had to serve all of the liquid inside to passersby before they could retrieve their next clue from inside the cup.
- At Praia do Gonzaga, teams would discover if they had been Yielded.
- At Praça das Bandeiras, one team member had to enter a giant ball pit filled with globes marked with various countries and find six globes marked with the countries they visited during the season. They then had to pass the globes to their partner, who had to place the globes next to the marked countries' national flags to receive their next clue directing them to the Pit Stop, where the Yielded team had to wait out a 15-minute penalty.

=== Leg 11 (Brazil) ===
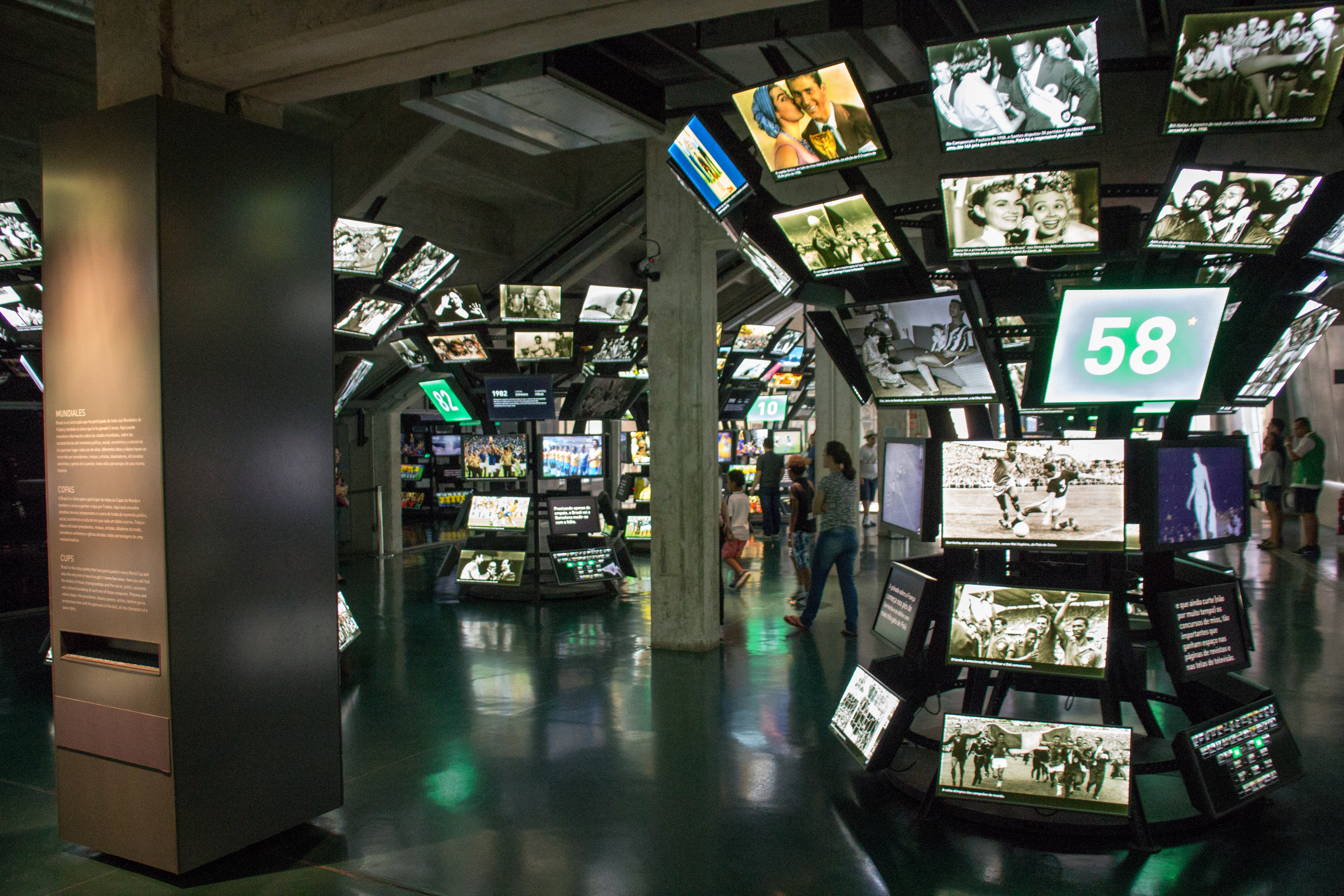
In São Paulo, teams had to search the Football Museum for the names of Israeli football players.

Airdates: 29 November, 1 & 2 December 2020

- São Paulo (São Paulo Yacht Club)
- São Paulo (Balsa Bar)
- São Paulo (Guarapiranga Ecological Park)
- São Paulo (Escola de Samba Vai-Vai)
- São Paulo (Pacaembu Stadium – Football Museum)
- São Paulo (Ipiranga Monument)

Additional tasks

- At São Paulo Yacht Club, teams had to standup paddleboard to a floating platform, pick up beach supplies, return to shore without falling into the water, and set up the supplies so that they matched the setup on the platform to receive their next clue.
- At Balsa Bar, one team member had to don a pipe that would extend their arm and re-create five selfies, in reference to São Paulo native and Instagram co-founder Mike Krieger, of nearby landmarks described to them by their partner over a phone to receive their next clue.
- At Guarapiranga Ecological Park, teams had to navigate through a maze of cages by finding an object with their picture in each section to receive their next clue.
- At Escola de Samba Vai-Vai, one team member had to read cards listing souvenirs in Portuguese from a balcony over the deafening sound of samba dancers and musicians to their partner, who had to translate them into Hebrew. The team member on the balcony then had to find the listed items to receive their next clue.
- At the Football Museum, teams had to find names of Israeli football players in the museum and sum the numbers next to each player. When teams thought they had the sum, they would be sent to one of five colored sections of Pacaembu Stadium and would find their next clue if they gave the correct sum of 2589.

=== Leg 12 (Brazil → Israel) ===
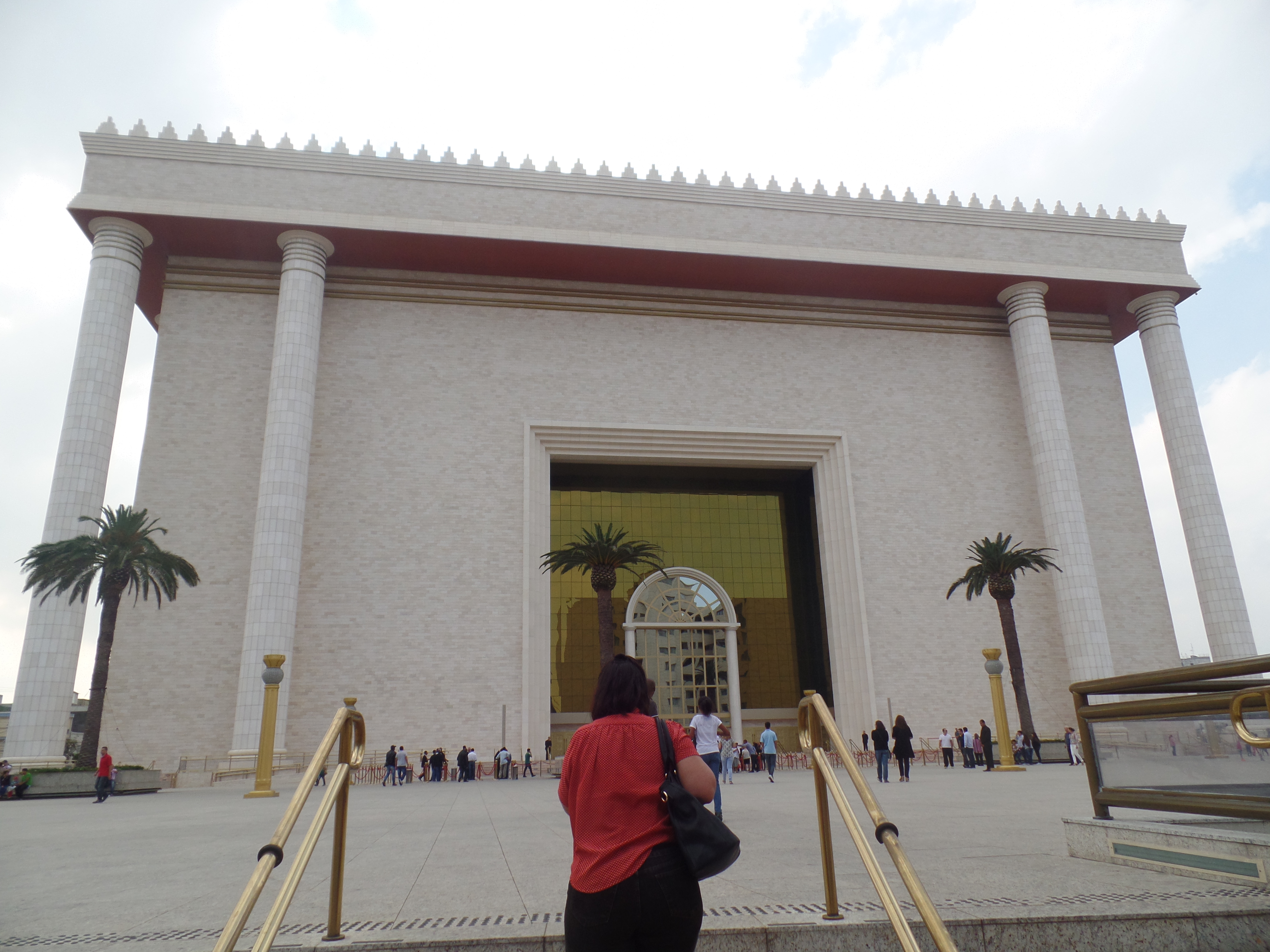
Before heading back to Tel Aviv, teams visited the Temple of Solomon.

Airdate: 8 December 2020

- São Paulo (Building)
- São Paulo (Jockey Chacara Municipal Park (in Portuguese))
- São Paulo (Sociedade Hipica Paulista)
- São Paulo (Temple of Solomon)
- São Paulo (São Paulo/Guarulhos International Airport) to Tel Aviv, Israel (Ben Gurion Airport)
- Tel Aviv (Kenshoo Tel Aviv)
- Tel Aviv (Beit Lessin Theater)

Additional tasks

- At the start of the leg, teams rode a helicopter over São Paulo before traveling to Jockey Chacara Municipal Park, where they had to convince twenty pairs of people to change into swimwear with their team's photograph in a mobile changing station and then get photographed to receive their next clue.
- On Jockey Chacara Municipal Park's soccer field, teams had to use a long pole to arrange 16 strips of fabric with Hebrew letters to form a lyric from a familiar Israeli song about Brazil ("País Tropical" by Jorge Ben) to receive their next clue.
- At Sociedade Hipica Paulista, one team member had to walk across a tightrope with their partner on their shoulders to retrieve their next clue.
- At the Temple of Solomon, teams were informed that they were still racing. Teams arrived at their next location in the order they arrived at the temple.
- At Kenshoo Tel Aviv, teams had to unlock a tablet that would tell them the location of the Finish Line by inputting a code where the first two digits were the sum of all of their placements at the end of the previous legs. When the tablet was unlocked, Ron Shahar informed the teams to travel to the theater established in the 1980s in the first Hebrew city: Beit Lessin Theater in Tel Aviv.

== Ratings ==
Data courtesy of the Israeli Rating Committee, according to individuals aged 4+ from the general population.

No.	Air date	Episode	Percentage	Nightly Rank	Jewish Household Percentage	Viewers	Ref
1	6 September 2020	The Launch Event	7.2%	1	17.1%	469,000	
2	7 September 2020	The All Stars vs. the Rookies	6.9%	1	17.8%	453,000	
3	9 September 2020	First Elimination	6.4%	1	15.2%	421,000	
4	14 September 2020	Shani's Exercise	6.5%	3	16.3%	423,000	
5	15 September 2020	Vova & Alla Against Everyone	6.9%	1	17.2%	450,000	
6	16 September 2020	The All Stars War	6.8%	1	16.1%	442,000	
7	21 September 2020	Dramatic Elimination	7.4%	1	16.0%	487,000	
8	23 September 2020	The Move that Changed Everything	5.4%	4	12.4%	351,000	
9	24 September 2020	The Storm Continues	5.9%	3	13.4%	383,000	
10	28 September 2020	Painful Elimination	7.5%	3	15.2%	490,000	
11	3 October 2020	The Mountain of Screams	5.5%	3	11.7%	357,000	
12	6 October 2020	The Kardashians	5.6%	4	13.2%	366,000	
13	10 October 2020	The Cruel Mission	6.0%	3	13.0%	391,000	
14	13 October 2020	Surprising Elimination	4.5%	5	10.2%	297,000	
15	14 October 2020	The Accident	5.2%	3	10.5%	340,000	
16	17 October 2020	Battle of Knights	6.2%	3	13.9%	404,000	
17	21 October 2020	The Sweet Mission	5.7%	3	13.4%	372,000	
18	24 October 2020	Elimination Before South America	6.5%	3	13.7%	425,000	
19	28 October 2020	Adventure in Chile	5.3%	3	12.2%	348,000	
20	31 October 2020	Elimination in Chile	6.2%	2	14.7%	407,000	
21	1 November 2020	The Event that Turned the Season	5.2%	3	11.9%	338,000	
22	4 November 2020	Shani's Injury	4.9%	5	12.7%	322,000	
23	7 November 2020	The Mission that Dismantled the Teams	5.9%	3	13.1%	389,000	
24	8 November 2020	The Fall of Yael & Yosiel	4.8%	5	10.8%	317,000	
25	11 November 2020	Neta in Intensive Care	5.5%	3	13.9%	363,000	
26	14 November 2020	Elimination Episode	5.3%	4	13.0%	348,000	
27	18 November 2020	Amazon Animals	4.8%	4	11.9%	315,000	
28	21 November 2020	The Families Join	<5.1%	>5	11.4%	320,000	
29	22 November 2020	Elimination Episode	<4.4%	>5	9.6%	269,000	
30	24 November 2020	Final Country	4.5%	4	10.5%	292,000	
31	28 November 2020	The Craziest Elimination in the World	5.4%	4	11.7%	354,000	
32	29 November 2020	The "Selfie" Mission	5.9%	3	13.5%	389,000	
33	30 November 2020	Episode Collection	<3.9%	>5	7%	202,000	
34	1 December 2020	The Ticket to the Final	5.3%	3	12.2%	345,000	
35	2 December 2020	Who Will Be the Final Three?	5.3%	4	12.4%	350,000	
36	7 December 2020	24 Hours to the Final	<4.3%	>5	7.8%	202,000	
37	8 December 2020	The Great Final	6.7%	1	13.9%	437,000	
