= Geghadir =

Geghadir or Gekhadir may refer to:

- Geghadir, Aragatsotn, Armenia
- Geghadir, Kotayk, Armenia
- Geghadir, Shirak, Armenia
