= Football Museum =

A Football Museum is a museum dedicated to the group of sports called football, including association football. It can refer to:

- Football Museum (São Paulo) – Association football museum in São Paulo, Brazil
- National Football Museum – Association football museum in Manchester, England
- Scottish Football Museum – Association football museum in Glasgow, Scotland
- Football Museum of Wales – Association football museum in Wrexham, Wales
- German Football Museum – Association football museum in Dortmund, Germany
- Museo del Calcio ("football museum") – Association football museum in Florence, Italy
