= Beit Lessin Theater =

Theater in Tel Aviv, Israel

Coordinates: 32°4′46″N 34°46′25.31″E

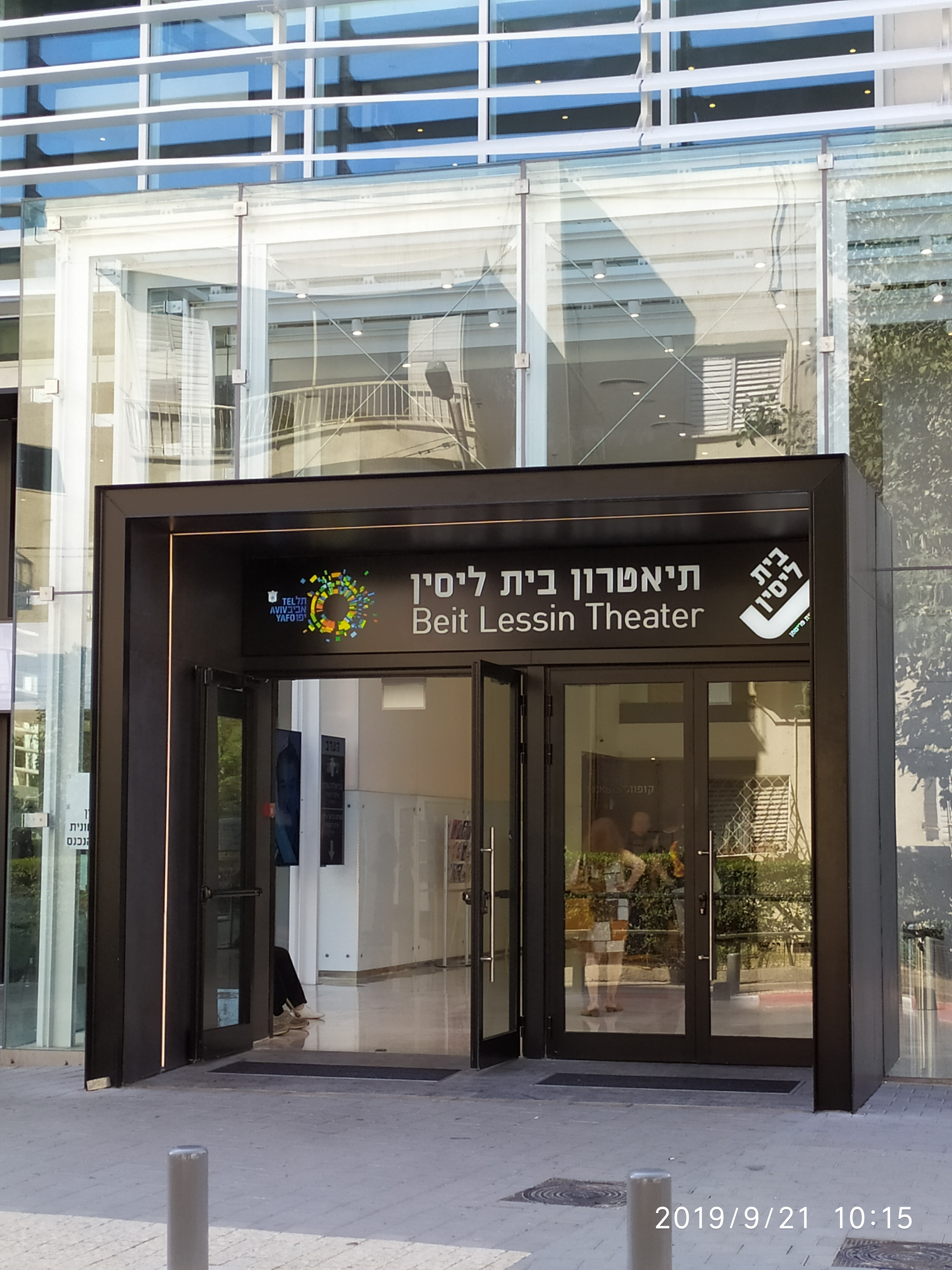
Beit Lessin Theater after renovation works

Beit Lessin Theater (Hebrew: תיאטרון בית ליסין, translit: Teatron Bet Lessin) is a theater in Tel Aviv, Israel.

== History ==
The theater was established in 1980 by Yaakov Agmon for the Histadrut.

Over the years the theater has shown over a thousand contemporary American and European plays, as well as original productions. In 1993, Tzipi Pines started managing the theater. It was separated from the Histadrut and started showing mostly original Israeli material reflecting the political and social situation in Israel.

In 2003, the theater moved from Lessin House to the old residence of the Cameri Theater after it was remodeled. This venue having more seats allowed larger and more expensive plays to be produced, such as Chicago and Guys and Dolls.

A number of theater's productions and people won the Israeli Theater Prize.

In 2020, the theater hosted the finale for HaMerotz LaMillion 8.

== See also ==
- Theater of Israel
