= Virgin of El Panecillo =

Sculpture in Quito, Ecuador

Coordinates: 0°13′44″S 78°31′07″W

Virgin of El Panecillo

The Virgin of El Panecillo (in Spanish: Virgen del Panecillo), also known as the Virgin of Quito from the sculpture of the same name, is a monument in Quito, Ecuador. It is located on the top of the hill of El Panecillo, a loaf-shaped hill in the heart of the city and serves as a backdrop to the historic center of Quito.

With a total height of 135 feet (41 meters) including the base, it is the highest statue in Ecuador and one of the highest in South America (taller than the Christ the Redeemer statue in the Brazilian city of Rio de Janeiro). It is also the tallest aluminum statue in the world.

== History ==
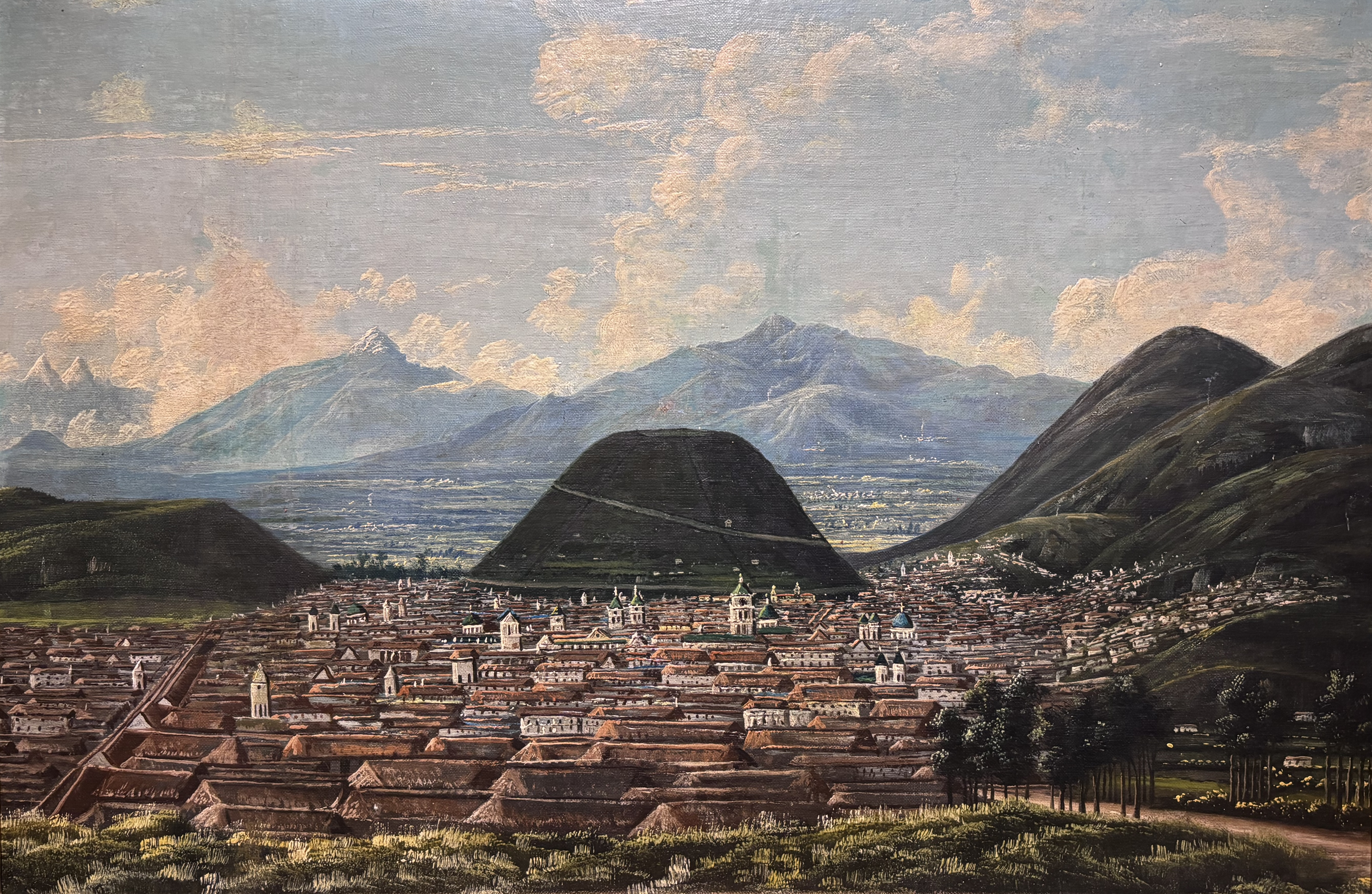
El Panecillo hill in the 19th century. Quito (c. 1889), attributed to Rafael Salas. National Museum of Ecuador.

In the 1950s, local authorities and religious leaders stood looking at El Panecillo, a loaf-shaped, 656-foot-high (200 meters) hill in central Quito. They agreed that the hilltop, visible throughout the city, was the perfect place to erect a statue. After years of debate, they decided that the statue would be a large replica of the Virgin of Quito, a 48-inch-tall wooden sculpture created by Bernardo de Legarda in 1734.

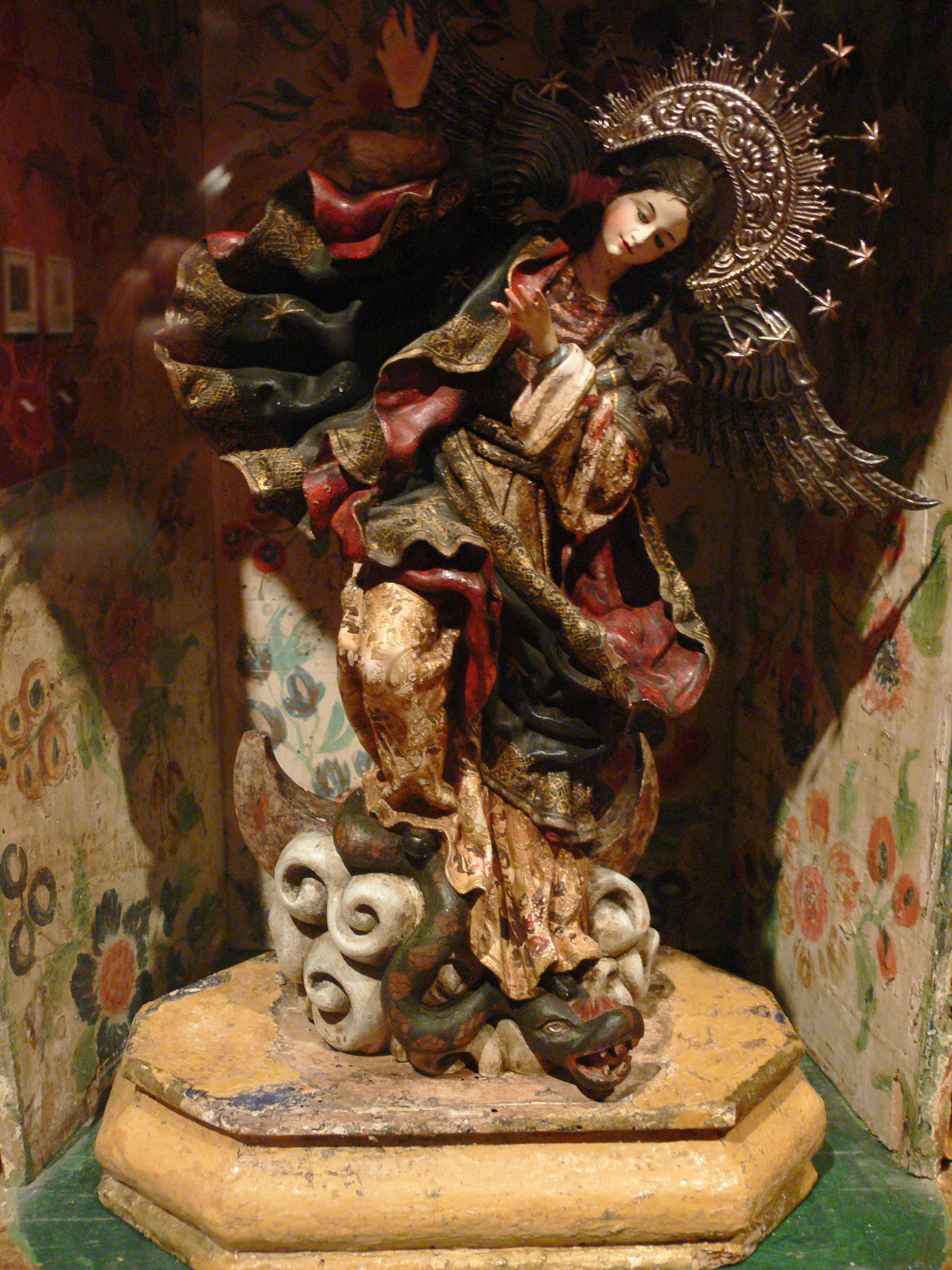
House altar with the Virgen de Quito (18th century) by Bernardo de Legarda. Wood, polychromy. Ethnological Museum, Berlin.

Designed and built by the Spanish sculptor Agustín de la Herrán Matorras, the statue is made from 7,400 pieces of aluminum, with each piece clearly numbered. The statue was then disassembled, shipped to Ecuador, and assembled again on top of the base. The statue was finished on March 28, 1975.

== In popular culture ==
The Virgin of El Panecillo has become one of Quito's main tourist attractions, with 180-degree views of the city from its viewing platforms. It is also the site of annual Nativity illuminations and a novena. The statue appears in the closing credits of the Hollywood film Proof of Life. Promotional posters for the Ecuadorian film Behind You show a woman in place of the statue.

== Gallery ==
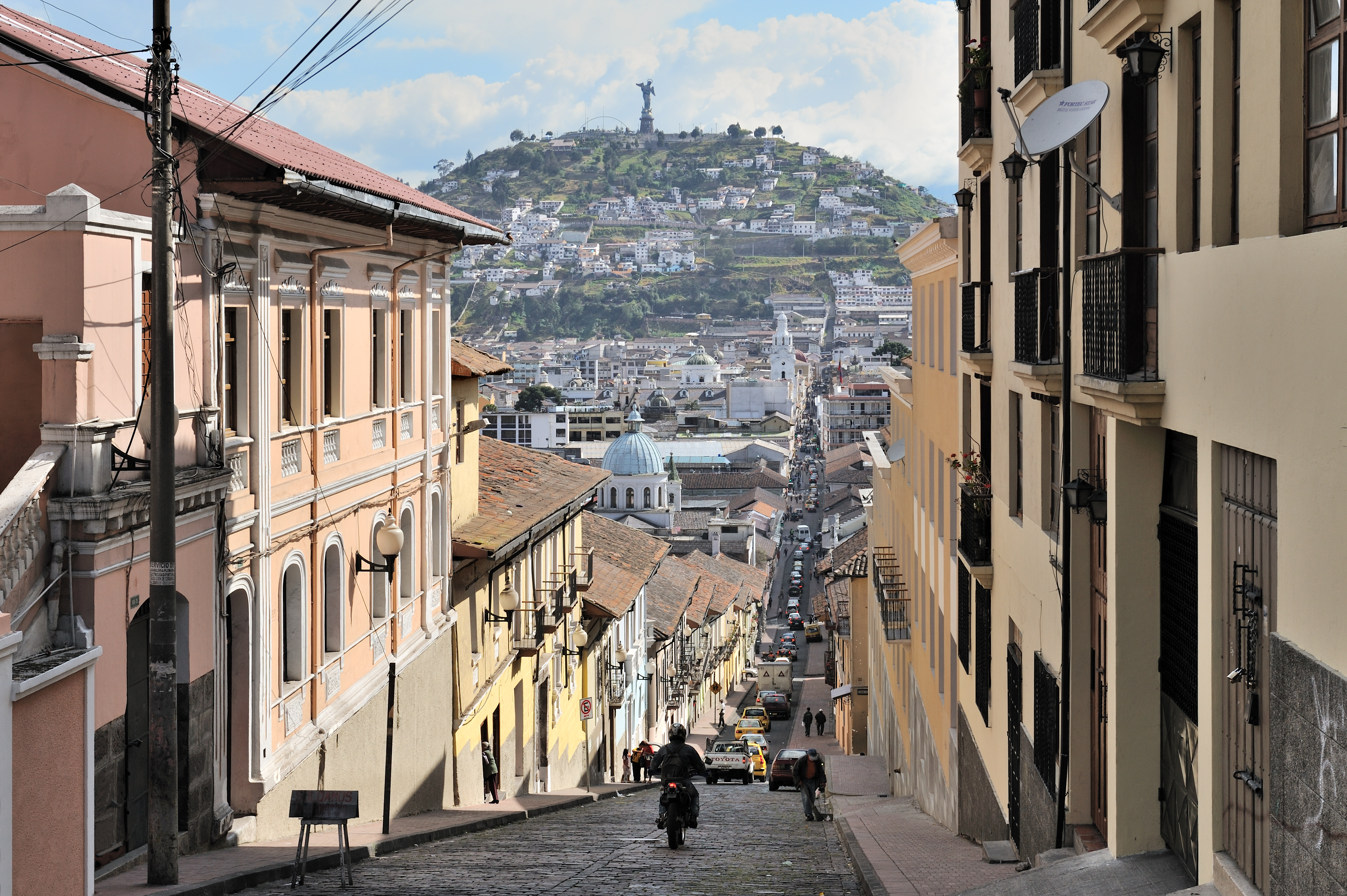
View from the north end of the Old Town, in García Moreno street.

A close-up of the dragon at the feet of the Virgin of El Panecillo (it follows conventional depictions of the Woman of the Apocalypse).

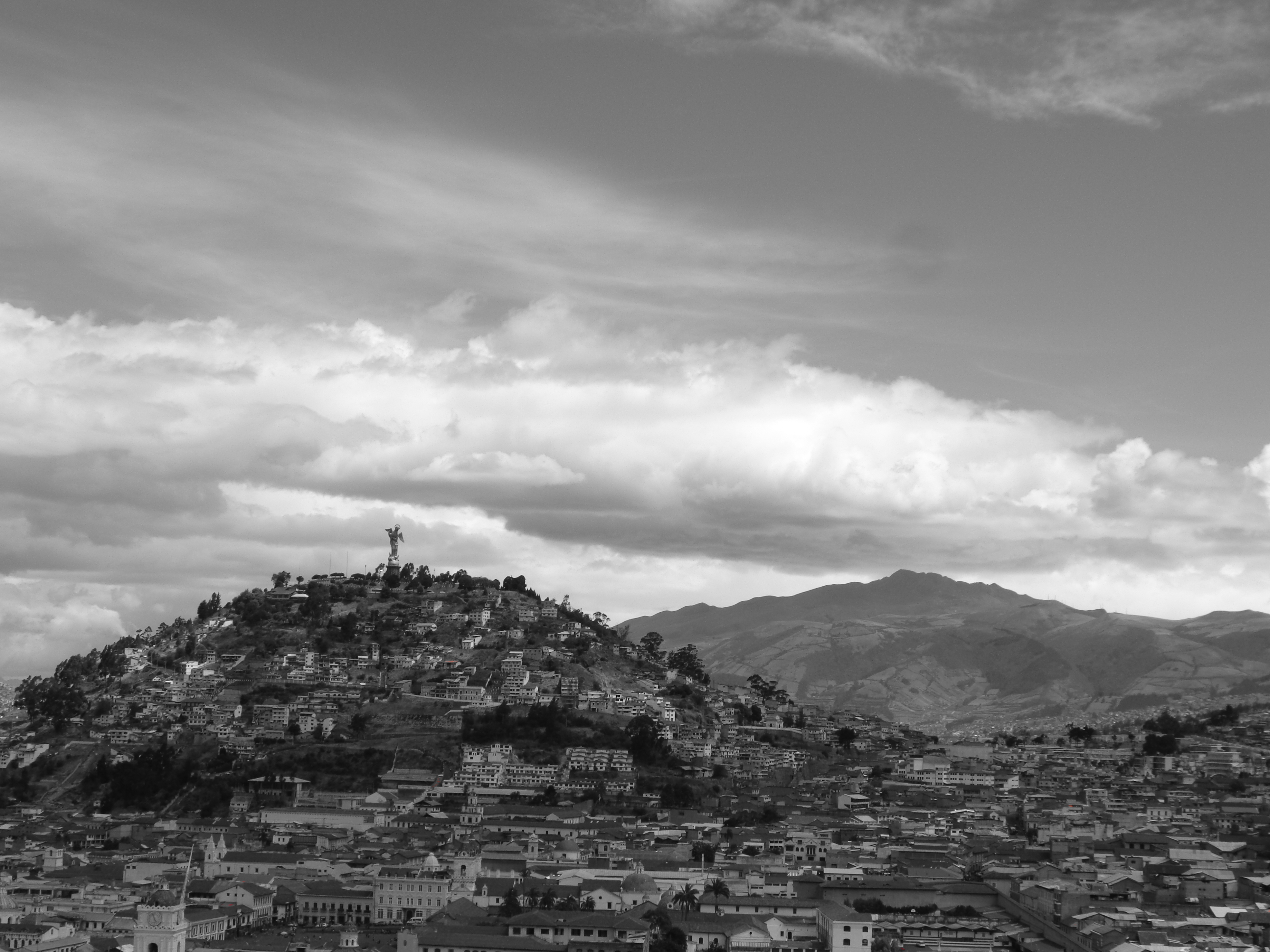
View from Esmeraldas street in the Old Town.

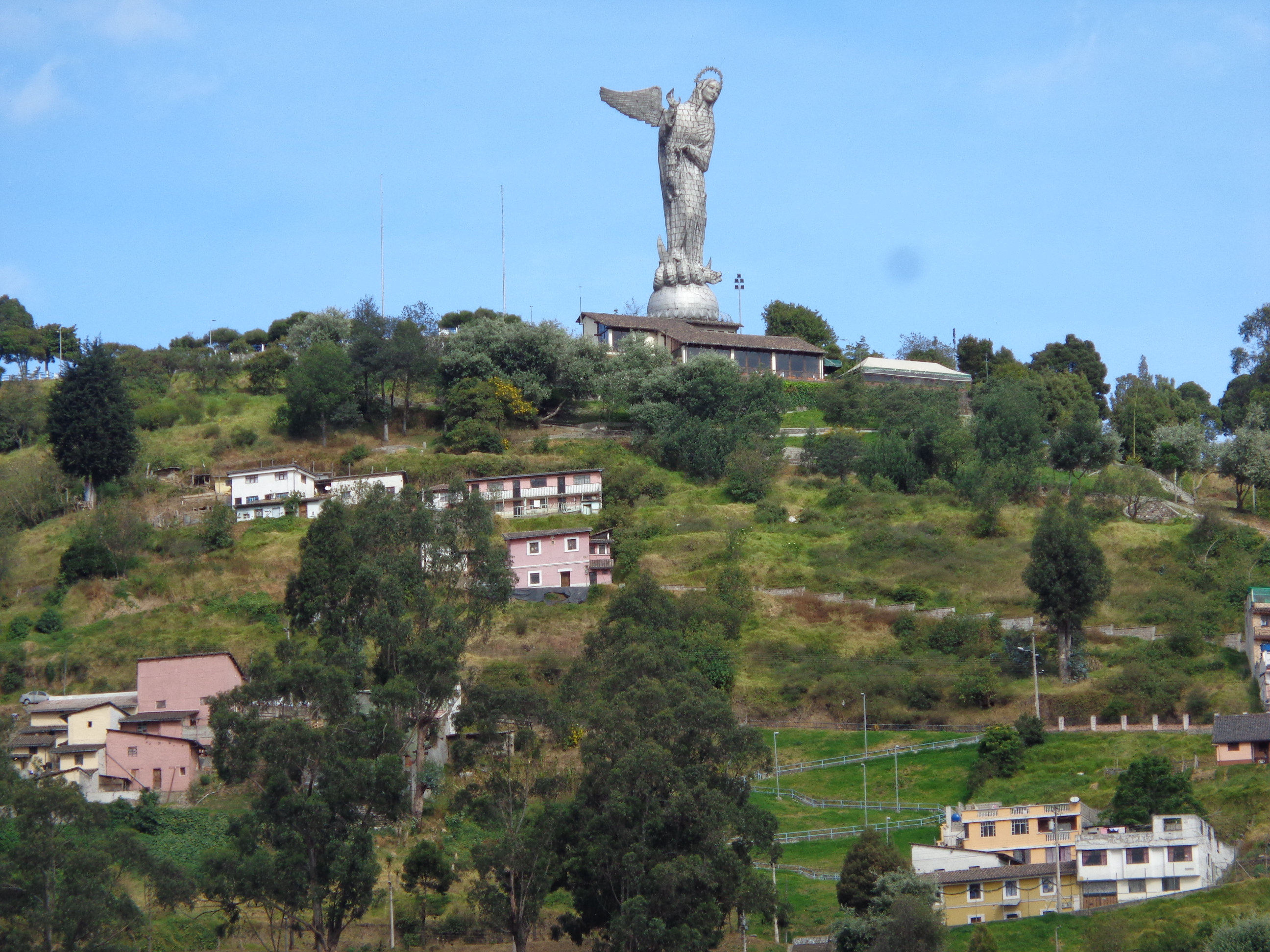
Northern view of the Virgin of El Panecillo.

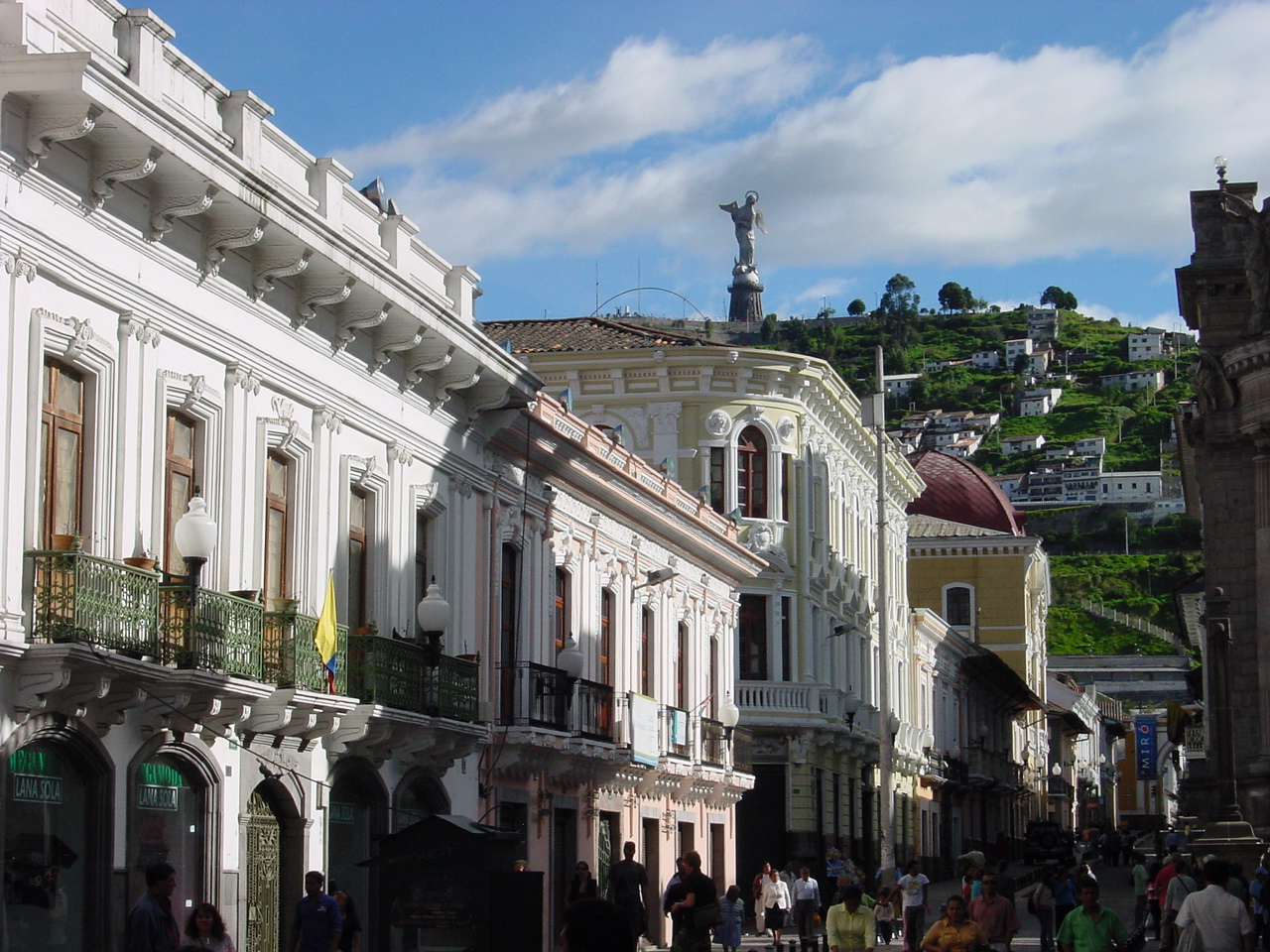
View from the Iglesia de la Compañía, in García Moreno Street.

View at night, from the West.

View at night, from the South.

View at night, from the East.
