= Football Museum (São Paulo) =

Museum in São Paulo, Brazil

- Museu do Futebol
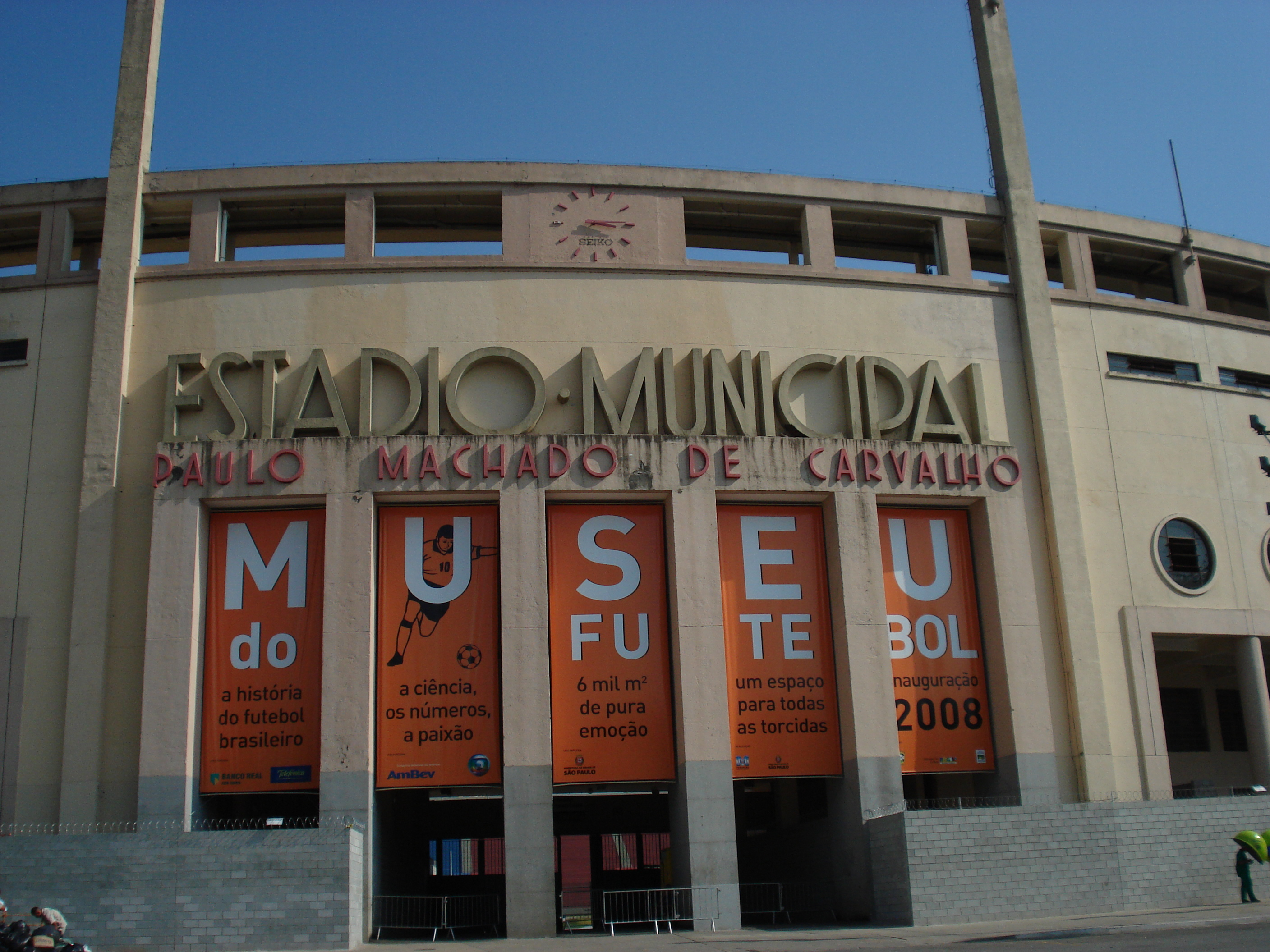
- Location: São Paulo, Consolação, Brazil
- Website: Official website

The Football Museum (Portuguese: Museu do Futebol) is a space in the city of São Paulo, Brazil dedicated to the most different subjects involving the practice, history and curiosities revolving around football in Brazil and in the world. This cultural space was built inside Pacaembu Stadium, located at Charles Miller Square in the Pacaembu neighborhood, on the west side of the city. The work was carried out by a consortium formed by the municipality and the São Paulo state government and inaugurated on September 29, 2008, with the presence of Pelé. From one of the exhibition rooms it is possible to admire the lawn of the stadium from above.

In the museum, visitors have the opportunity to understand how a sport of English origin, practiced by white members of the elite, gradually became a sport characteristic of all Brazil by adhering mestizo and popular traits of the Brazilian culture.

The museum tells the history of football from its beginning until the present days and its relations with arts and the life of people. Visitors have access to didactic and illustrative information on the sport and to interactive visual and sound experiences.

== Features ==
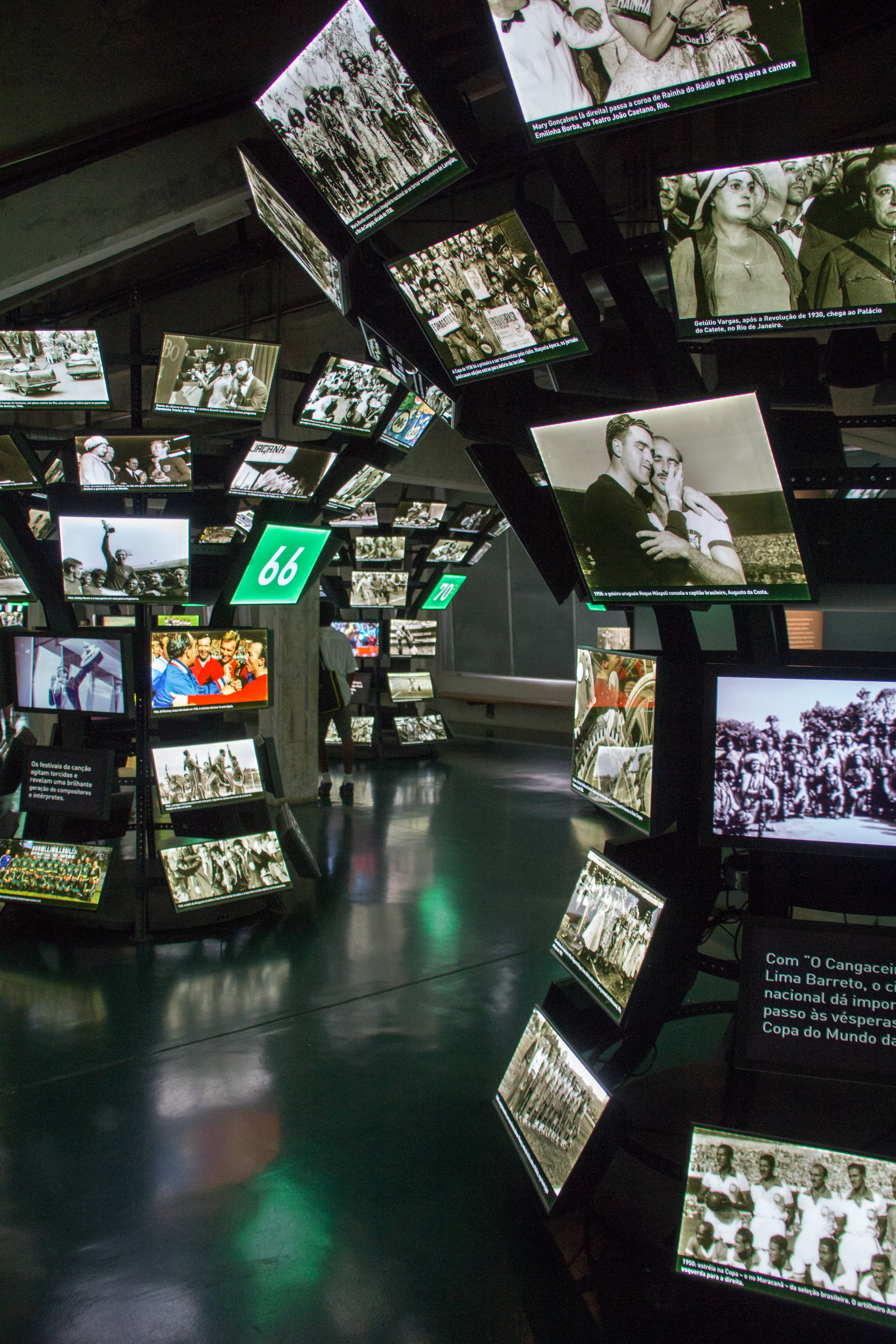
One of the exhibition rooms

The Football Museum seeks to investigate, preserve and communicate football as a cultural expression in Brazil. It is located in an area of 6,900 square metres (74,000 sq ft) on the reverse of the stands of the Pacaembu Stadium. The main exhibition is distributed in 15 rooms, accessible to people with disabilities and that can be visited with the support of downloadable audio guides for smartphones available in Portuguese, English and Spanish. Since 2013, the museum also hosts the Brazilian Football Reference Centre, in which the first public library specialised in football in Brazil is located, holding more than 4,000 titles among books, periodicals, catalogs, films and documentaries on DVDs. There are also spaces for temporary exhibitions, a shop and a bar.
