= Geghadir, Kotayk =

Geghadir Գեղադիր
- Location within Armenia
- Coordinates: 40°9′23″N 44°39′4″E
- Country: Armenia
- Province: Kotayk

Population (2011)
  - Total: 738
- Time zone: UTC+4 ( )

Geghadir (Armenian: Գեղադիր), known as Kyarpichlu until 1935, is a village in the Kotayk Province of Armenia located on the Yerevan–Garni road. The ancestors of the inhabitants came from Van, Khnus, Kars, and Bitlis in 1918–1924. Before that, the village was primarily populated by Turkic-speaking Muslims (i.e. Azerbaijanis).
