= Virgin of Quito =

Wooden sculpture by Bernardo de Legarda

Virgin of Quito, Virgin of the Apocalypse, Legarda's Virgin
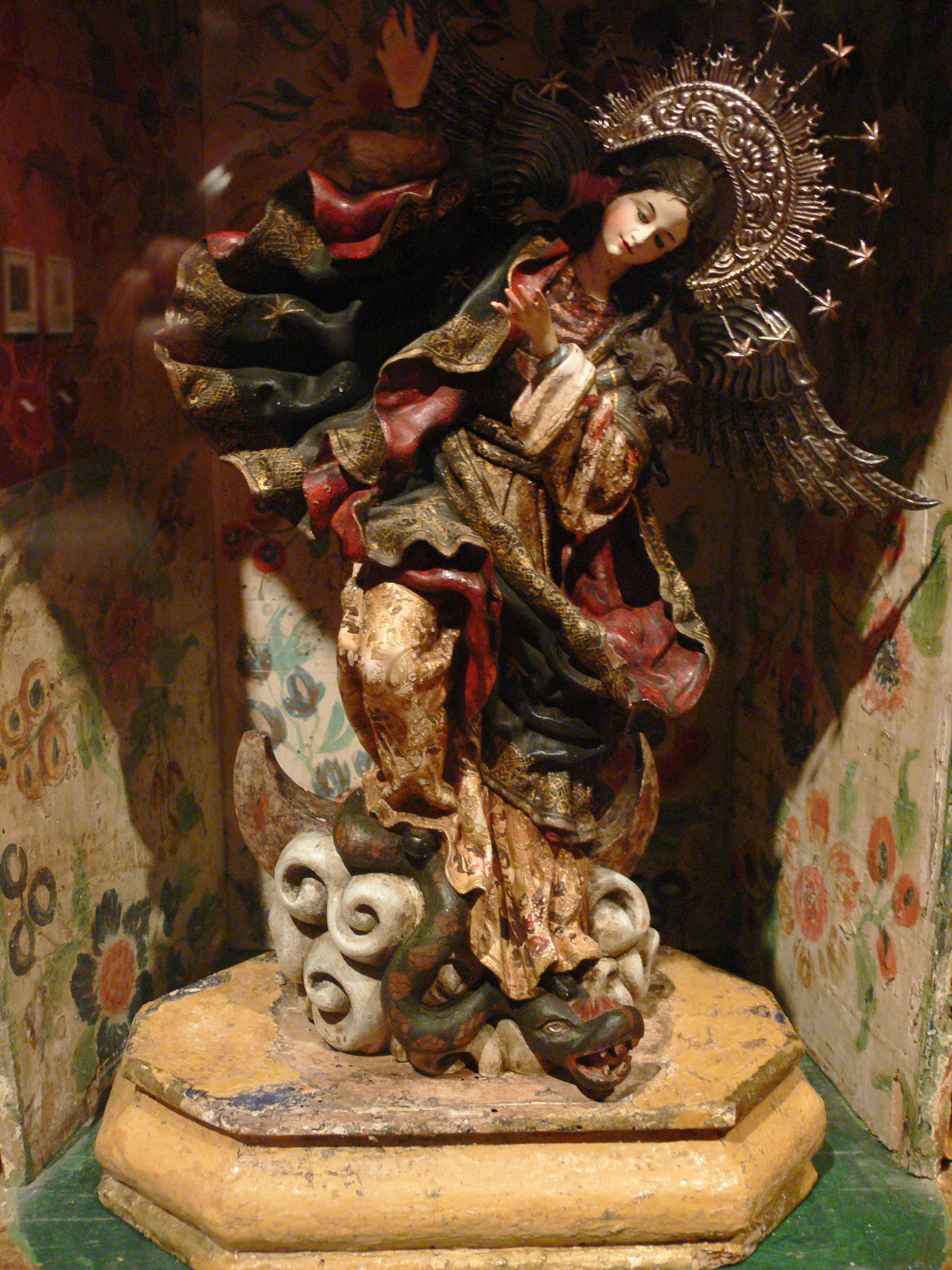
- Virgin of Quito by Bernardo de Legarda, 18th century.
- Artist: Bernardo de Legarda (ca. 1700-1773)
- Year: 1734
- Type: Wood, polychrome, silver (diadem), gold leaf
- Movement: Quito School
- Dimensions: 120 cm (47 in)
- Location: Church and Convent of St. Francis, Quito, Ecuador

Herrán Matorras' Virgin of El Panecillo (1976) on El Panecillo is a large replica of the sculpture.

The Virgin of Quito (Spanish, La Virgen de Quito) — also known as the Virgin of the Apocalypse, Winged Virgin of Quito, Dancing Madonna, and Legarda's Virgin — is a wooden sculpture by the Quiteño artist Bernardo de Legarda (ca. 1700-1773) which has become the most representative example of the Quito School of art, developed in the Ecuadorian capital during the Spanish colonial era. This particular Virgin became a popular cult image which is still venerated — via innumerable replicas — throughout the northern Andes.

The original 1734 work was conceived and commissioned as a Lady of the Immaculate Conception and is venerated at the altar of the Church and Convent of San Francisco in Quito, Ecuador.

== Description ==
The composition of the 120-centimeter-high sculpture is derived from the biblical description of the Woman of the Apocalypse. As described in the Revelation of Saint John (12:1-2), the woman was “clothed in the sun”. Also in accordance with the text, she has a crescent moon under her feet and a silver diadem bearing 12 stars is on her head. After battling a dragon — i.e., Satan, with the apple of original sin in his mouth — she has trampled and subdued the beast with a heavy silver chain which she holds loosely in her open hands. She has been given silver wings for escape. Probably influenced by 16th century European prints, such as that of Albrecht Dürer’s Apocalypse series, the “dancing” Virgin seems to float and gestures with open hands to her right amid an abundance of flouncing folds conveying both flight and ecstasy. Her mantle is of deep blue and bears silver stripes at the bottom. According to Michael Handelsman, "unlike the fair-skinned European Virgins, she clearly has the facial features and coloring of a mestiza". The work was signed and dated by its creator.

A larger version of the work, by the same artist, is venerated in the Catedral de Nuestra Señora de la Asunción (Cathedral Basilica of Our Lady of the Assumption, Popayán) in Popayán, Colombia. This larger Virgin, known as Nuestra Señora de la Asunción de Popayán (Our Lady of the Assumption of Popayán), strikes a more exaggerated “dancing” pose atop a crescent moon and serpent, and prepares to strike the latter with a lightning bolt, which replaces the earlier work's heavy silver chain. Both of these figures carry the iconographic trappings more of the Woman of the Apocalypse than of an “Immaculate Conception” (the colors [blue and white], the floating) or an “Assumption” (the wings, the upraised arms), although elements of all three Marian "epithets" are present.

== History ==
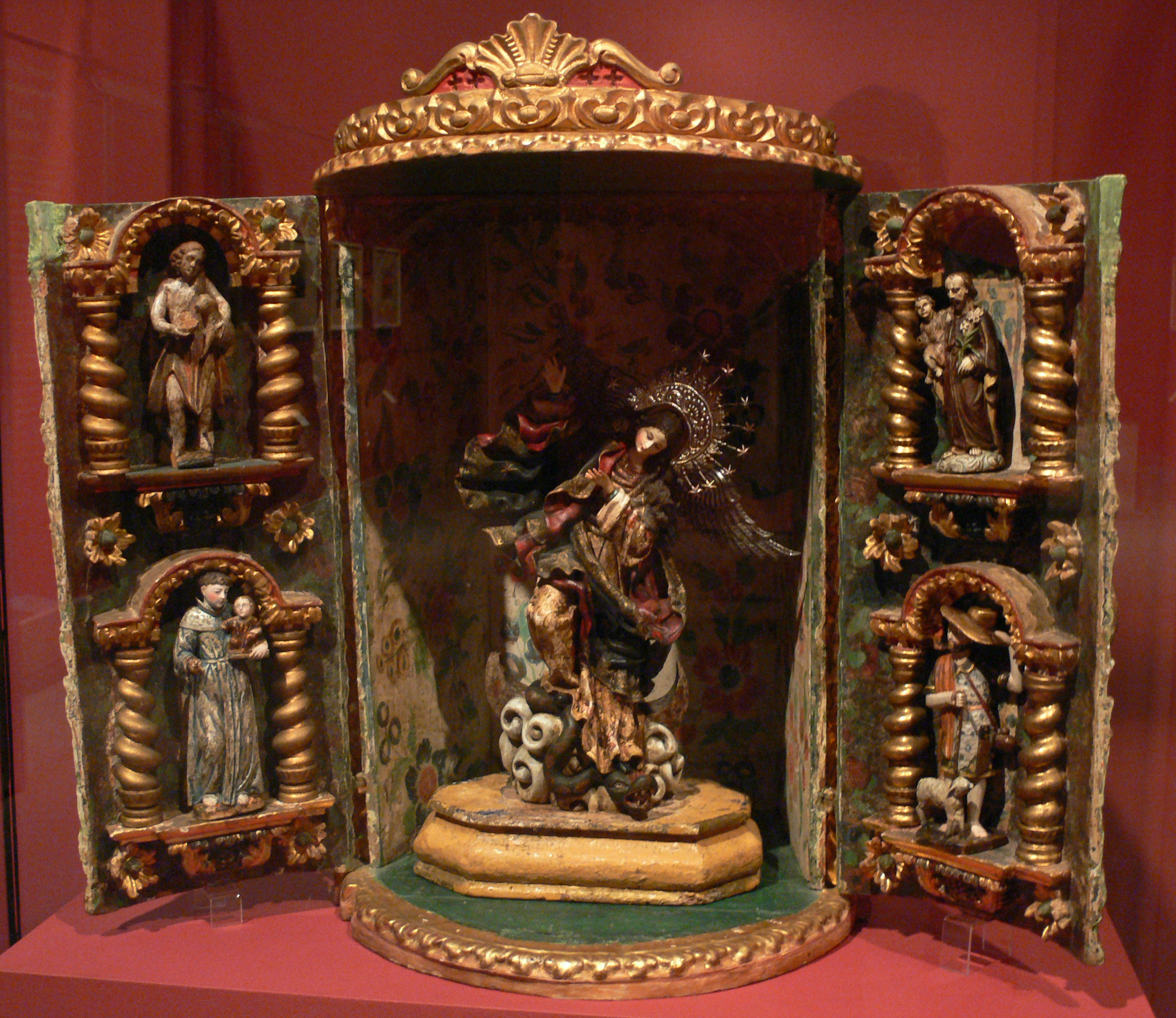
A colonial replica of the Virgin of Quito displayed in the Ethnological Museum of Berlin.

Legarda had established his reputation when in 1732 he was hired by the Franciscan fathers for the commission of an image of the “Virgin of the Immaculate Conception” for one of the altarpieces in a side chapel of the Church of San Francisco. Legarda could hardly create his own iconography for such a traditional image as the Immaculate Conception — it would not include the Christ child and the colors would have to be white and blue. The completed work was given to the Franciscans on 7 December 1734, which date is visible in the stubs of the hands of the Virgin along with the artist’s signature. Owing to the impressive beauty and impact of the work, the Franciscans promptly reassigned it to the main altar. The unique positioning of the hands and the flouncing folds of the dress — both of which gave an impression of movement — soon yielded the nickname “Dancing Virgin”. The unaccountable wings resulted in the sobriquet of "Winged Virgin".

In addition to the larger Popayán copy produced by Lagarda himself, countless small devotional images throughout Latin America replicate the famed original sculpture in the Church of San Francisco in Quito. One, produced by the famed artist Caspicara, is in the Brooklyn Museum. The largest copy is the Virgin of El Panecillo, a 45-meter tall statue by the Spanish artist Agustín de la Herrán Matorras on the hill known as El Panecillo in Quito. Made of aluminum, it has overlooked the city since 1976.

== See also ==
- Basilica and Convent of San Francisco, Quito
- List of buildings in Quito
