= El Panecillo =

Mountain in Quito Canton, Ecuador

Coordinates: 0°13′43″S 78°31′7″W

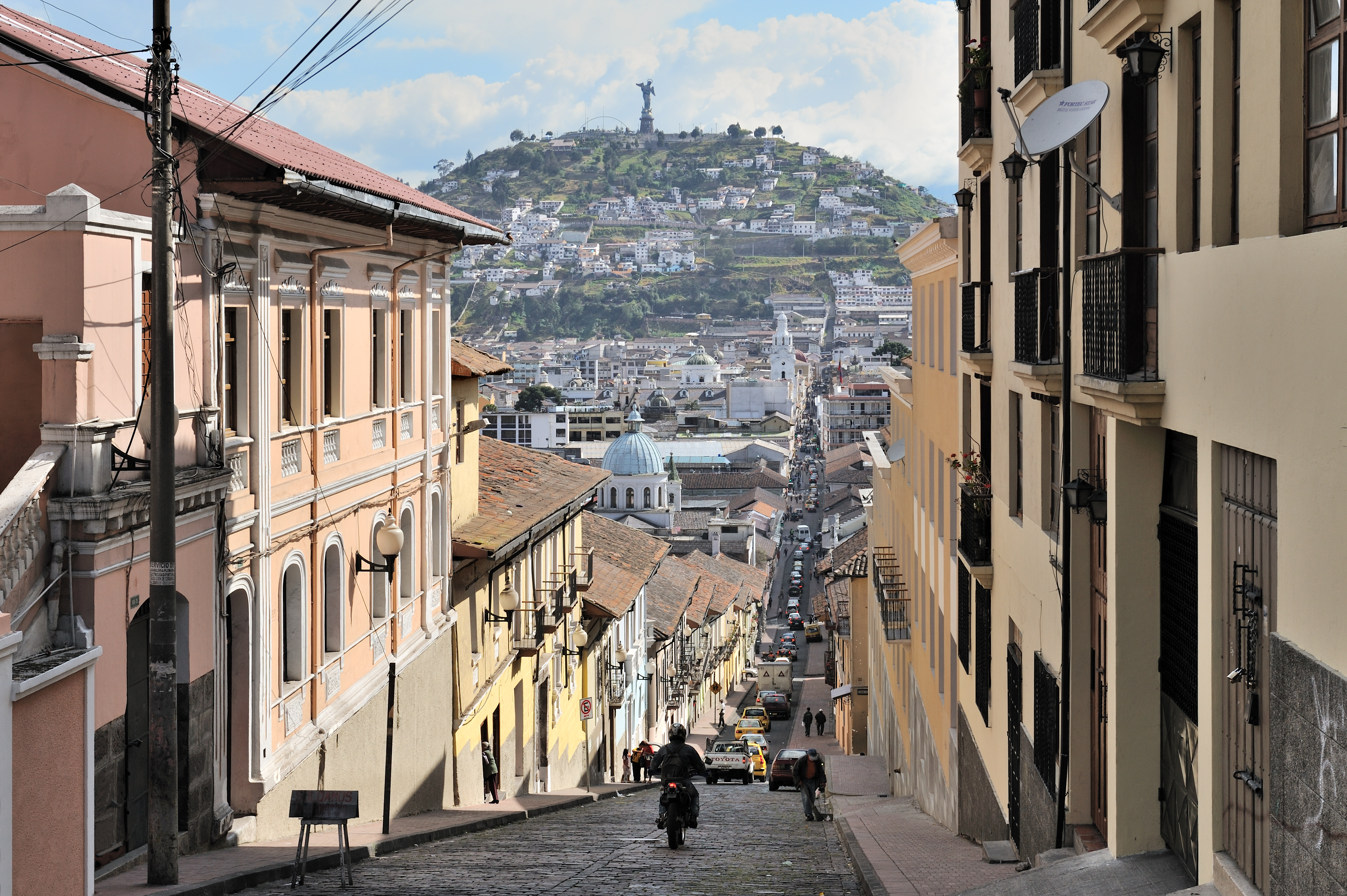
The El Panecillo hill seen from Quito's historic centre along the García Moreno street

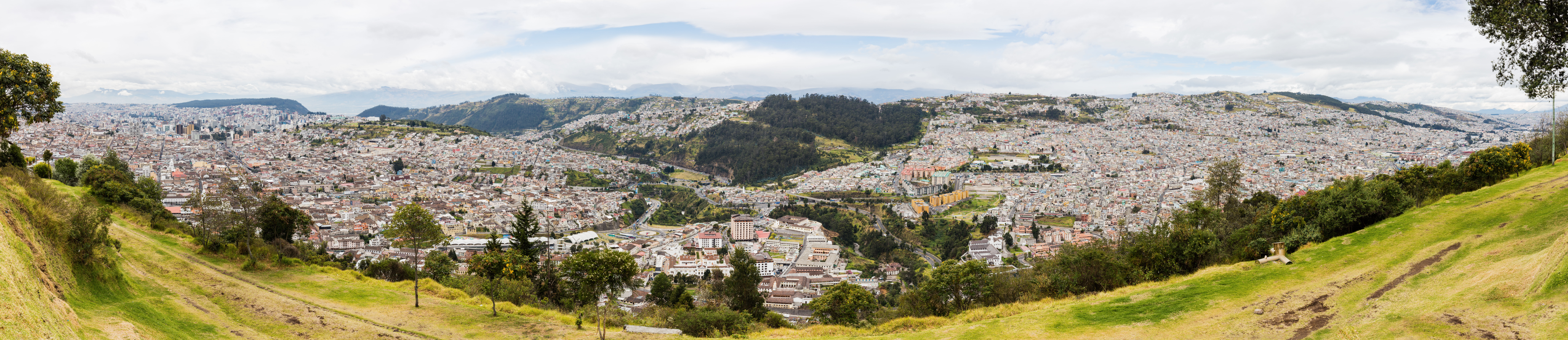
View of Quito from El Panecillo.

El Panecillo (from Spanish panecillo small piece of bread, diminutive of pan bread) is a 200-metre-high hill of volcanic-origin, with loess soil, located between southern and central Quito. Its peak is at an elevation of 3,016 metres (9,895 ft) above sea level. The original name used by the aboriginal inhabitants of Quito was Yavirac. According to Juan de Velasco, a Jesuit historian, there was a temple on top of Yavirac where the Indians worshiped the sun until it was destroyed by the Spanish conquistadores. The street that leads up to El Panecillo is named after Melchor Aymerich.

== Statue ==
Virgen de Quito

In 1975, the Spanish artist Agustín de la Herrán Matorras was commissioned by the religious order of the Oblates to build a 45-meter-tall stone monument of a madonna which was assembled on a high pedestal on the top of Panecillo. Called "Virgin of El Panecillo", it is made of seven thousand pieces of aluminium. The monument was inaugurated on March 28, 1975, by the 11th archbishop of Quito, Pablo Muñoz Vega. The statue was engineered and erected by Anibal Lopez of Quito.

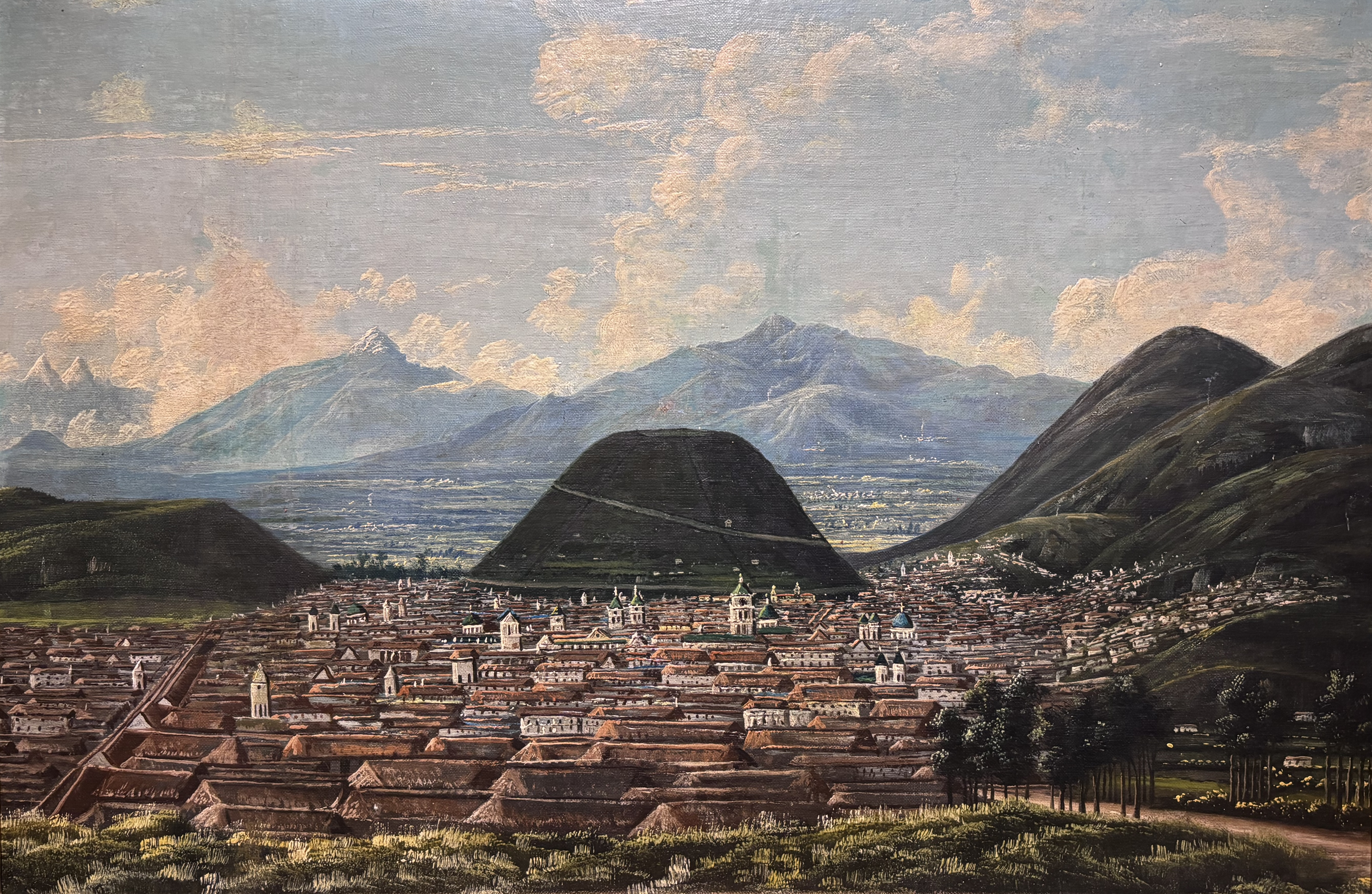
El Panecillo in the 19th century. Quito (c. 1889), attributed to Rafael Salas. National Museum of Ecuador.

The virgin stands on top of a globe and is stepping on a snake, which is a classic madonna iconography. Less traditional are the wings. Locals claim that she is the only one in the world with wings like an angel. The monument was inspired by the famous "Virgen de Quito" (Quito's Madonna) also known as "the dancer" sculpted by Bernardo de Legarda in 1734, which now decorates the main altar at the Church of St. Francis. This madonna represents a turning point of the Quito School of Art (one of the most renowned of the Americas) because it shows a virgin in movement that is practically dancing in contrast with the traditional static Madonnas that were produced during the 18th century.

According to a bronze placard affixed to the monument, the woman represented by the statue is the Woman of the Apocalypse, as described in the Book of Revelation (12:1–17).

== See also ==
- Virgin of Quito
- Basilica and Convent of San Francisco, Quito
