= Manuel Chili "Caspicara" =

Ecuadorian sculptor

Manuel Chili (Caspicara)
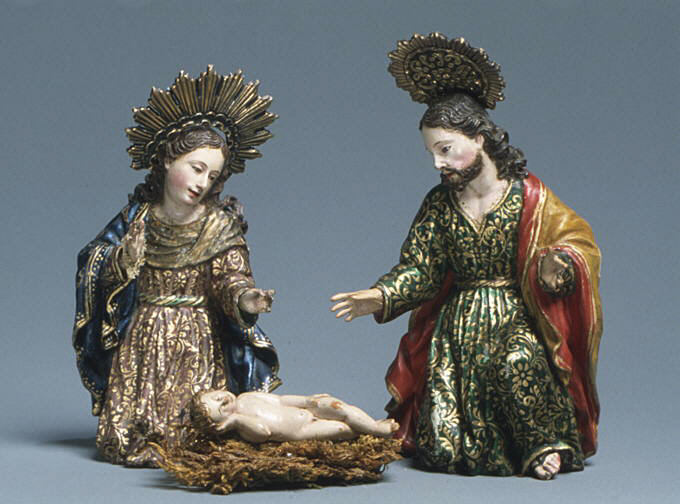
- Born: ca. 1723; Real Audiencia of Quito
- Died: 1796; Real Audiencia of Quito
- Known for: Sculpture
- Movement: Quito School (Escuela Quiteña)

Manuel Chili (ca. 1723, Quito – 1796) – known as Caspicara ("wooden face") – was an Ecuadorian sculptor who exemplified the Quito School movement of the 18th century Andes. His major religious works, characterized by polychromed wood sculptures in an elegant Spanish Baroque style, are preserved in the Quito Cathedral and the Church of San Francisco de Quito, Ecuador, and in Popayán, Colombia. His work was rediscovered in 1791 and championed by Eugenio Espejo, then the country's leading intellectual.

== Biography ==
Caspicara was born into an Indigenous family in Quito in about 1723. Among his predecessors was Lucas Barrionuevo (d. 1594) and among his mentors was Bernardo de Legarda (ca. 1700–1773), whom he is sometimes seen as succeeding. As a sculptor, he worked in both wood and marble, always within the prevailing Baroque style and with a religious motif. He grouped figures in a manner that evokes painting as much as sculpture. His technique of representation, especially of human anatomy, was impeccable.

== Works ==
Numerous works are attributed to Caspicara, among the most notable are listed here. Dating of individual works is very difficult.

- Las Virtudes Teologales ("Four Virtues"; in the choir of the Quito Cathedral)
- La Sábana Santa ("Holy Shroud", in the Quito Cathedral)
- Saint Francis (Church of San Francisco)
- The Twelve Apostles (Church of San Francisco)
- San Pedro de Alcántara (Church of San Francisco)
- Assumption of the Virgin (Church of San Francisco)
- El Cristo del Calvario de El Belén (Christ in Bethlehem)
- Del Cristo Yacente (Reclining Christ)
- Virgen de la Luz (in the National Museum of Ecuador)
- El Señor Atado a la Columna con San Pedro a los Pies ("The Lord Tied to the Column with Saint Peter at his Feet")
- Virgin de los Dolores
- La Impresión de las Llagas de San Francisco ("The Stigmatization of Saint Francis"; in the Cantuña Chapel, Church of San Francisco)
- Virgen del Carmen (in the Museo Franciscano)
- San José (in the Museo Franciscano)
- La Coronación de la Virgen María ("The Coronation of the Virgin Mary", in the Museo Franciscano)
- The group Del Tránsito de la Virgen (in a niche of San Antonio (Church of San Francisco));
- San José (in the Church of San Agustín de Latacunga)
- Several Franciscan saints and several figures representing Christ on the Cross and the Christ Child
