= Plaza de San Francisco, Quito =

Square in Quito, Ecuador

Coordinates: 00°13′14.6″S 78°30′53.6″W

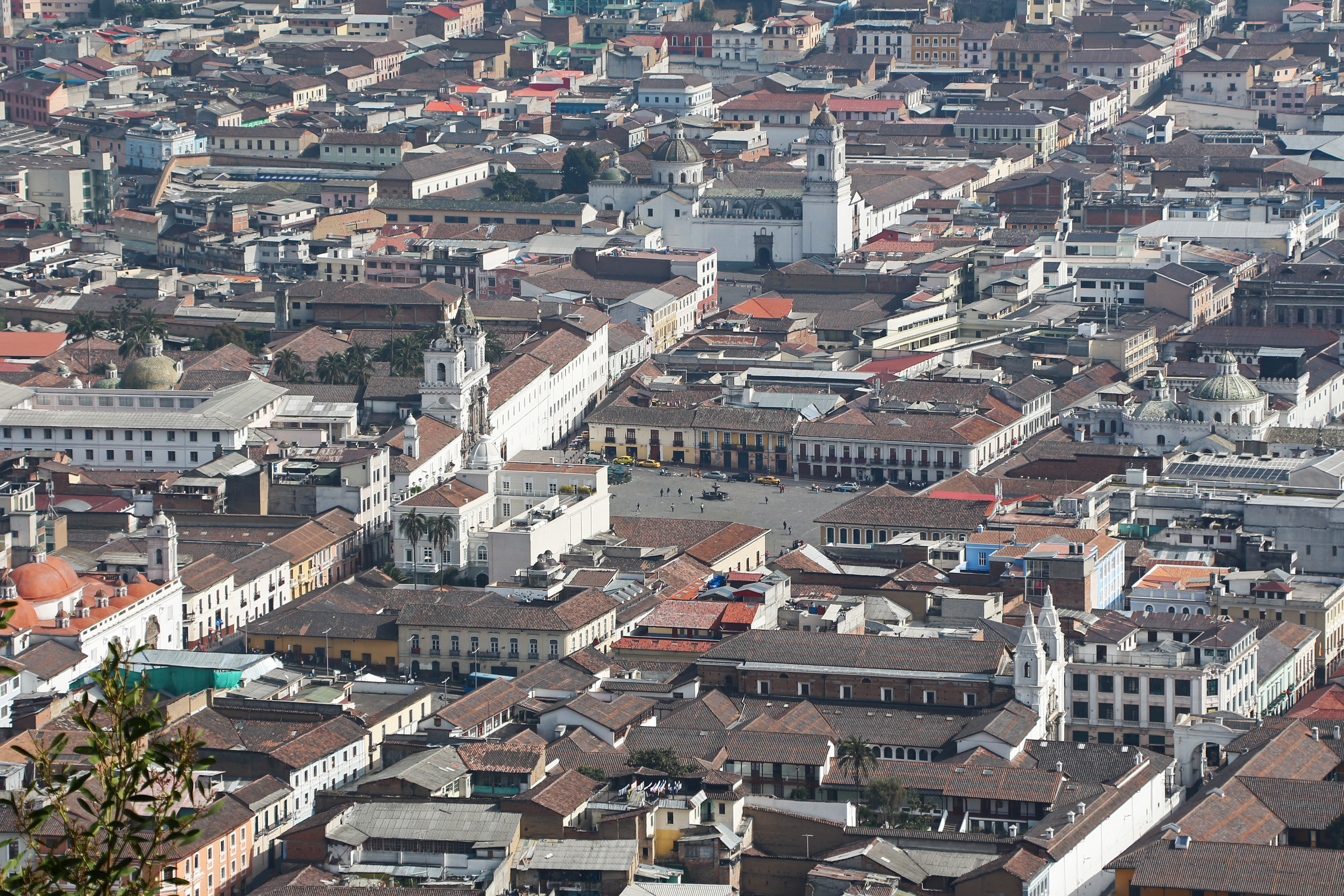
Plaza de San Francisco in Quito

The Plaza de San Francisco (“Saint Francis Square”) is a major public square in the Historic Center of Quito, Ecuador, upon which faces La Iglesia y Monasterio de San Francisco (the Church and Convent of St. Francis) from which it takes its name.

== History ==
The Plaza is built upon ancient Incan ruins, including Emperor Atahualpa’s (1497-1533) palace.

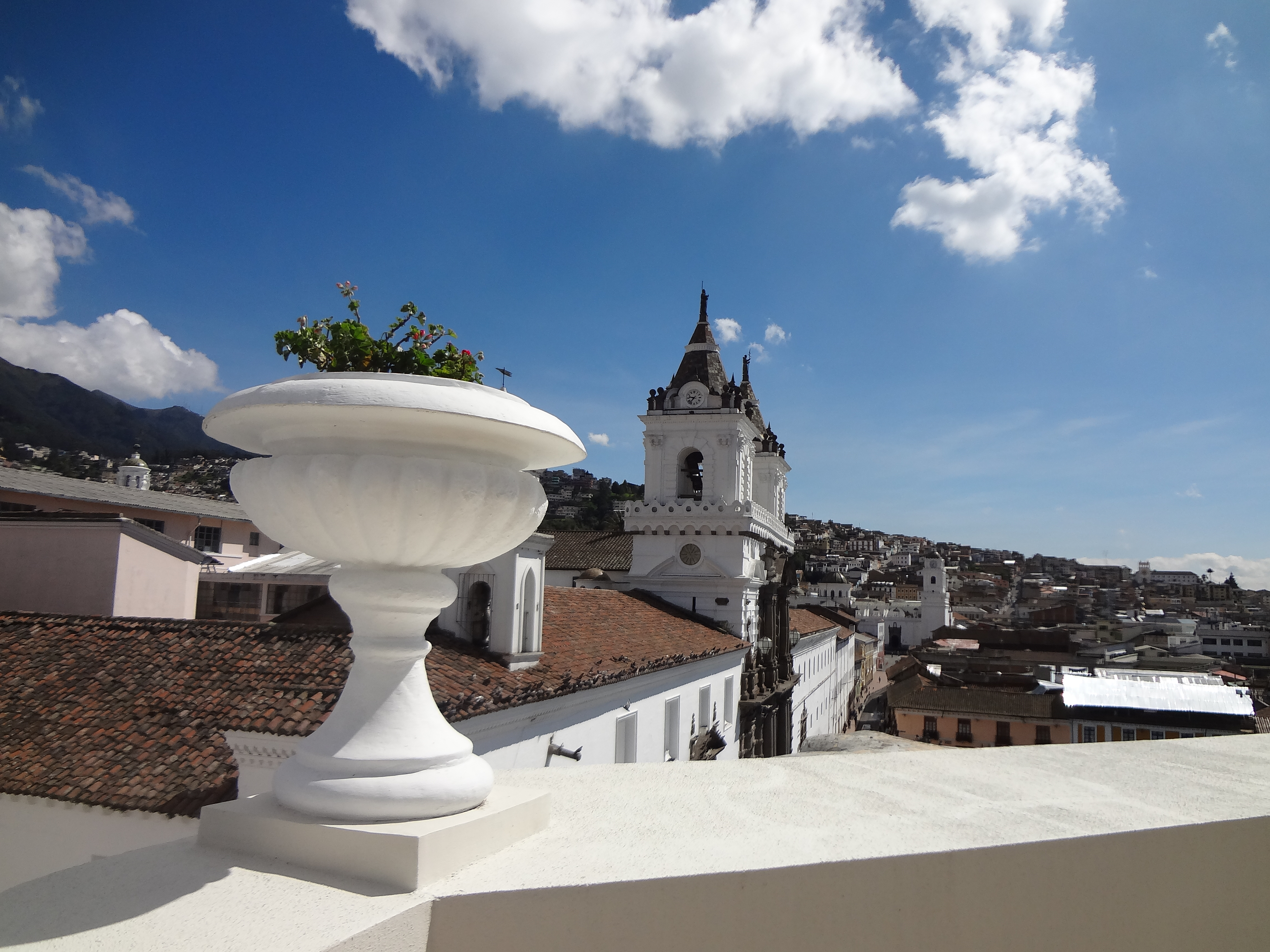
Plaza de San Francisco from the roof deck at Palacio Gangotena

=== Creation ===
{ su construcción inició en 1537, finalizó en 1680 y se inauguró en 1705.}

== Buildings ==
Building fronting on the Plaza de San Francisco include (in counterclockwise direction), the main façade of the Church and Convent of St. Francis, the Chapel of Villacís, the Chapel of Cantuña, and (on the corner of the square) the Palace Gangotena (Casa Gangotena).
