= Basilica and Convent of San Francisco, Quito =

Catholic church in Quito, Ecuador

Basilica and Convent of San Francisco
- Iglesia y Convento de San Francisco
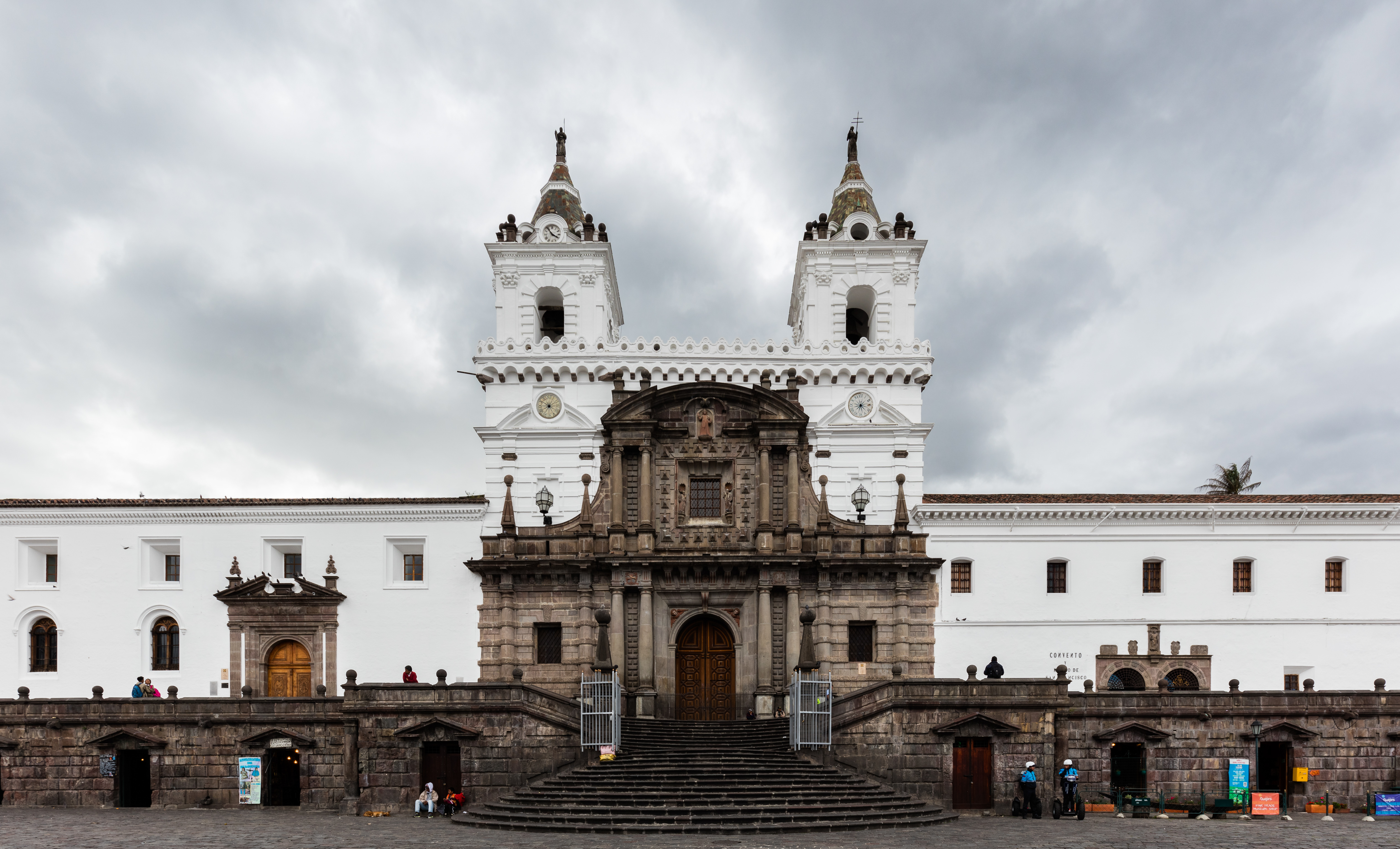
- Church and Plaza de San Francisco

Religion
- Affiliation: Roman Catholic
- Province: Archdiocese of Quito
- Rite: Roman Rite

Location
- Location: Quito, Ecuador
- Interactive map of Basilica and Convent of San Francisco
- Coordinates: 0°13′13″S 78°30′56″W

Architecture
- Type: Basilica and convent
- Style: Baroque
- Groundbreaking: 1535
- Completed: 1650
- Direction of façade: Southeast
- UNESCO World Heritage Site
- Type: Cultural
- Criteria: ii, iv
- Designated: 1978
- Parent listing: City of Quito
- Reference no.: 2

The Basilica and Convent of San Francisco (Spanish: Iglesia y Convento de San Francisco), commonly known as el San Francisco, is a Catholic basilica that stands in the middle of the historic center of Quito, in front of the square of the same name. It is the oldest and most significant religious site in Ecuador. The structure is the largest architectural complex within the historic centers of all of South America, and for this reason it was known as "El Escorial of the New World". San Francisco is considered a jewel of continental architecture for its mixture of different styles combined throughout more than 150 years of construction. San Francisco is part of the UNESCO World Heritage Site "City of Quito".

On its three and a half hectares of surface, thirteen cloisters have been built (six of them of great magnitude), three temples, a large Atrium, adding approximately 40,000 square meters of construction. Multiple activities are currently carried out there: conventual and religious, public care in the areas of health, communication, education and others of a popular nature that keep the building active.

Inside the church there are more than 3,500 works of colonial art, of multiple artistic manifestations and varied techniques, especially those corresponding to the Colonial Quito School of Art, which was born precisely in this place. It also has a Franciscan library, described in the 17th century as the best in the Viceroyalty of Peru.

The complex is preceded by the Plaza de San Francisco that for years supplied the city with water from its central fountain, and which has functioned as a popular market, as a space for military and political concentrations, and as a meeting place and social recreation. The concave-convex staircase that connects the square with the Atrium, which highlights the Mannerist-Baroque facade of the main building, is considered of great architectural importance in the Colonial Americas.

== History ==
In pre-Columbian Quito, the current lands of the Basilica and Convent of San Francisco were occupied by the royal palace of the Inca Huayna Cápac, before the advance of the armies commanded by the Spanish from the south and the impossibility of defending the city the indigenous general Rumiñahui ordered its total destruction. In the city fire the palace was destroyed and buried under a huge amount of rubble and garbage. One of Rumiñahui's soldiers was the great-grandfather of the indigenous Cantuña, who, as an eyewitness to the events, had full knowledge of what was buried there. The construction of the basilica and convent of San Francisco began around the year 1537, just three years after the Spanish foundation of the city, with the completion of a temporary church that remained until 1550, when the construction of the current building began and which was completed around 1680. Although the building was officially inaugurated in 1705.

=== The plots ===
With the support of the European Franciscan Congregation, the Ghent's clerics Jodoco Ricke and Pedro Gosseal, who were cousins of Charles V, Holy Roman Emperor, they arrived in the city two years after its foundation, managed to acquire some plots on the southwest side of the Plaza Mayor de Quito, in the same place where one day the military seats of the heads of the imperial troops were: Chalcuchímac and Quizquiz. That is to say, the place had enormous historical and strategic significance for the indigenous people that the Franciscans wanted to evangelize. The thesis of the place as the center of the Inca and Caranqui cultures was reinforced after the archaeological studies carried out in the basilica on the occasion of its renovation, between 1983 and 1990, in which important ceramic pieces were found, belonging to those pre-Columbian cultures (and also panzaleas) under the nave, the cloisters, the orchard, the atrium and the square.

The Cabildo of the recently created city of San Francisco de Quito, by virtue of the physical ordering of the city, initially assigned to the Franciscans an area of land that was equivalent to two blocks, each 220 feet in length. However, in 1538, after successive adjudications by the same Cabildo, an area of more than three hectares was reached. In 1533, its limits, both to the north and to the south, coincided with those of the Plaza de San Francisco, so that the lot was facing the Plaza, without exceeding any of its sides (to the west it should reach up to the coristado).

When, in 1537, Friar Jodoco Ricke asked the Cabildo to hand over, on the one hand, some land for the Yanakuna Indigenous who served the Basilica and, on the other hand, one more piece of land for it, which is deduced from the coristado to the current calle Imbabura. In 1538 the plot was extended to the north; that is to say, from the Main Cloister to the current dependencies of the Police; On this occasion, Friar Pedro Gosseal asked the "sirs of the Cabildo to grant him a piece of land for a garden to put it in the house of San Francisco because it makes a turn of the land and because it goes straight". A street from east to west, which kept the rhythm of the checkerboard grid and extension of the current calle Sucre, divided the Convent from the garden; this street must have been closed definitively in the middle of the 17th century, due to the construction of the two cloisters adjoining the main cloister.

=== Construction ===
"With all that I have invested in its church, and in the towers that stand out in the city, I should see them from here (from Madrid)"

— it was the first expression of Charles V, Holy Roman Emperor, King of Spain, to speak of the monastic and clerical complex of San Francisco that was financing in the new city of Quito, in the lands of the New World. Immediately afterwards, in a very proud tone, he declared that famous phrase that the sun never set in his empires.

==== First phase ====
This stage covers a period of fifteen years: between 1535, with the construction of the church and provisional residence of the religious; between 1551 and 1575 the church, the facade and the atrium were raised; and the mid-1650s, with the construction of almost a dozen cloisters adjacent to the main one. This is considered the most important construction period of the complex.

It is unknown who drew the original plans for the complex, the most accepted hypothesis is that they were sent from Spain, based on the topographical study of Ricke and Gosseal. It can also be perfectly assumed that architects came from Spain for the construction of the Franciscan monastery, architects who, knowing practically the land, knew how to take advantage of its inclination, for the design and execution of that admirable step and beautiful parapet, on which, the artistic and severe façade of the church is displayed. Although there are also those who support the theory that it was Ricke and Gosseal who did all the work from start to finish.

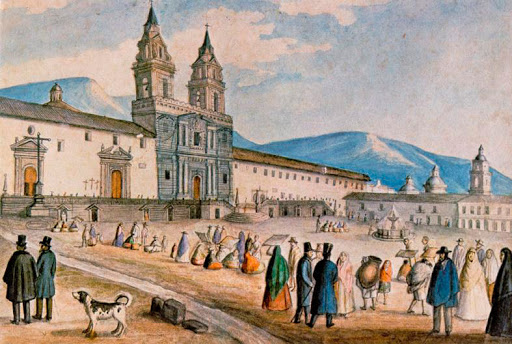
Basilica of San Francisco in 1840 by Juan Agustín Guerrero, before the 1868 earthquake that would bring its top of spires down.

However, the name of Friar Antonio Rodríguez, a native of Quito, and a great architect who flourished in the mid-17th century, as the author of a large part of the basilica and another jewel of Quito's colonial architecture, is preserved: the Church of Santa Clara. Among the papers in the convent's Archive, there is also a handwritten memoir from 1632 that speaks of Germán de Alemán, Jorge de la Cruz and his son Francisco, who worked on the construction of the basilica during the first period, that is, that of Friar Jodoco Ricke; for whose services he gave them, in agreement with the cabildo, some land from the quarries up towards Pichincha. In said Memory some of the works that those workers worked are specified: "(...) for payment of the making of this church and main chapel and choir of San Francisco, because the convent does not have what to pay them, they are given legal possession of the plots above the quarries and towards the Pichincha mountain(...)".

==== Second phase ====
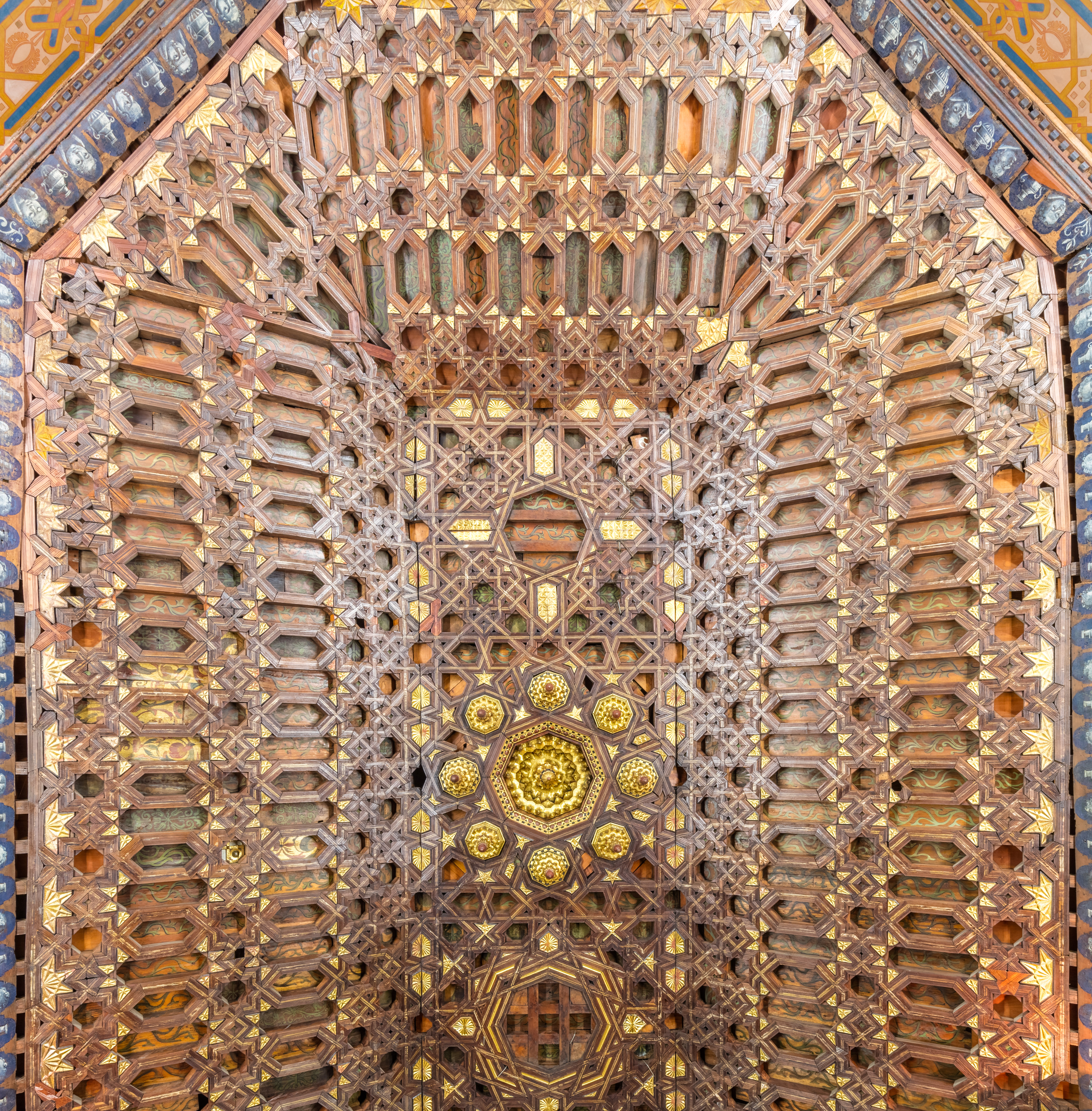
The preserved 16th-century Mudéjar artesonado in the crossing and in the choir nave.

It corresponds to the internal ornamentation and minor architectural complementation, and covers the period between 1651 and 1755. During these years the rise and consolidation of the Order was reflected in the increase in the artistic assets of the Maximum Convent (this church). Its splendor, however, was seriously affected as a result of the 1755 earthquake which, among other things, destroyed partially the Mudéjar artesonado ceiling in the main nave of the church. The 16th-century Mudéjar artesonado is preserved in the crossing and in the choir nave.

=== Restorations and adaptations ===
Both the temple and the chapels and the various cloisters of the Convent underwent various changes from the mid-18th century, especially due to the various earthquakes it had to face. These stages could be considered within the construction process.

==== Third phase ====
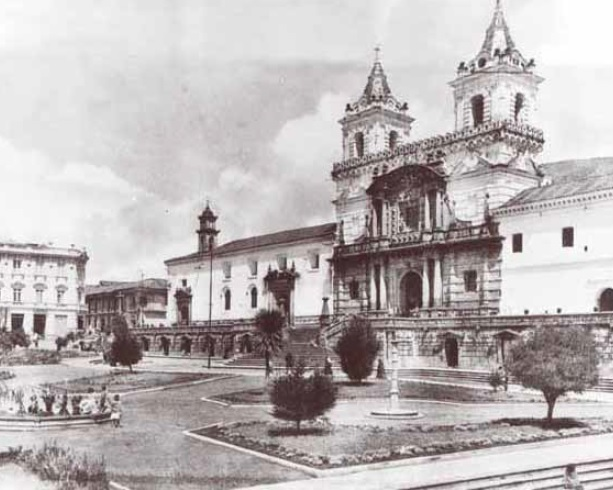
Basilica of San Francisco in 1920.

This corresponds to a period of architectural reconstruction that occurred between the years 1756 and 1809. Despite the secularization of the doctrines, which caused a considerable decrease in the funds of the Province of Quito, the Franciscans dedicated an enormous effort to the reconstruction of the conventual dependencies. With regard to this, there was an aesthetic redefinition of the interior of the church, by placing a Baroque coffered ceiling in the main nave that did not attempt against the aesthetic harmony of the entire complex.

==== Fourth phase ====
This stage corresponds to the institutional crisis of the Franciscan Order and the consequent extirpation of spaces suffered by the Basilica between 1810 and 1894. A deep crisis of values went through the Order during these years; the Franciscans were forced to cede large areas of the Maximum Convent, which caused their functional destructuring. However, in the areas that remained under their control, traditional forms of organization persist.

==== Modern phase ====
From 1895 to 1960, a new use of spaces was produced and modernity arrived at the complex. Despite the fact that San Francisco has preserved its physical structure unalterably, at this stage there were changes linked to the application and use of new construction techniques and materials at the time of the interventions. Due to the modernization of the city's urban infrastructure, the convent facilities benefited from electricity, drinking water, sewerage and telephone services.

On the other hand, with the installation of new dependencies (museum, printing office, theater, radio, private educational establishment) there was a functional readjustment of its spatial structure that, gradually, became more public.

== Architecture ==
If a specific analysis of its architectural environment is made, it will be noted that in San Francisco the classic typology of Medieval monasteries survived. In this, the spatial distribution started from the church, its guiding axis, and from there the cloister galleries opened where the cells, the refectory, the chapter house, the cellar and the parlour were normally distributed. The definitive form was the quadrangular courtyard, with its respective four galleries; contributing, the main ones, to denominate their respective gallery: gallery of the chapter house, gallery of the refectory, gallery of converts, gallery of the mandatum.

The church, in the case of San Francisco, is also the center of that order. Starting from it, the four cloister galleries are projected, all of the same size, in which at least two elements of the monasteries of the Middle Ages have been preserved: the refectory and the bedroom. However, no gallery has been assigned to the chapter house, which never existed in San Francisco. In reality, it is not possible to know exactly what other rooms were distributed around the four cloistered bays and where they were located, however, and according to Friar Fernando de Cozar, at a later time (1647) in the Cloister there was the Room of Profundis, the Refectory, the Library next to the art and theology classrooms, the Gatehouse and a small church with a sacristy. The adjoining gallery of the church, the mandatum, must have had benches for reading in accordance with the ancient norms of spatial organization.

But equally, the complex network of dependencies that was organized in its interior it recreated its own self-sufficient microcosm, similar to that of Medieval monasteries. As in these, in San Francisco, in addition to the basic dependencies we have those dedicated to health, education, trades, orchard and even a jail (to maintain the strict conventual discipline). The kitchen, the nursing and the apothecary functioned in the Services Cloister.

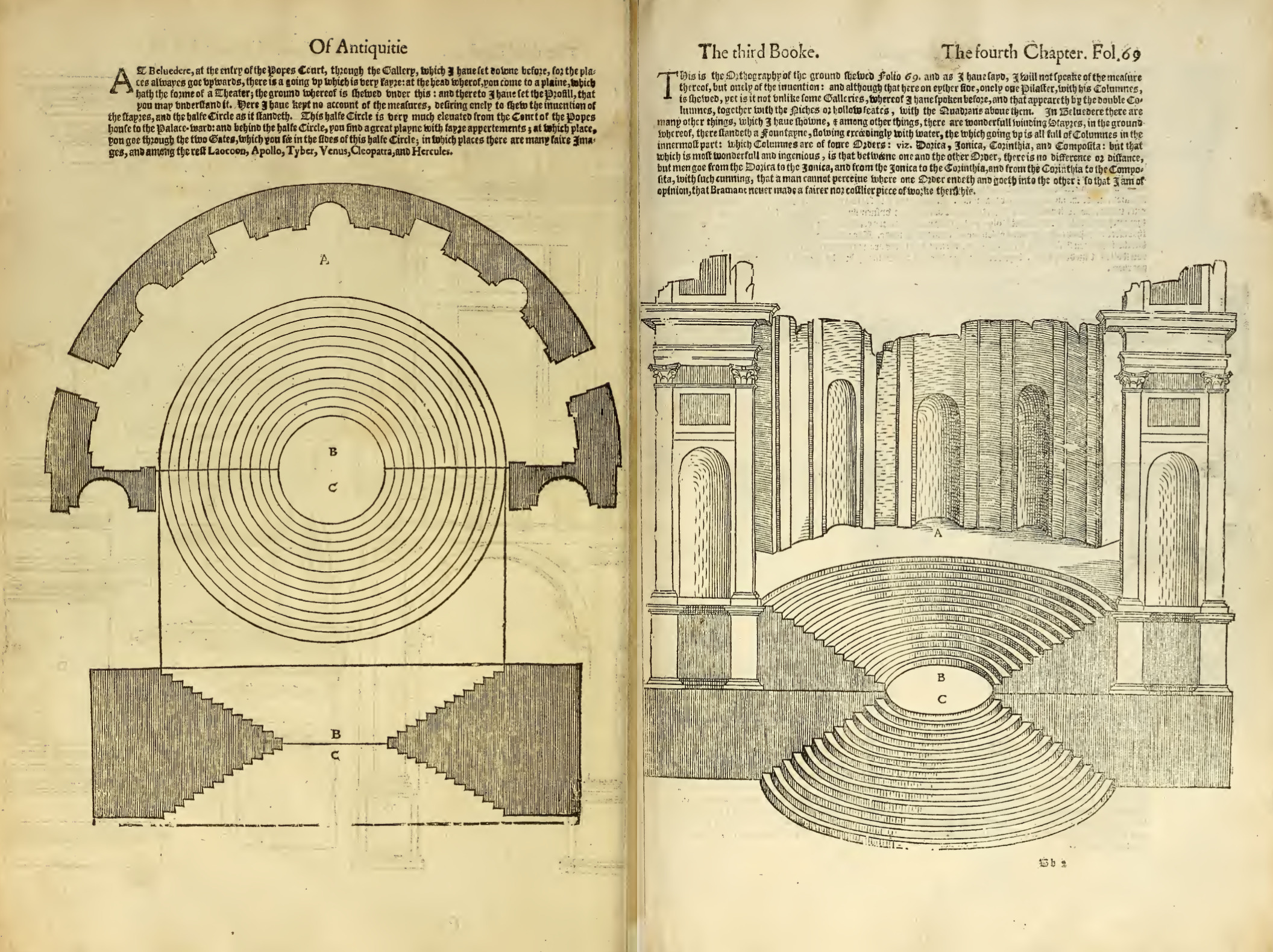
Bramante's convave-convex stair design for his Belvedere Court project. In a 1611 English translation of Sebastiano Serlio's treatise on architecture.

The architectural complex of San Francisco de Quito was necessarily linked to its urban environment. There are three spaces that defined relations with the outside world:

- The plaza, which was a purely urban space, perfectly demarcated, which connected religious and civilians through various activities (tianguez, doctrine, market, water supply).
- The Atrium, which was the one that, without ceasing to fulfill urban functions, had much more sacred characteristics than the plaza. This, at least during the 16th and 17th centuries, was the burial place for the common people. This space is preceded by a half concave and half convex staircase, inspired by a design by Bramante as found in Spanish translations of Sebastiano Serlio’s Tercero y cuarto libro de arquitectura. The entire atrium is made of andesite stone extracted from the quarry of the Pichincha volcano.
- The church and chapels, which were properly sacred places.
- The main cloister/courtyard was built between 1573 and 1581. It has two galleries: the lower one with canted arches in the Mudéjar style on Doric columns, and the upper one with segmental or basket-handle arches.
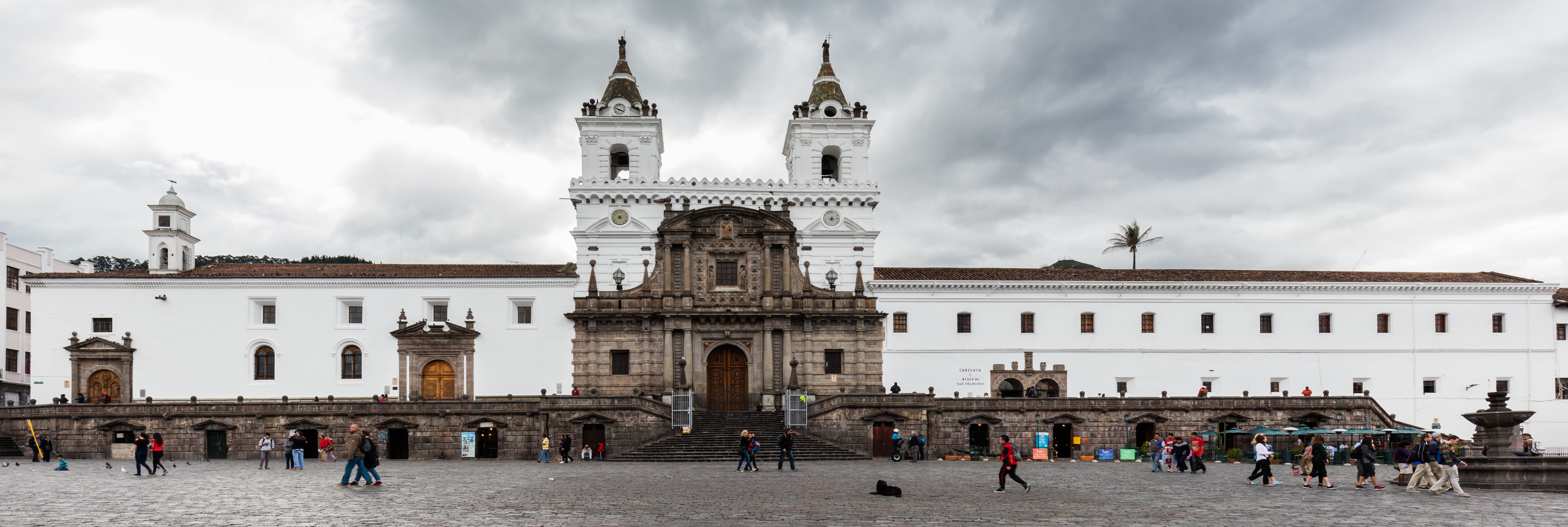
Complete facade of the Basilica of San Francisco
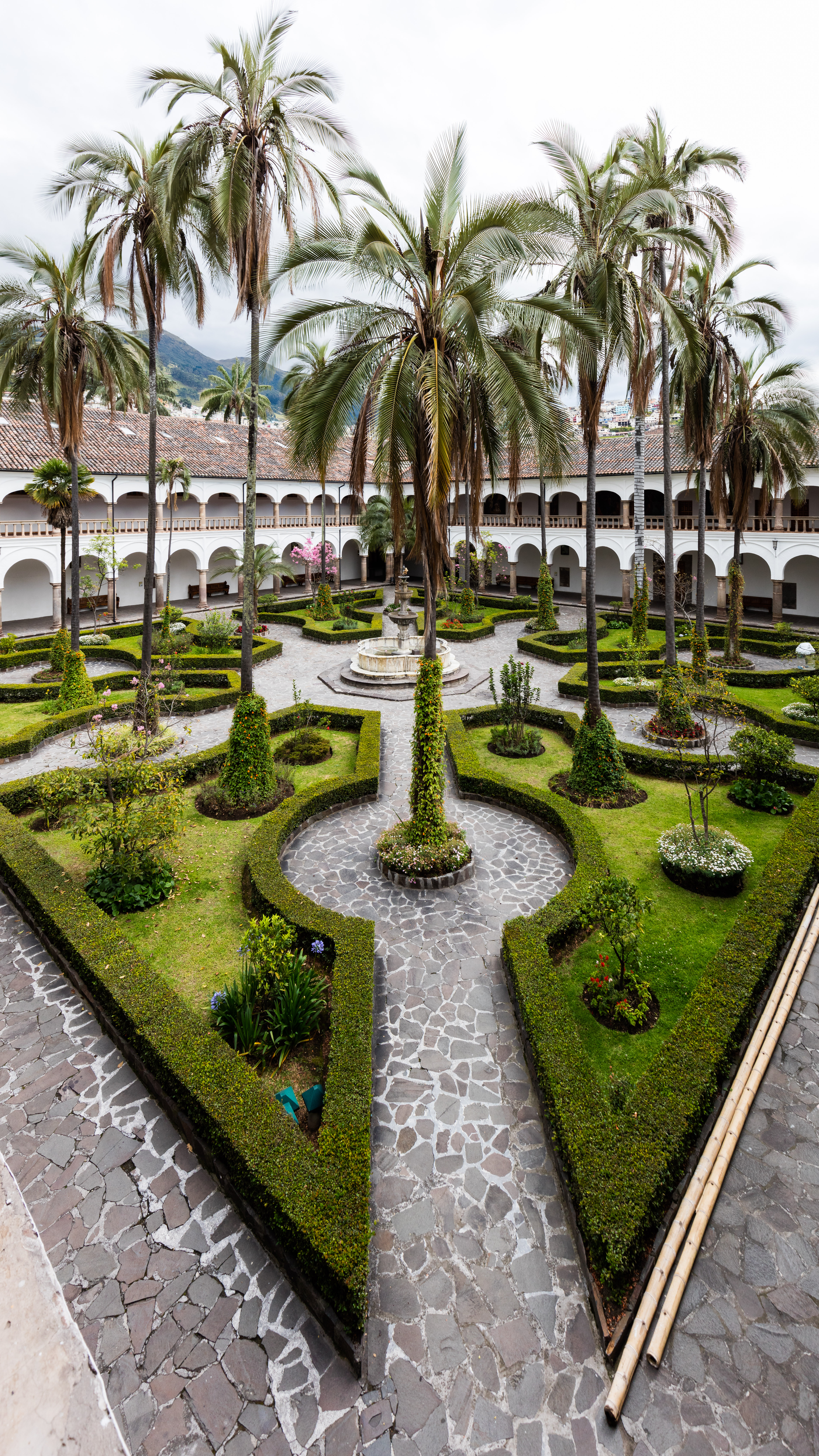
The main courtyard.

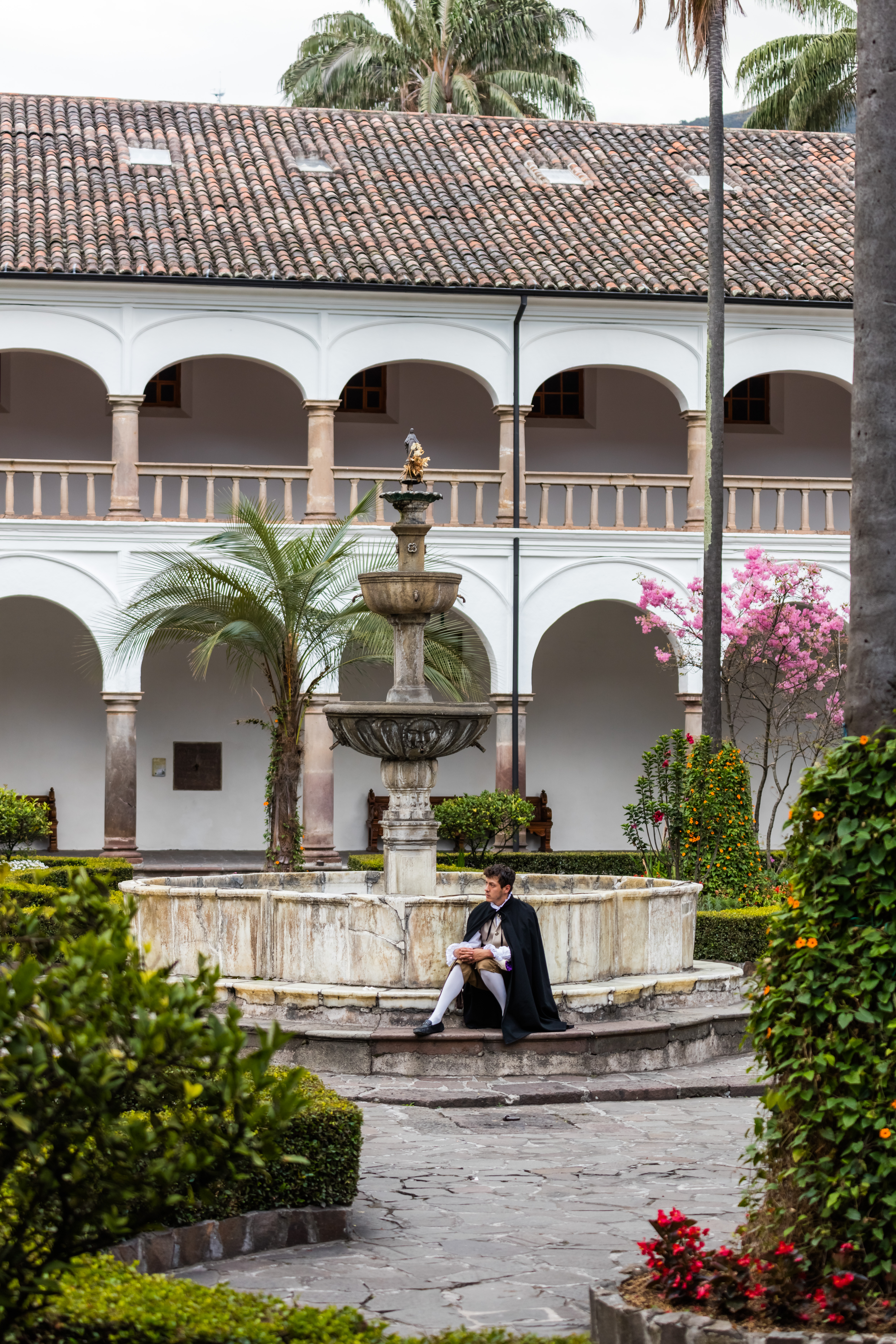
The colonial fountain

=== Style ===
The original plans of the basilica were subjected to various changes throughout the almost 150 years that its construction took. Many times these changes were "violent and misguided" due to earthquake damage and the evolution of art and culture to finally reach the almost Eclectic form we know it today; That is why San Francisco is one of the most important buildings in Colonial Hispanic American architecture.

The facade of the basilica reflects the early presence, and for the first time in South America, of Mannerist elements, which made it a point of reference for this style on the continent. The Renaissance severity and exterior Mannerism contrast with the internal decoration of the church, in which Mudéjar and Baroque styles are mixed with gold leaf to give an unusual splendour.

In its three naves, San Francisco unveils Mudéjar artesonado ceilings, lavishly decorated altarpieces and columns of various styles. In the choir, the Mudéjar decoration, original from the end of the 16th century, remains intact because the central nave collapsed in an earthquake and was replaced by a Baroque coffered ceiling in 1770. Mudéjar ceilings at the ends, Baroque in the central nave, altarpieces full of images, mascarons and cherubs looking at the center of the High Altar.

The complex is completed with the Convent, in which the architectural beauty of the main cloister stands out, arranged around the immense courtyard, in two superimposed galleries.

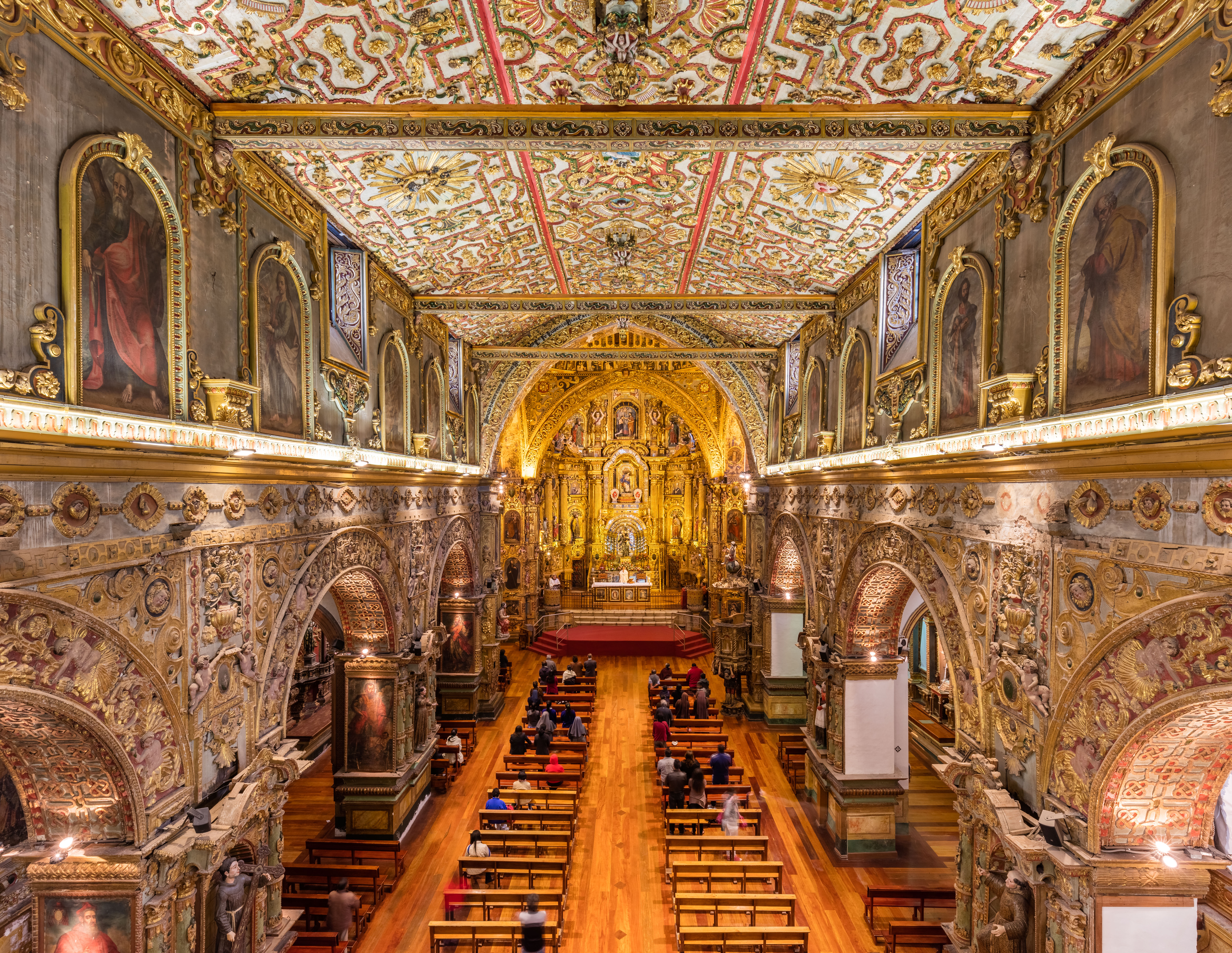
Interior

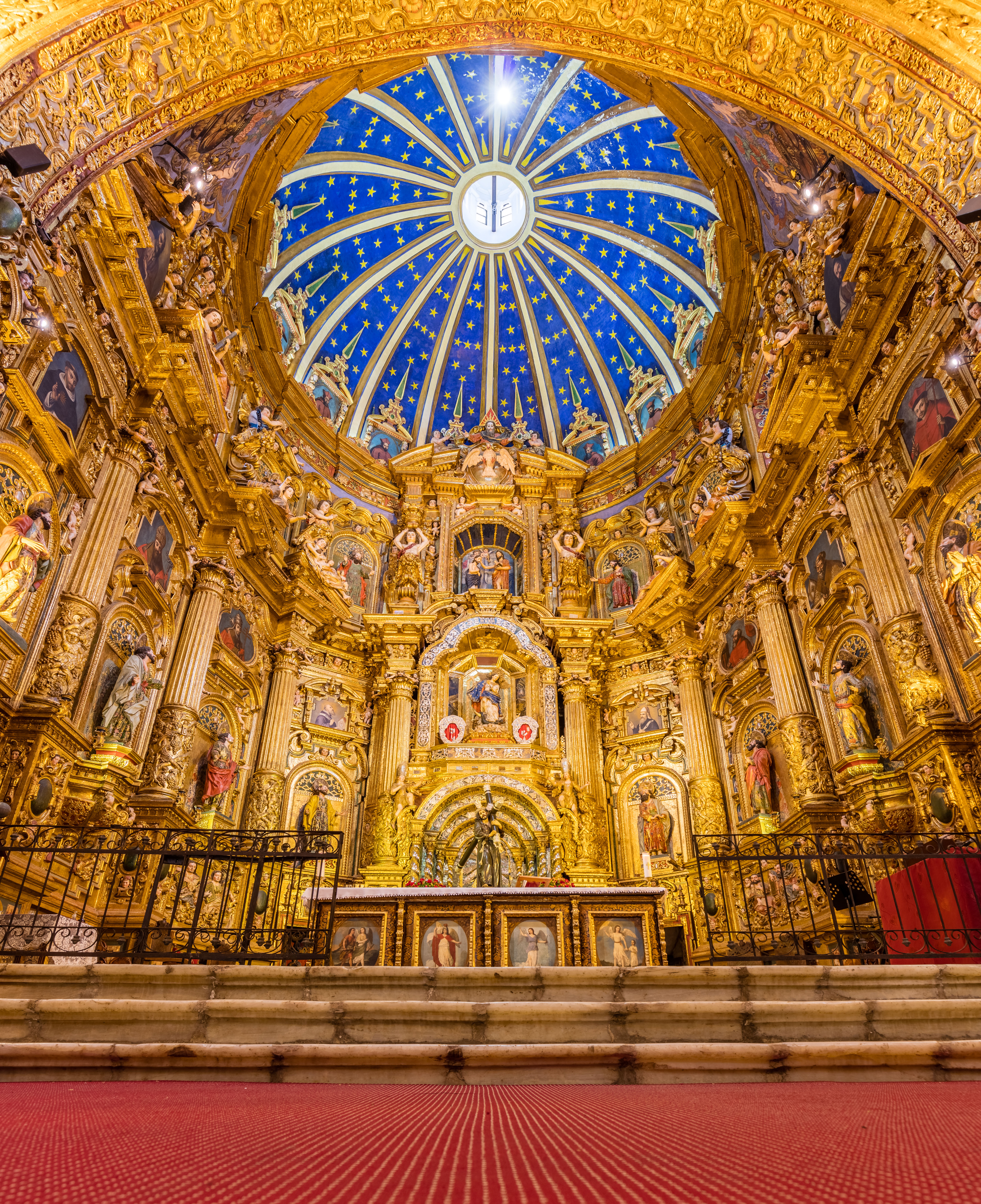
Main altarpiece of the church.

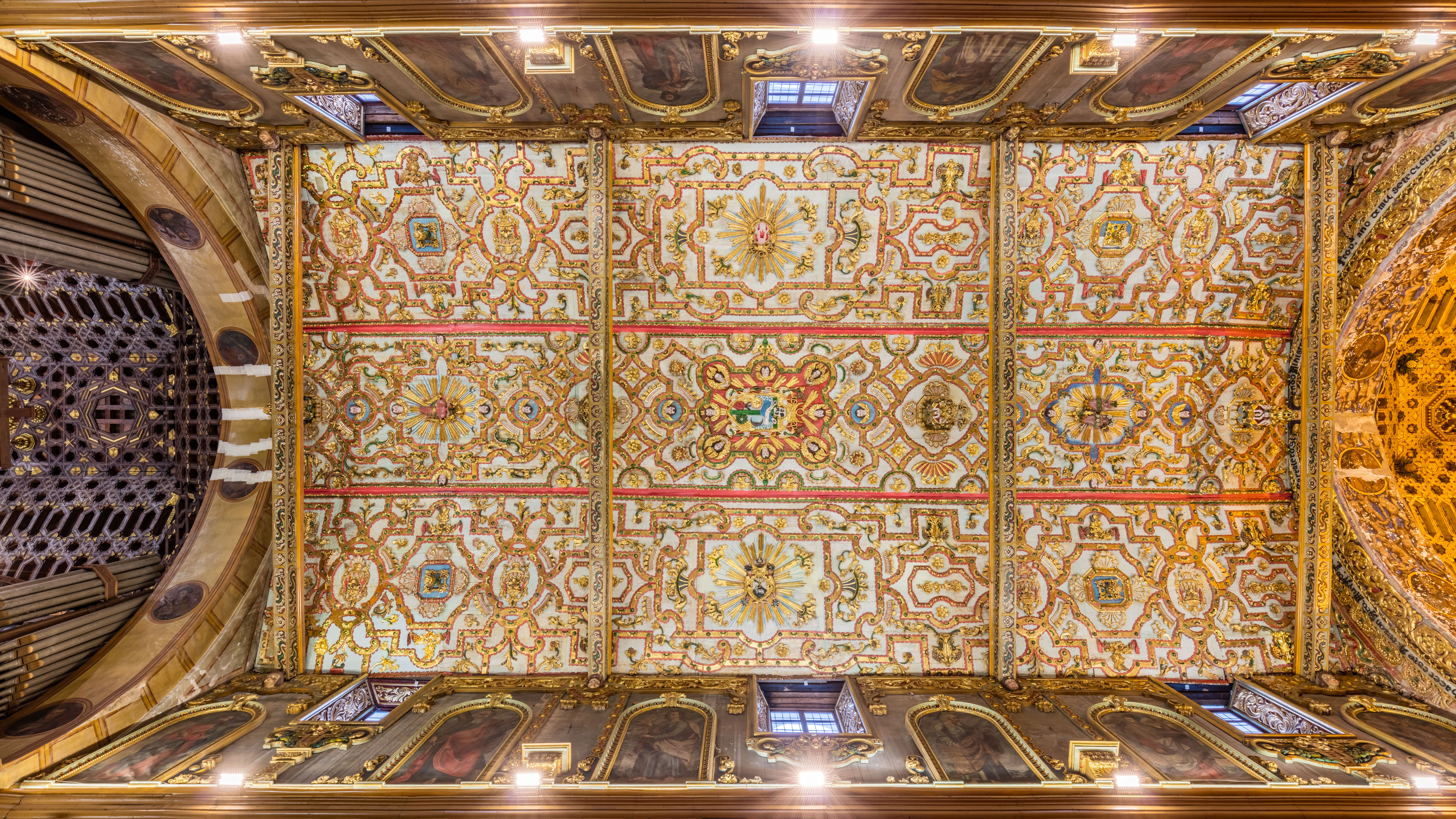
Detail of the ceiling.

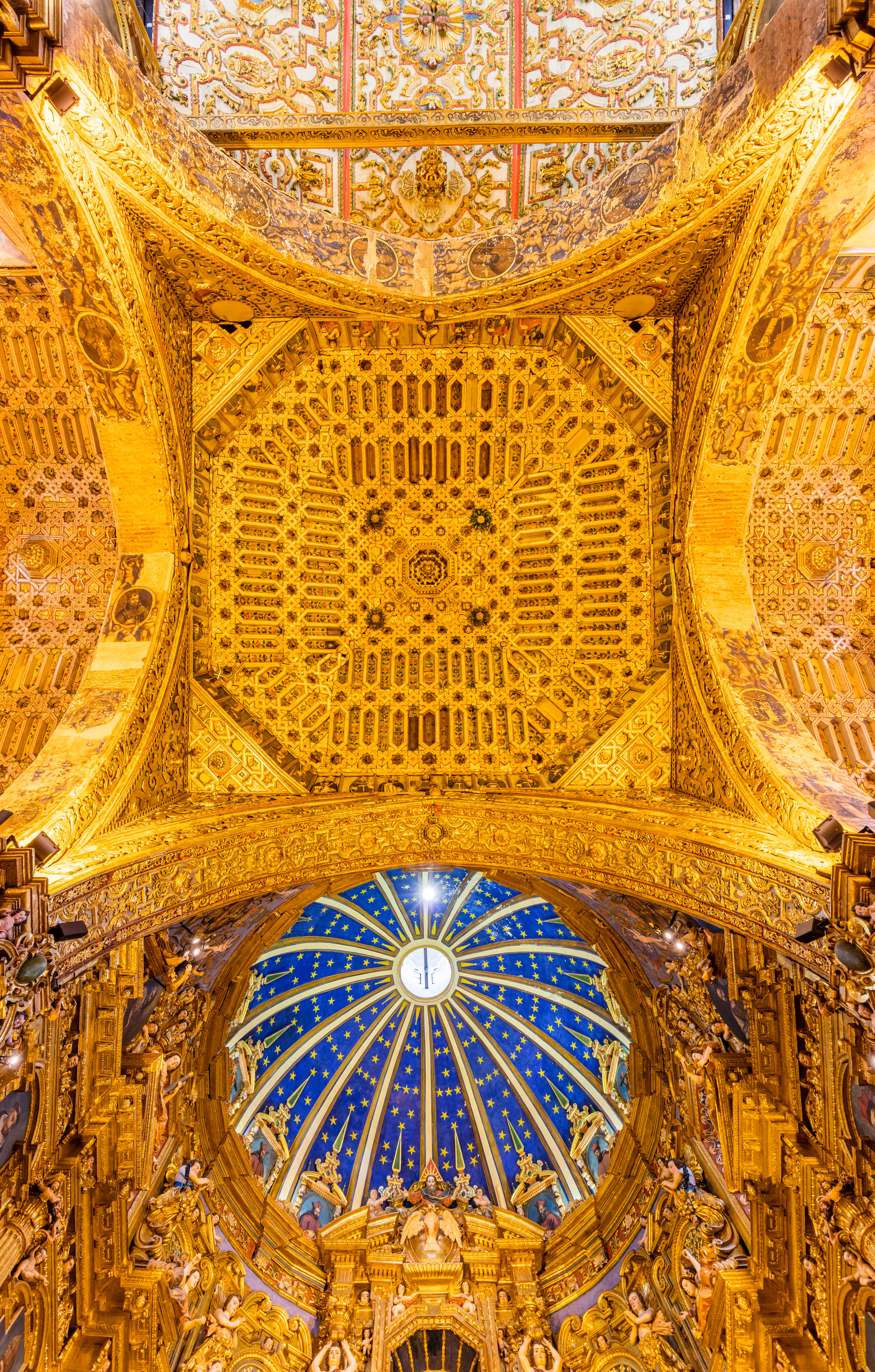
Inside view of the church domes.

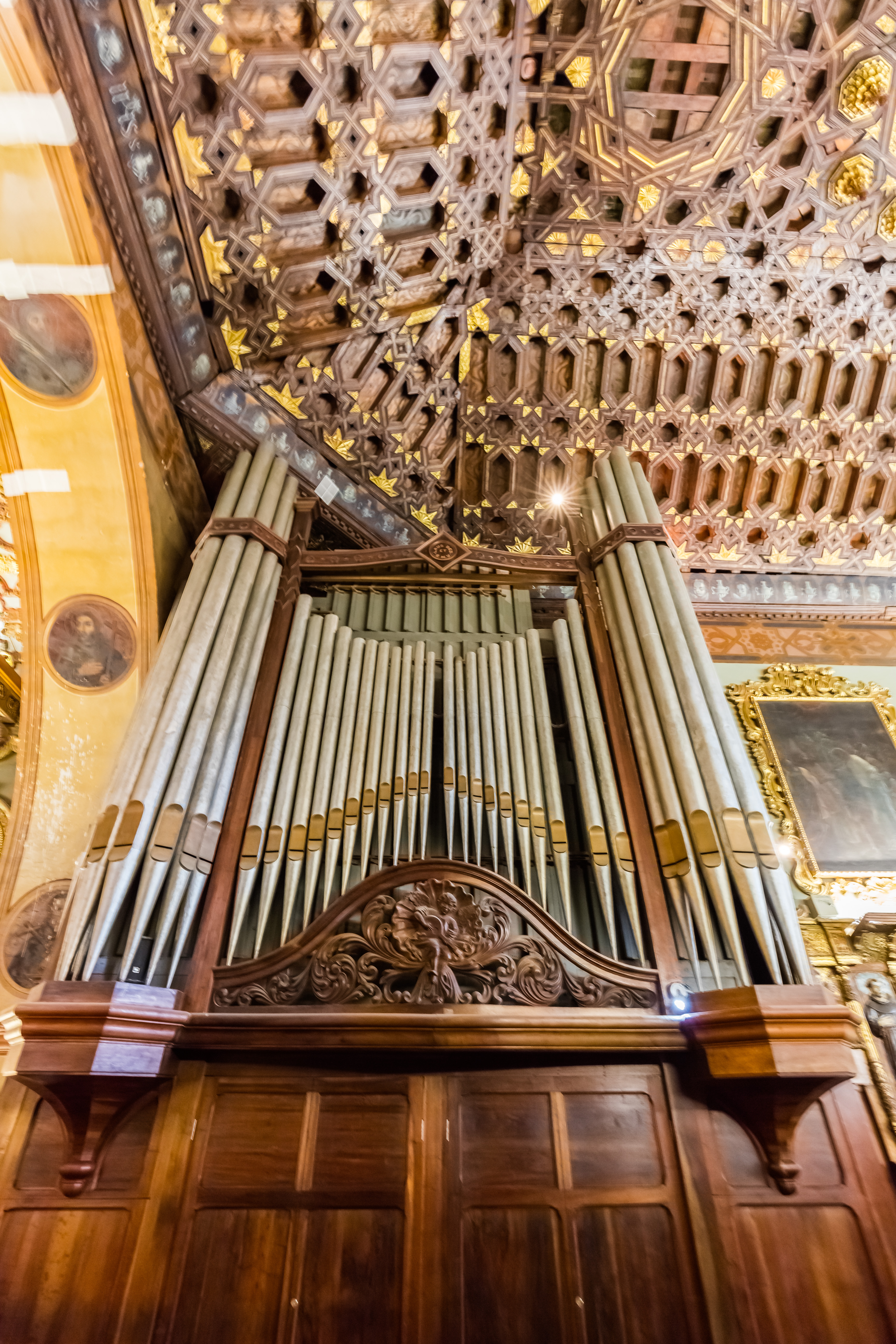
Rear view of the pipe organ.

=== Chapel of Villacís ===
The most outstanding case in the second half of the 17th century was that of Don Francisco de Villacís who, on 6 November 1659, founded a chaplaincy of ten thousand pesos, census taxes on his assets and especially on the Hacienda Guachalá, located in the Cayambe valley, becoming its patron saint. After his death, the chapel was to pass to his legitimate children, failing which, to the natural he had, and as there were no direct heirs, he appointed his brother Juan de Villacís as his successor. Being established that the costs of ornamentation of the chapel would be borne by its patron, these had been entrusted to Quitoan Friar Antonio Rodríguez.

In 1939 the friars had difficulties with some heirs of Francisco de Villacís, who claimed rights over the chapel. In a special way about the crypt that belonged to them and that the Convent had given, about six years ago, to Mr. Pacífico Chiriboga y Borja, believing that there were no heirs with the right to this space. The patrons of the chapel lost their rights by not accepting a contract, by which they were offered the old crypt behind the sacristy, where the religious were buried, in exchange for paying ten thousand sucres in cash. In this way, in the year 1947, within a general process of the Order, to value its artistic treasures, the community undertook the repair and arrangements of this space. On 26 October of this year, it was blessed, devoting it to the Sacred Heart.

=== Chapel of the Pillar of Zaragoza ===
The Chapel of Santa Marta, del Comulgatorio or del Santísimo, at the left end of the main altar, was dedicated from the second half of the 18th century to the cult of the image of the Blessed Our Lady of the Pillar of Zaragoza, brought from Spain by Friar José de Villamar Maldonado, exact copy of the work of the sculptor Pedro de Mena. In the year 1671 the brotherhood was established and three years later the old vault of the Tertiary Order was granted to its brothers. Apparently, this was in force until the middle of the 19th century, registering its last brothers in 1848.

=== Chapel of Cantuña ===
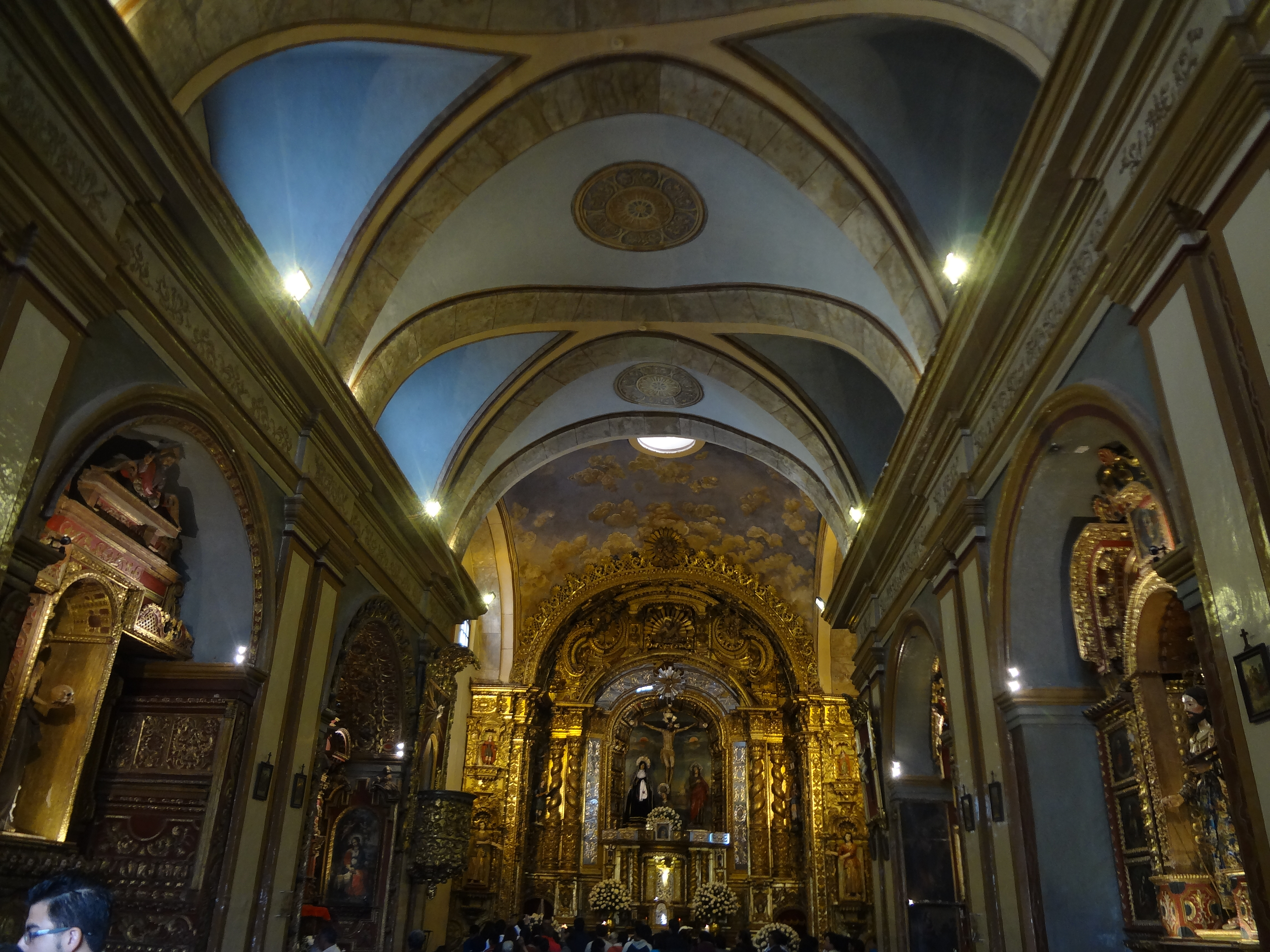
Interior of the Chapel of Cantuña.

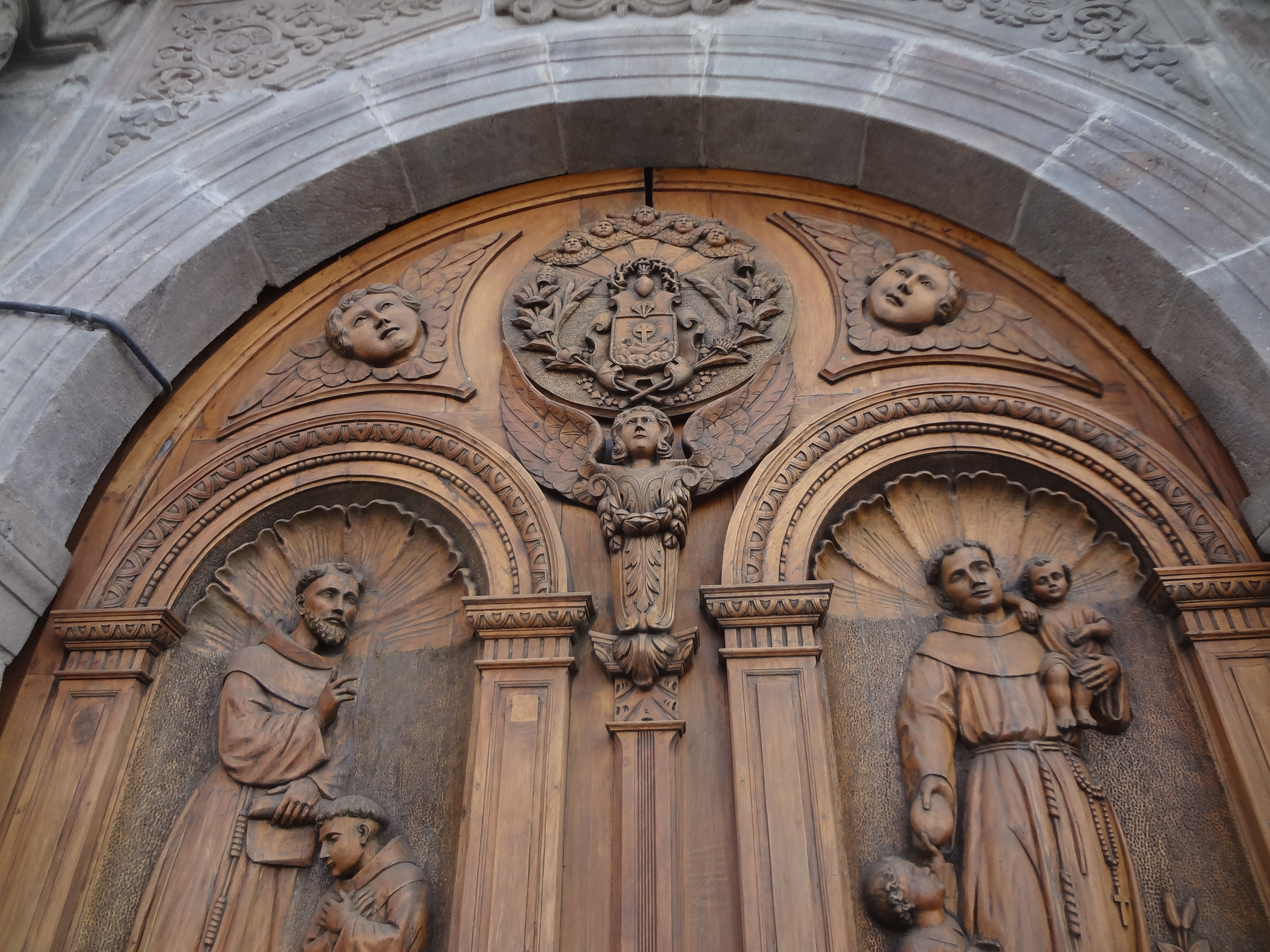
Entrance door to the Chapel of Cantuña.

Originally called the Chapel of la Cofradía de la Veracruz de Naturales,15 it is one of the side chapels of the convent, located at the southern end of the atrium, and which is dedicated to the veneration of the Our Lady of Sorrows and Saint Luke the Evangelist.

It was handed over by the Franciscans to the Brotherhood of the Veracruz de Naturales, made up of the most skilled indigenous sculptors and painters of the city of Quito, who immediately began its construction in 1581. At the end of the 17th century, it was handed over to the Franciscan Third Order and the Brotherhood of la Virgen de los Dolores. The brotherhoods of Veracruz became infatuated with turning the chapel into an authentic reliquary of unique jewels, so the art collection that it housed since its inception, including oil paintings, frescoes and sculptures, they have given it fame as one of the most exquisite on the Americas and the name of the "Sistine Chapel of America" by the Ecuadorians of the time.

The Brotherhood of Veracruz de Naturales enthroned on the main altarpiece the beautiful sculpture of Saint Luke the Evangelist that Father Carlos had carved, considered one of the most beautiful in polychrome wood that the imagery of the Colonial Quito School of Art has given, and that can still be seen on its altar. However, by 1763 the indigenous had already lost all rights, and by successive decrees the space for the cult of the Our Lady of Sorrows, patron saint of a brotherhood also of painters and sculptures, had been authorized, but this whites and mestizos, which had gained greater prestige over time.

According to the legend collected by the proto-historian of the Kingdom of Quito, Father Juan de Velasco, Cantuña was the son of Hualca, who would have helped Rumiñahui to hide the treasures of Quito to free them from Spanish greed. Once urged to reveal the secret of the goods he spent lavishly despite being only an indigenous person, Cantuña said he had made a pact with the devil. Perhaps to redeem himself from such a pact, Cantuña collaborated with a lot of money out of his pocket to see the chapel finished and which has borne his name ever since.

From an aesthetic point of view, the Chapel of Cantuña is a small church with a single vaulted nave, with projecting ribs and lunettes. On the presbytery, which forms a single body with the nave, rests a dome with a lantern through which the light that fills the entire space is filtered. In its rear part is the sacristy and, upon entering the nave, a small choir which is reached through a staircase placed to the right of the entrance to the chapel. Faced with its structural simplicity, in Cantuña the ambivalence between spatial organization and decoration is evident, which, as in the main church, has undergone profound transformations during the 18th century. The altarpiece of the main altar together with the pulpit constitute the most interesting decorative element of the space. Attributed to Bernardo de Legarda, its factory would be related to the enormous prestige achieved by the Brotherhood of la Virgen de los Dolores in the second half of the 18th century. In this characteristically Baroque altarpiece, there is a clear predominance of decorative elements over images; It is complemented by the magnificent Calvary group (of which the Our Lady of Sorrows is a part) placed in its central niche, also attributed to the master. Legarda carved the columns, panels, frieze, cornice, arch, finial and dozens of exquisite elements ornamental. The niches and shelves are full of beautiful sculptures that are also his own; he finally completed the ensemble by giving the central niche a frame of mirrors and silver.

The Chapel of Cantuña also houses works by Caspicara, including one of his masterpieces: the Impression of the Wounds of Saint Francis, a harmonious group full of devout sentiment, whose culmination is the admirable expression of the Saint, lost in pain and illumination. No less impressive is the effigy of Saint Peter of Alcántara, which for a long time was wrongly attributed to Father Carlos.

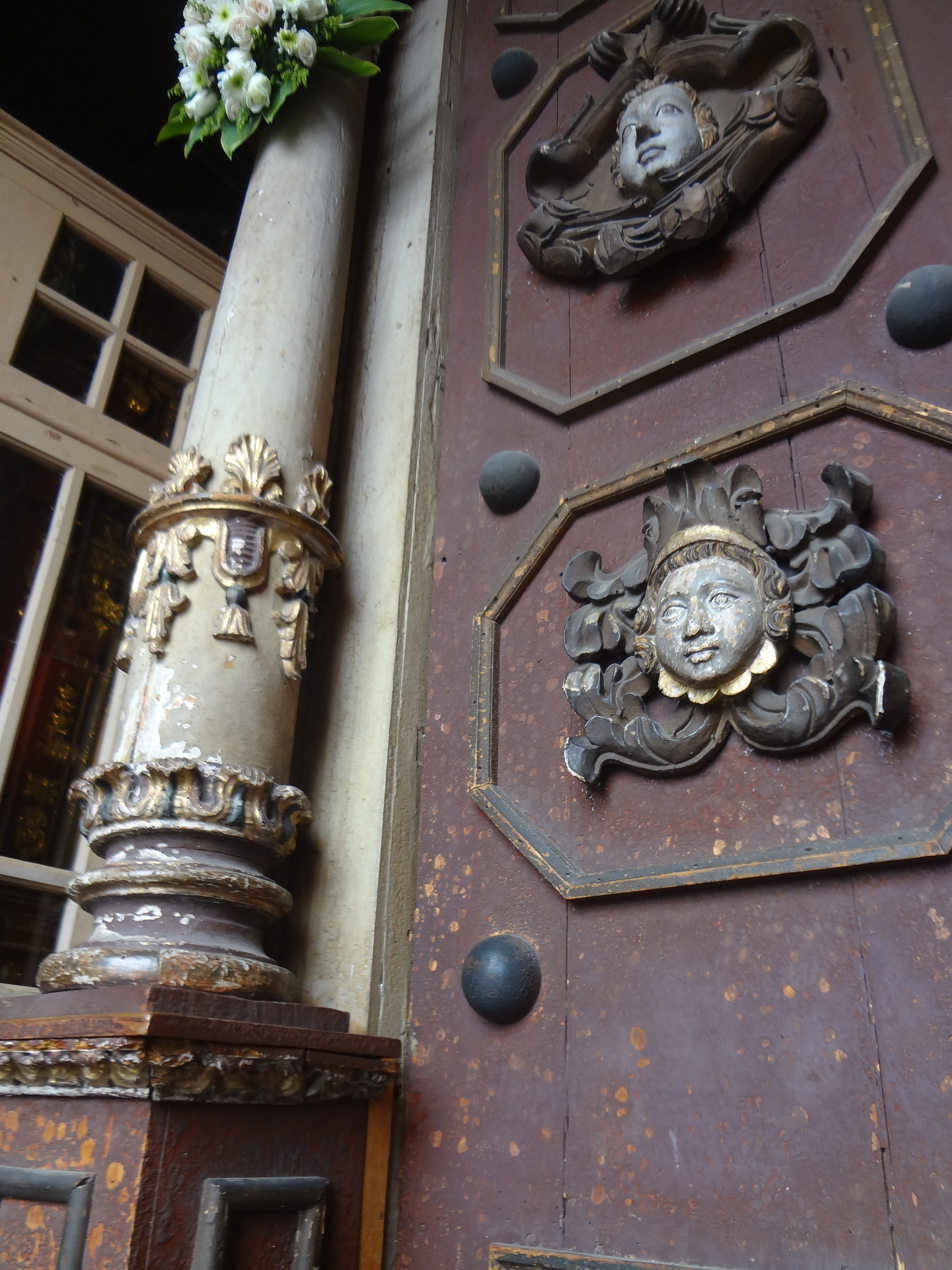
Colonial hand carved interior doors

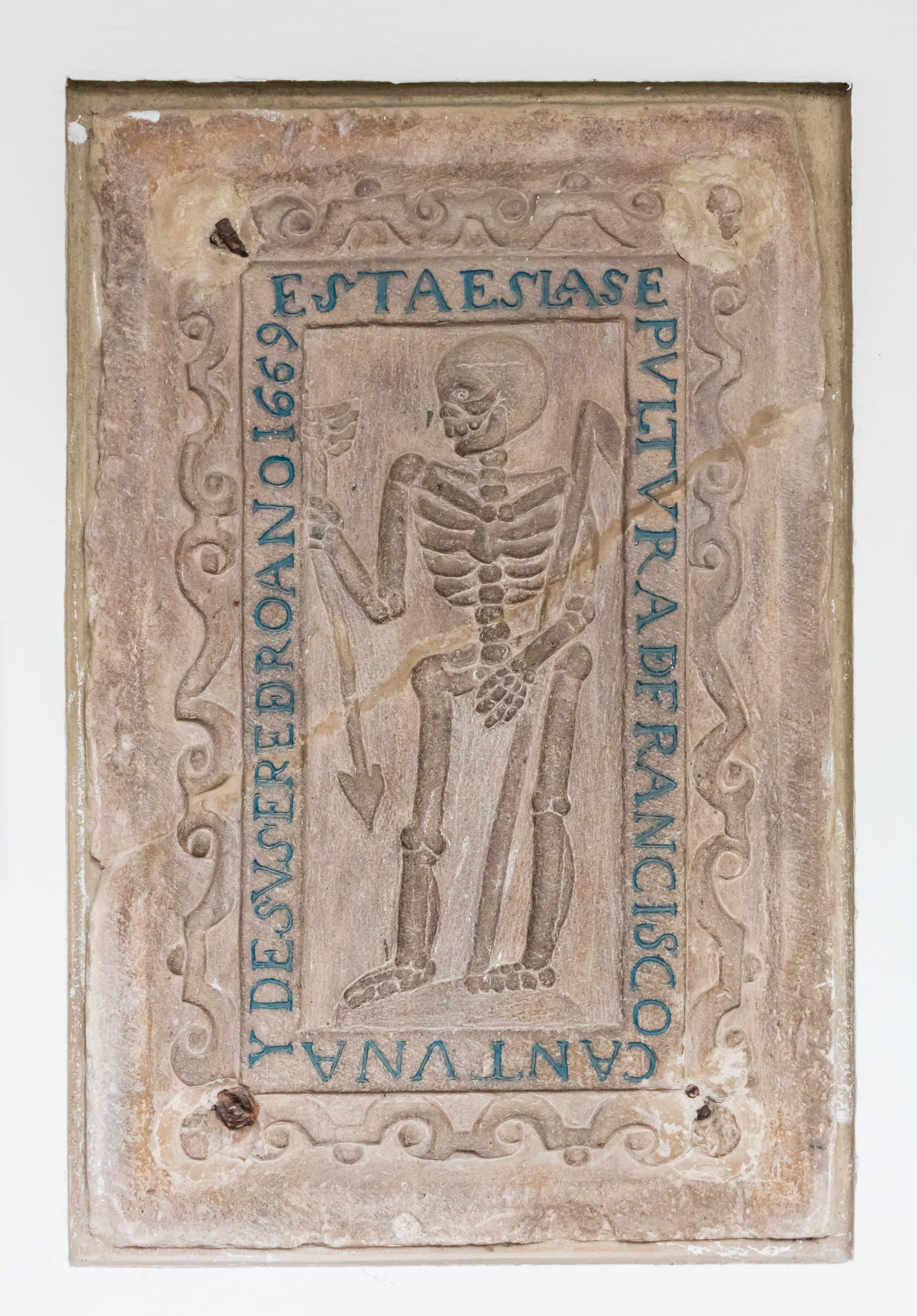
Tomb of Francisco Cantuña and his heirs, at the basilica's Museum.

== Works of art ==
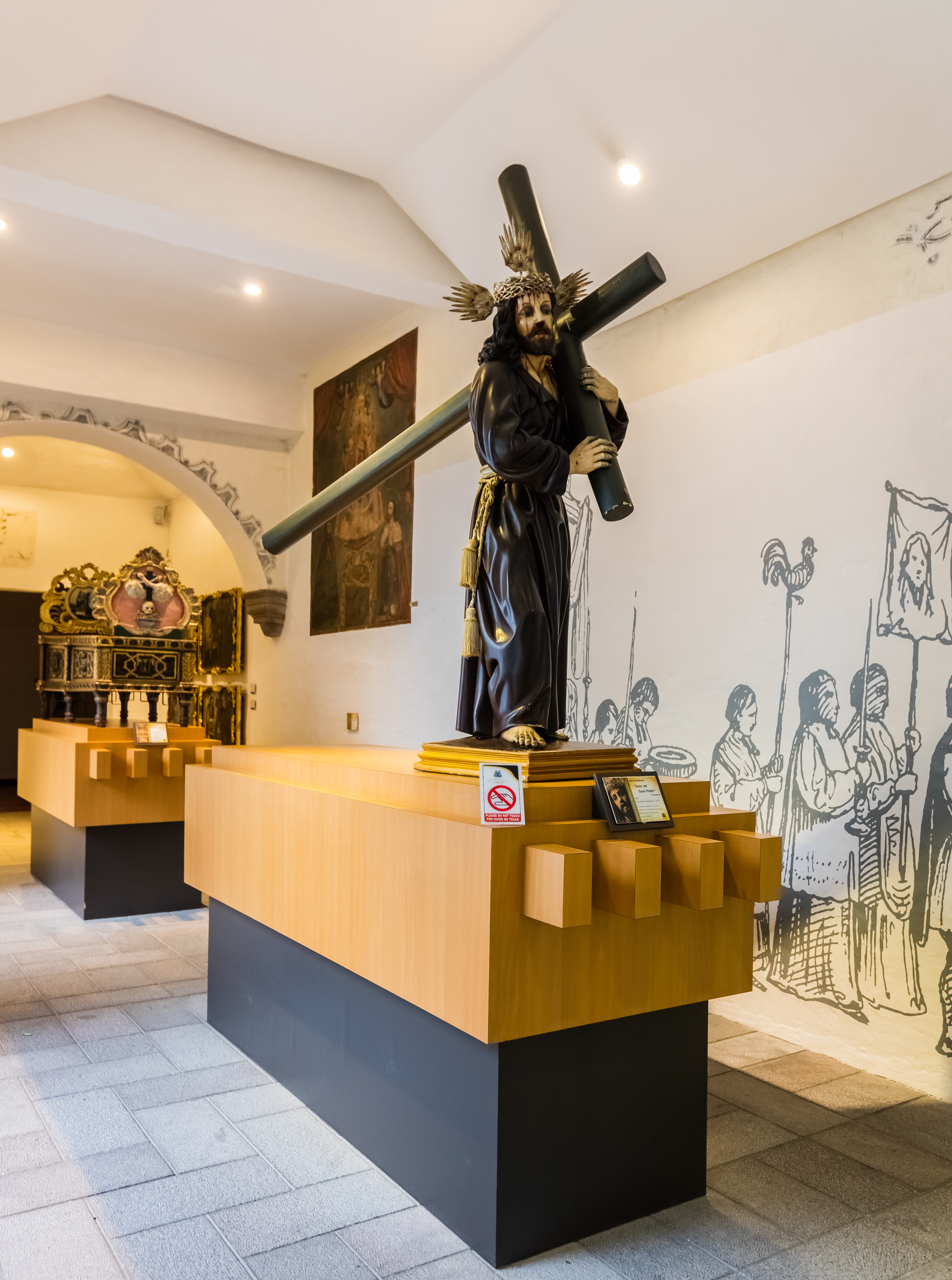
Jesús del Gran Poder, in the basilica Museum.

Being the cradle of the Colonial Quito School of Art, the San Francisco Complex is the largest gallery of this artistic movement. It has over 3,500 objects that cover a period between the 16th and 18th centuries.

=== Sculpture ===
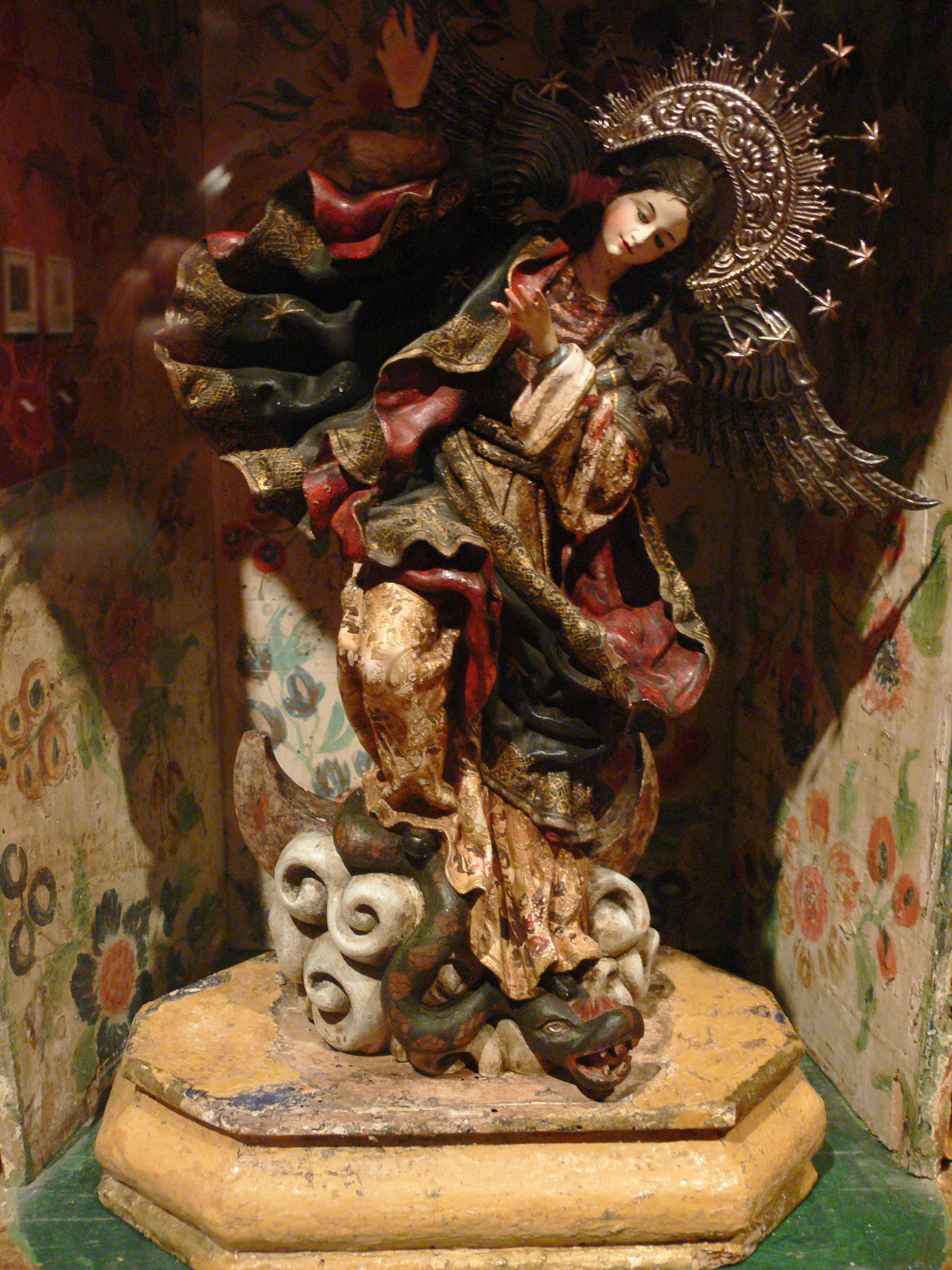
The Virgin of Quito, the original (i.e., main and oldest) sculpture is located at the main altar of this basilica (this photo is a colonial replica exhibited in Germany).

In the main altar of San Francisco, dominated by a large baroque altarpiece and covered in gold leaf, the sculptures of the "Virgin of Quito" by Bernardo de Legarda and the "Jesus del Gran Poder" by Father Carlos stand out; both prominent members of the Colonial Quito School of Art.

Among the most recognized sculptures that the San Francisco complex houses, we have:

Sculpture	Artist	Made in
El Bautismo del Señor (The Baptism of the Lord)	Diego de Robles	16th century
Jesús del Gran Poder (Jesus of the Great Power)	Father Carlos	17th century
Traición de Judas (Judas Betrayal)	José Olmos "Pampite"	17th century
Virgen de Quito (Virgin of Quito)	Bernardo de Legarda	18th century
El Calvario (The Calvary)	Bernardo de Legarda	18th century
San Pedro de Alcántara (Saint Peter of Alcántara)	Manuel Chili "Caspicara"	18th century
La impresión de las llagas de San Francisco (The impression of the wounds of Saint Francis)	Manuel Chili "Caspicara"	18th century
Tránsito de la Virgen (Transit of the Virgin)	Manuel Chili "Caspicara"	18th century
Virgen del Carmen (Virgin of the Carmel)	Manuel Chili "Caspicara"	18th century
San José (Saint Joseph)	Manuel Chili "Caspicara"	18th century

The mobility of the sculpture of the Virgin of Quito, whose model would have been a restless girl niece of the sculptor, generates such visual appeal that its replicas have become an emblematic gift from the Quito council to its foreign guests. The Jesús del Gran Poder is the main icon of one of the two largest religious processions on Good Friday in Ecuador, which brings together popular strata, in an act of curucuhos and penitents, in the purest medieval style, evoking the Spanish Seville.

The two side naves of the church are filled with sculptures of saints placed on altarpieces covered in gold leaf, before whom hundreds of faithful kneel every day to implore miraculous "intercessions".

=== Painting ===
The monastic and clerical complex of San Francisco is also a large art gallery that displays dozens of paintings by famous Quitoan and European painters. Many of its works belong to the Colonial Quito School of Art, a style that was emerged in the courtyards of the convent.

Among the most relevant pictorial works of San Francisco, we have:

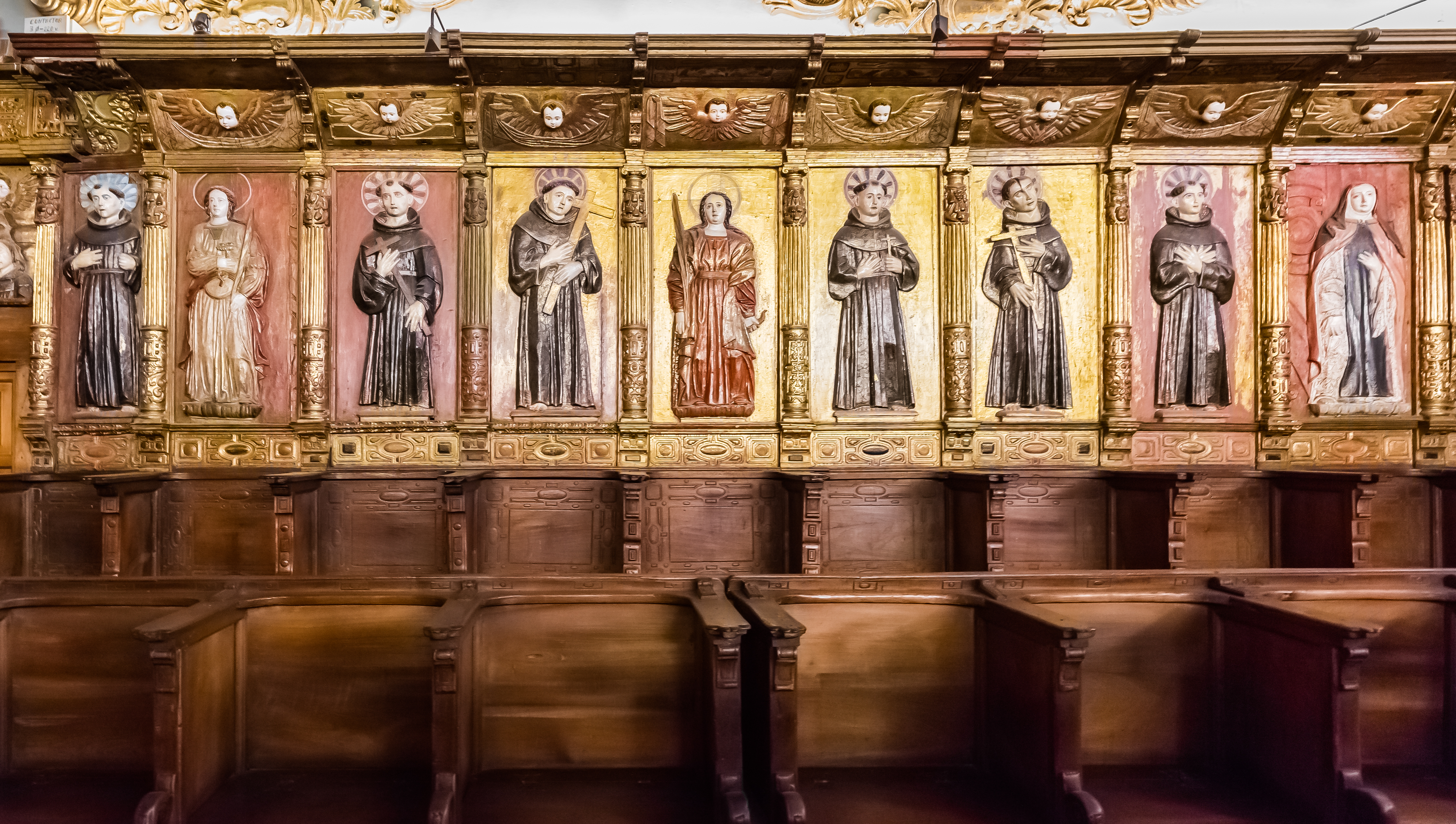
The basilica's choir stalls, although made in the early-17th century, belong to the late Renaissance, whose sculptural panels were carved by the Quitoan Friar Juan Benítez.

Painting	Author	Made in
Third Order series of 15 paintings	Andrés Sánchez de Gallque	16th century
Genealogy of the Franciscan Order	Unknown	16th century
Saint Francis of Assisi	Francisco de Zurbarán	17th century
Jesus sentenced to death	Miguel de Santiago	17th century
Jesus with the cross	Miguel de Santiago	17th century
Jesus falls the third time	Miguel de Santiago	17th century
Veronica wipes the face of Jesus	Miguel de Santiago	17th century
The Descent	Bernardo Rodríguez	18th century
Saint Camillus de Lellis	Bernardo Rodríguez	18th century
Immaculate Crowned by the Holy Trinity	Bernardo Rodríguez	18th century
The Miracles of Saint Anthony of Padua series of 12 paintings	Bernardo Rodríguez	18th century

The convent also keeps a series of 16 easel paintings exhibited in the zaguan, corresponding to the 17th century and attributed to Miguel de Santiago. The series known as The life of Saint Francis of Assisi, for its part, is a collection of 27 large easel canvases attributed to different artists, which are located in the corridors of the main cloister.

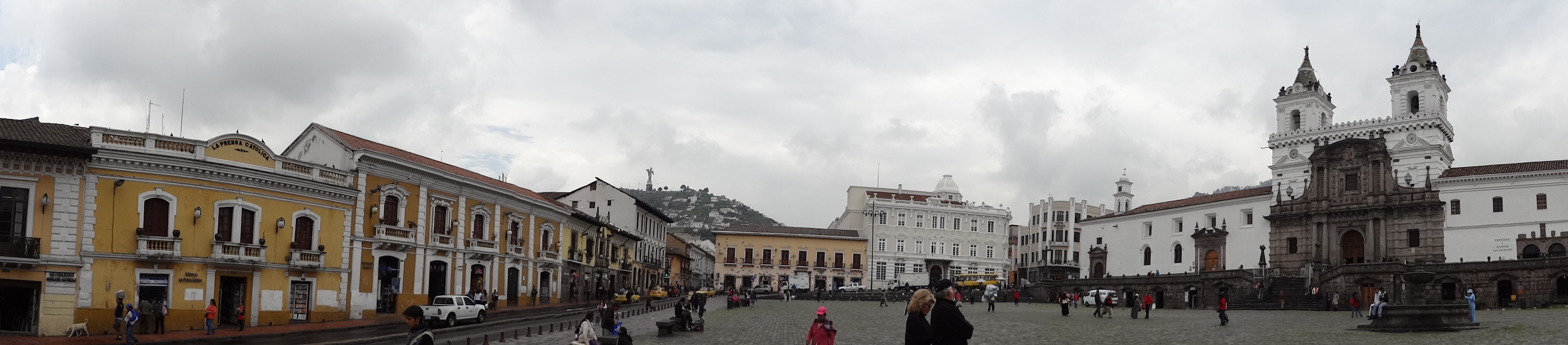
Plaza de San Francisco (Basilica and Convent of San Francisco) in the Historic Center of Quito

== See also ==
- List of buildings in Quito
