= Bernardo de Legarda =

- Born: c. 1700; Royal Audiencia of Quito
- Died: 1 June 1773; Royal Audiencia of Quito
- Known for: Sculpture, painting
- Movement: Quito School (Escuela Quiteña)

Bernardo de Legarda (c. 1700 – 1 June 1773) was one of the most important artists of the Quito School movement.

== Biography ==
Legarda was a mestizo artist and the one who best personified the art of sculpture in the capital of Quito during his period. His first artwork dated from 1731 when he restored an image of Saint Luke in the Church of Santo Domingo, after which he was much in demand. In 1732 he was commissioned to do a sculpture of the Immaculate Conception for the Church of San Francisco. This work, which became known as the Virgin of Quito (1734), met with great approval and countless copies and imitations were made throughout the Royal Audiencia of Quito (roughly present day Ecuador, southern Colombia and northern Peru).

With regard to his activity with altarpieces, one must emphasize well-documented baroque features in his work such as the altarpiece of Mercy (1748–51), completed by his disciple named Gregorio, as well as the altarpiece Moderno del Carmen, which is attributed to his disciple and Legarda Jacinto Lopez.

== Works ==
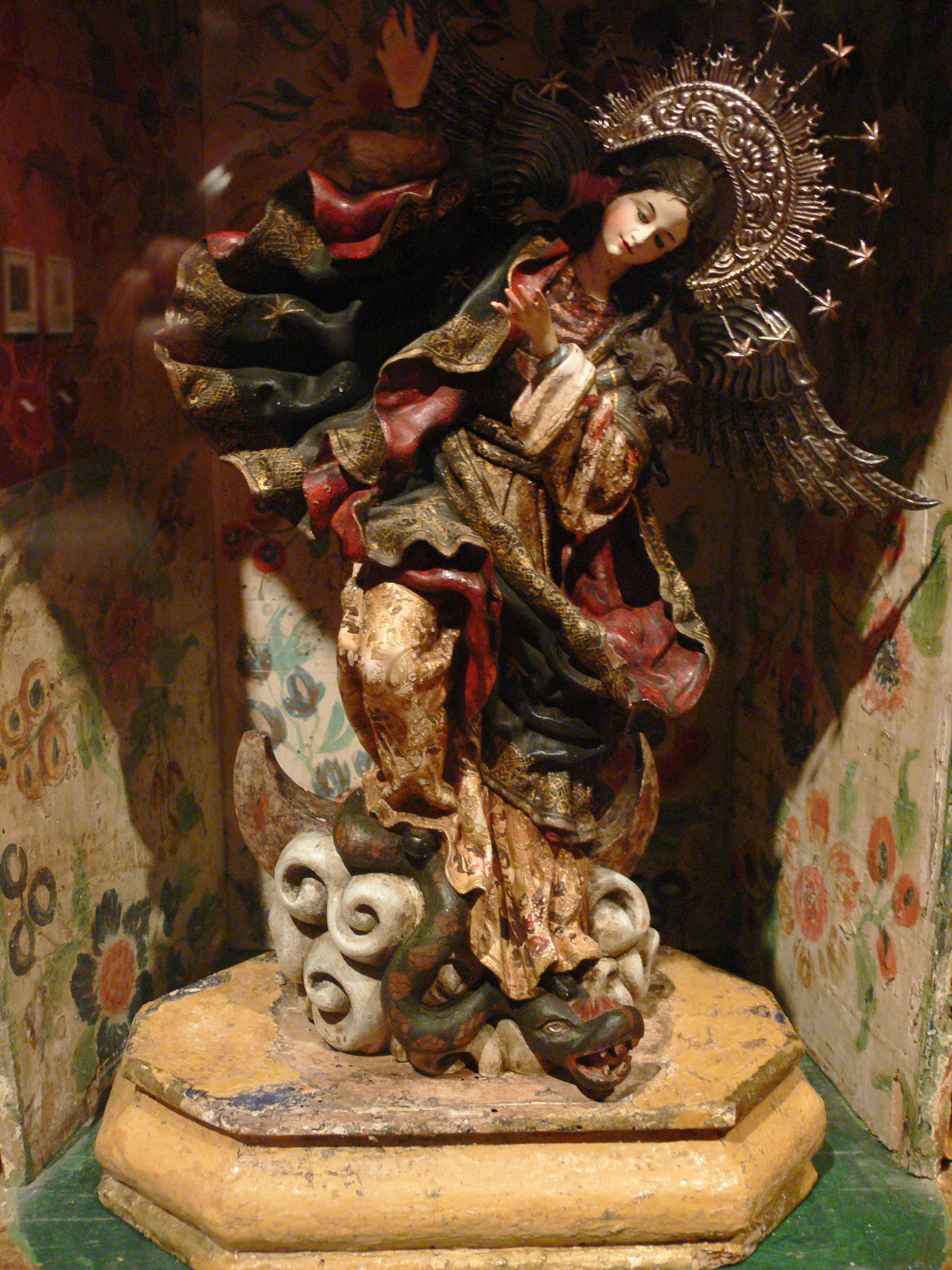
House altar with the Virgin of Quito. Wood, polychromy. 18th–20th century.

Virgin of Quito, also known as Virgin of El Panecillo (due to its location on top of El Panecillo hill). It is a 41 m monument commissioned to Spanish Sculptor Agustín de la Herrán Matorras in the 1970s. It follows Legarda's wooden depictions of the same theme.

- Immaculate Conception of the Apocalypse ("Virgin of Quito"), 1734; altar of the Church of San Francisco in Quito
- Inmaculada Concepción de Popayán (Our Lady of the Assumption of Popayán), Catedral de Nuestra Señora de la Asunción (Cathedral of our Lady of the Assumption) in Popayán, Colombia
- The back of the Tabernacle of the La Iglesia de la Compañía de Jesús, Quito
- The decoration of the half dome of the La Iglesia de El Sagrario, Quito.
- The high altar reredos of the Basílica de Nuestra Señora de la Merced and the enclosure under the choir of La Iglesia de Santo Domingo in quito
- Legarda created a series of Immaculate Conceptions ("Virgins of Quito") and Assumptions.
  - The first are of various sizes — large, medium and small — especially in Franciscan churches of Quito, such as San Francisco, Guápulo, Santa Clara (in the market in the center of the city) and la Concepción.
- Legarda, who was also skilled jeweler, did many figures for Nativities.
