= Elimelech (given name) =

Elimelech is a biblical figure in the Book of Ruth.

Other people with the name Elimelech include:

== Mononym ==
- Elimelech of Lizhensk (1717–1787), Polish rabbi

== Given name ==
- Elimelech Biderman (born 1967), Israeli rabbi
- Elimelech Szapira (1823–1892), Polish Hasidic rebbe
- Elimelech Tress, Jewish-American organization leader
- Elimelekh Rimalt (1907– 1987), Israeli politician and Zionist activist

== Middle name ==
- Avraham Elimelech Firer, Israeli rabbi and founder
- Dror Elimelech Feiler, Swedish musician
- Zvi Elimelech Halberstam, Israeli rabbi
- Tzvi Elimelech Spira of Dinov, Polish Hasidic rebbe

== Surname ==
- Anat Elimelech (1974–1997), Israeli fashion model
- Dror Elimelech, Israeli psychiatrist, psychotherapist, poet, and composer
- Israel Elimelech, Israeli basketball point guard
- Menachem Elimelech, American engineer
- Nava Elimelech (1970/1971–1982), Israeli murder victim
- Ohad Elimelech, Israeli artist and photographer
- Shavit Elimelech (born 1971), Israeli football goalkeeper
- Stav Elimelech (born 1969), Israeli football defensive midfielder

== See also ==
- "Der Rebbe Elimelech", 1927 Yiddish song about Elimelech of Lizhensk
