= HaMerotz LaMillion 7 =

Season of television series

- Season 7
- Presented by: Ron Shahar
- No. of teams: 12
- Winners: Matija "Tia" Galili & Fatima "Fay" Jakite
- No. of legs: 12
- Distance traveled: 30,000 km (19,000 mi)
- No. of episodes: 24 (26 including recaps)

Release
- Original network: Channel 13
- Original release: 15 July – 25 September 2019

Additional information
- Filming dates: 4 November – 29 November 2018

Series chronology
- ← Previous; Season 6 Next → Season 8

HaMerotz LaMillion 7 is the seventh season of HaMerotz LaMillion (Hebrew: המירוץ למיליון, lit. The Race to the Million), an Israeli reality competition show based on the American series The Amazing Race. It featured 12 teams of two with a pre-existing relationship in a race around the Eastern Hemisphere to win ₪1,000,000. Starting in Jerusalem, racers traveled through Israel, South Africa, Zambia, Zimbabwe, Mauritius, Nepal, China, and the Philippines before returning to Israel and finishing in Tel Aviv.

The season premiered on 15 July 2019 on Channel 13 with the finale on 22 September 2019 and was hosted by Ron Shahar.

Models Matija "Tia" Galili and Fatima "Fay" Jakite were the winners of this season, while newlyweds Karin and Ariel Kleinberg finished second, and twins Haviv and Itzak Maman finished third.

== Production ==
=== Development and filming ===
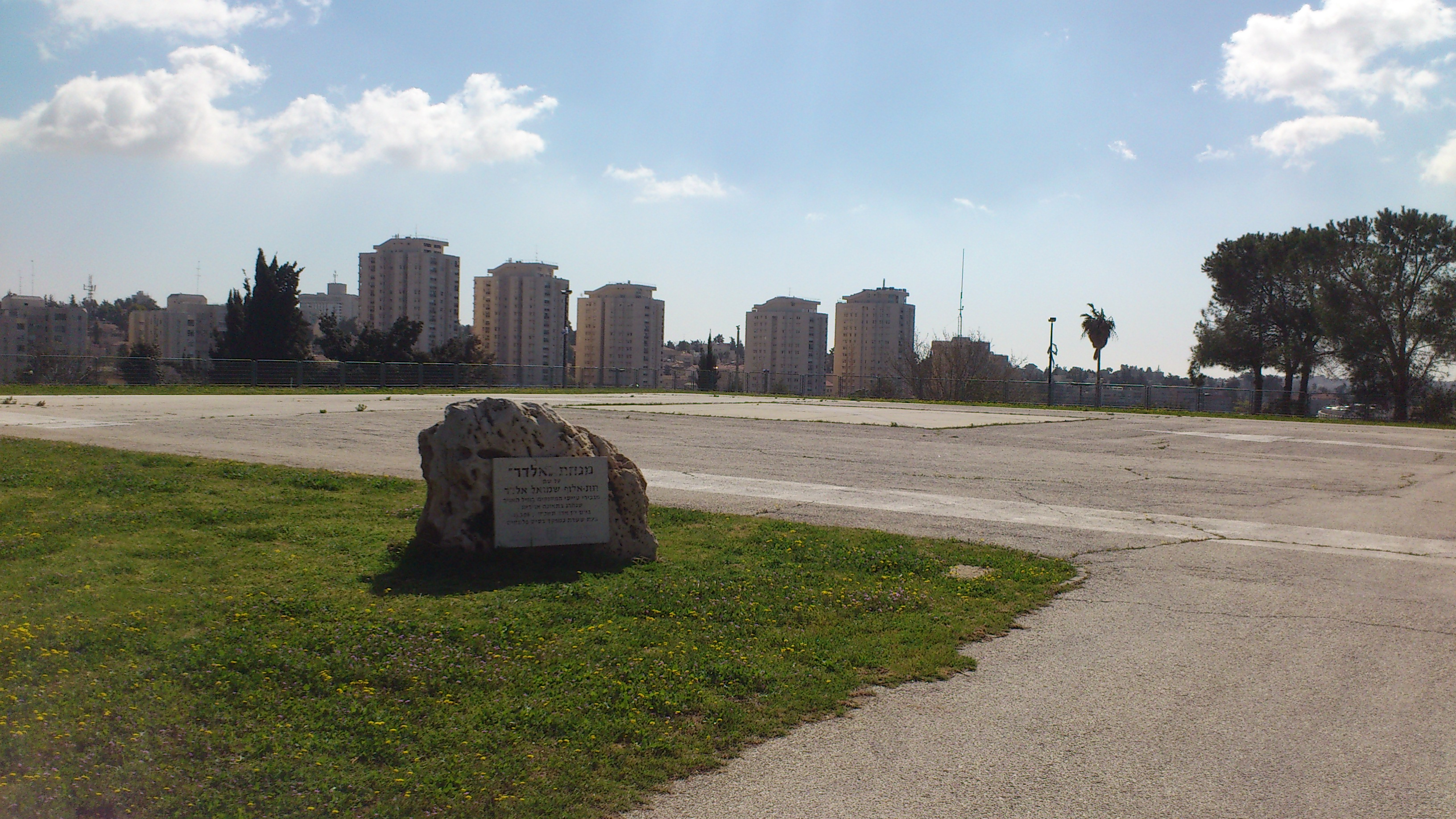
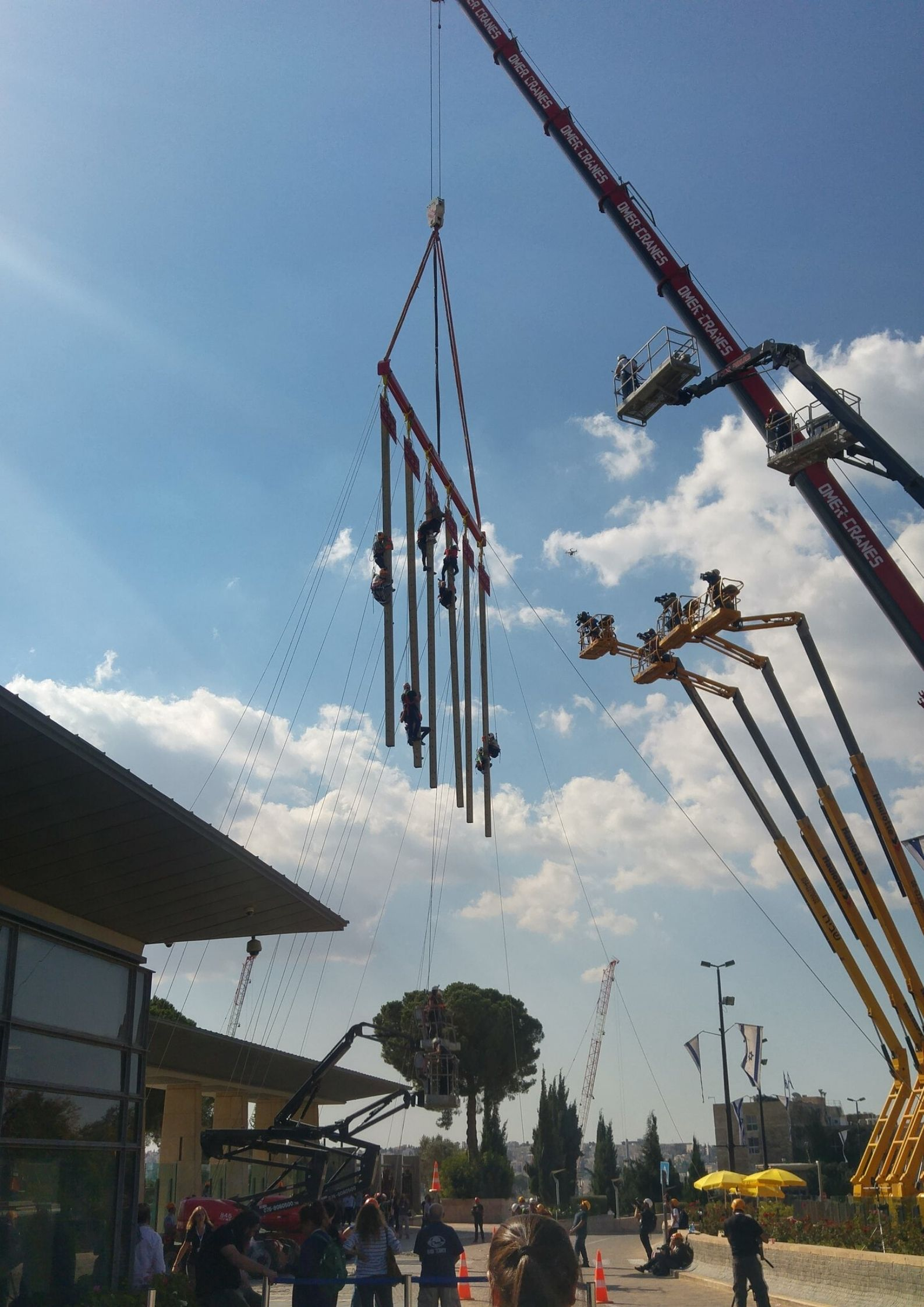
Teams started HaMerotz LaMillion 7 at the Wohl Rose Park helipad in Jerusalem before performing their first task outside of the Knesset.

In October 2018, news broke that Reshet would be filming the seventh and eighth seasons of HaMerotz LaMillion back-to-back with filming set to begin in November and into December. This is the first Amazing Race franchise to film two installments during a 54-day production.

Filming for the seventh season began on 4 November 2018, when passersby noticed a crane and Amazing Race flags on the grounds of the Knesset. Speaker Yuli-Yoel Edelstein later confirmed in a statement that the Knesset was being used as a filming location for HaMerotz LaMillion as part of the seventieth anniversary celebration of the establishment of the legislature. The next day, the teams were spotted at Ben Gurion Airport.

The season visited two continents and eight countries and was the first time that an Amazing Race franchise visited Nepal, a country which has yet to be visited by the original American edition.

This season also included a companion series that aired on ZOOM entitled Zoom in on the Race, which featured comedians Duvdevani and Kovach following the filming of the season.

=== Casting ===
At the end of the finale of the previous season, host Ron Shahar announced that casting for the seventh season had begun.

=== Marketing ===
Harel Group and Spring returned as sponsors for the season alongside 5 Gum, Hot, Nature Valley, Škoda Auto, Under Armour, James Richardson Corporation, Shufersal, and the Knesset.

== Cast ==
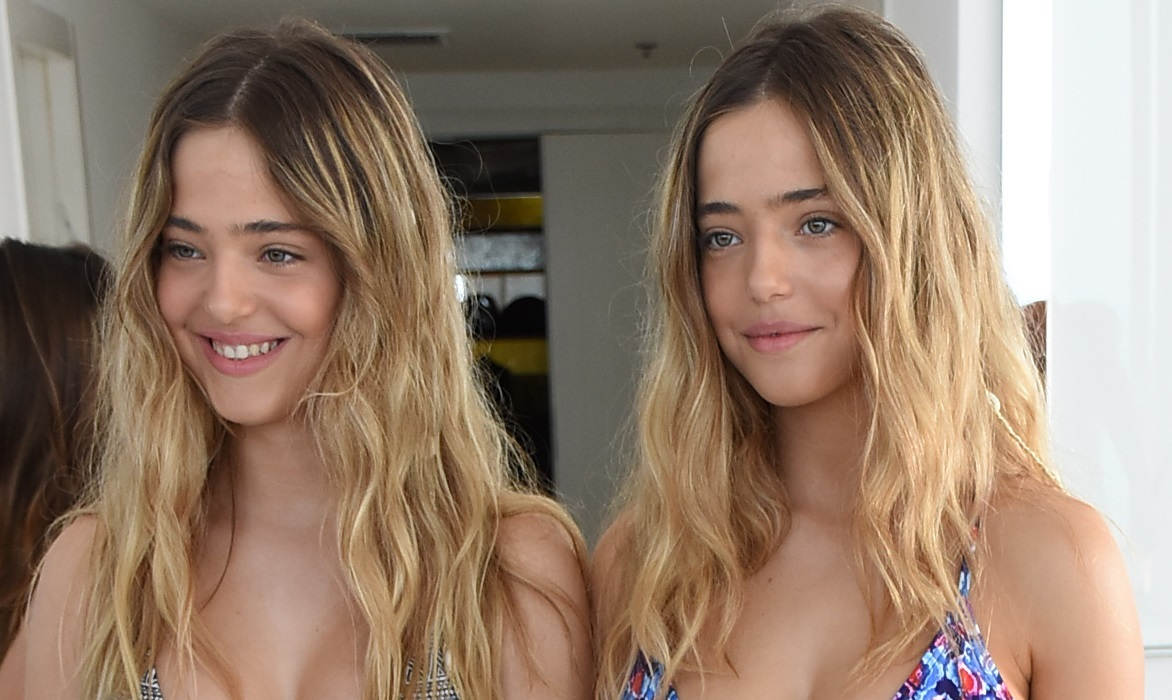
Noy and Hadar Karako

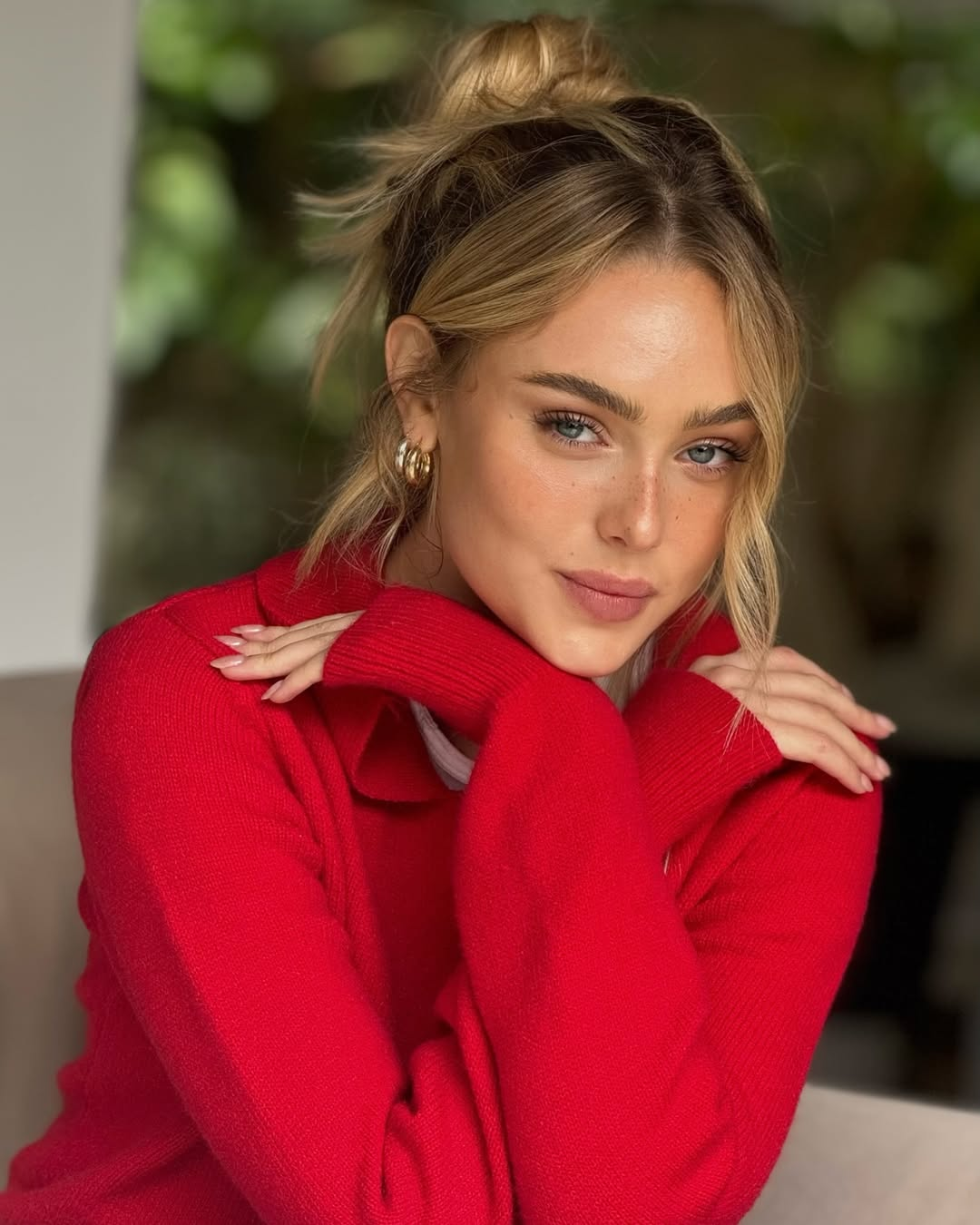
Omer Nudelman

On June 19, 2019, the cast photos were posted on the show's Instagram page with the cast bios released five days later. The cast for this season included former child actresses Noy and Hadar Karako. Tia & Fay were part of the cast of HaMerotz LaMillion 6 but were removed before filming and replaced with another team due to a missing travel visa. Haviv and Itzhak Maman were previously contestants on Eyal Golan Is Calling You. Gili is the mother of Yarden, who raced on the previous and subsequent seasons, and previously appeared on episode twenty-eight of the sixth season during a video chat with her daughter, while she was racing in Bishkek, Kyrgyzstan.

Contestants	Age	Relationship	Hometown	Status
Noy Karako (נוי)	20	Identical Twins	Ginaton	Eliminated 1st (in Cape Town, South Africa)
Hadar Karako (הדר)	20	Identical Twins	Ginaton	Eliminated 1st (in Cape Town, South Africa)
Kamle Hassian (כאמלה)	24	Childhood Friends	Jaffa	Eliminated 2nd (in Cape Town, South Africa)
Bahira Ablassi (בהירה)	24	Childhood Friends	Jaffa	Eliminated 2nd (in Cape Town, South Africa)
Yehudit Elkobi (יהודית)	51	Mother & Daughter	Modi'in-Maccabim-Re'ut	Eliminated 3rd (in Livingstone, Zambia)
Zohar Elkobi (זוהר)	24	Mother & Daughter	Modi'in-Maccabim-Re'ut	Eliminated 3rd (in Livingstone, Zambia)
Ben Levayev (בן)	24	Coworkers	Bat Yam	Eliminated 4th (in Victoria Falls, Zimbabwe)
Ran Gihr (רן)	23	Coworkers	Bat Yam	Eliminated 4th (in Victoria Falls, Zimbabwe)
Michal Krits (מיכל)	19	Instagram Stars	Irus	Eliminated 5th (in Grand Bassin, Mauritius)
Omer Nudelman (עומר)	21	Instagram Stars	Neta'im	Eliminated 5th (in Grand Bassin, Mauritius)
Eden Katz (עדן)	24	Married with a Child	Rehovot	Eliminated 6th (in Kathmandu, Nepal)
Aviad Katz (אביעד)	37	Married with a Child	Rehovot	Eliminated 6th (in Kathmandu, Nepal)
Tali Ben-Ari (טלי)	58	Best Friends	Givatayim	Eliminated 7th (in Kathmandu, Nepal)
Gili Vizel (גילי)	54	Best Friends	Givatayim	Eliminated 7th (in Kathmandu, Nepal)
Nisim David (ניסים)	26	Siblings	Kiryat Malakhi	Eliminated 8th (in Shanghai, China)
Orel Elimelech (אוראל)	29	Siblings	Kiryat Malakhi	Eliminated 8th (in Shanghai, China)
Eyal Daniel (איל)	24	Friends from Unit 8200	Neve Monosson	Eliminated 9th (in Manila, Philippines)
Sidney "Sid" Feiner (סיד)	23	Friends from Unit 8200	Neve Monosson	Eliminated 9th (in Manila, Philippines)
Haviv Maman (חביב)	30	Twins	Tel Aviv	Third Place
Itzak Maman (יצחק)	30	Twins	Tel Aviv	Third Place
Karin Kleinberg (קארין)	22	Newlyweds	Sderot	Second Place
Ariel Kleinberg (אריאל)	23	Newlyweds	Sderot	Second Place
Fatima "Fey" Jakite (פיי)	23	Models	Tel Aviv	Winners
Tia Galili (טיה)	23	Models	Tel Aviv	Winners

Future appearances

In 2025, Omer Nudelman competed on the eleventh season of Rokdim Im Kokhavim.

== Results ==
The following teams participated in the season, with their relationships at the time of filming. Note that this table is not necessarily reflective of all content broadcast on television due to inclusion or exclusion of some data. Placements are listed in finishing order:

Team	Position (by leg)													Roadblocks performed
Team	1	2	3+	4+	5+	6	7+	8	9+	10+	11^{3}		12	Roadblocks performed
Tia & Fay	6th	2nd^{«}_{>}°	6th	7th<	5th<	8th⊂	1st>	1st>	4th>	1st>	1st	2nd	1st	Tia 1, Fay 1
Ariel & Karin	7th	5th»*	5th	4th>	4th>	4th⊃	4th	6th	3rd	2nd»	4th	1st	2nd	Ariel 1, Karin 1
Haviv & Itzhak	4th	1st»+	2nd	1st>	1st>	2nd	5th	3rd>	1st	3rd«	2nd	3rd	3rd	Haviv 1, Itzhak 1
Eyal & Sid	1st	4th«+	1st>	3rd>	2nd>	7th⊃	7th−	2nd	2nd<	4th^{<}_{»}	3rd	4th		Eyal 1, Sid 1
Nisim & Orel	12th	6th≥^	7th	6th	8th	5th	6th>	4th>	5th>−	5th>−				Nisim 0, Orel 2
Tali & Gili	10th	7th≤^	8th	2nd	3rd	6th	3rd>	5th>	6th>					Tali 1, Gili 1
Aviad & Eden	3rd	3rd<°	3rd	5th	6th	1st⊃	2nd<	7th<						Aviad 0, Eden 2
Michal & Omer	8th	10th–	9th>	9th−	7th	3rd	8th							Michal 1, Omer 1
Ran & Ben	9th	9th»*	4th<	8th>	9th>−									Ran 1, Ben 1
Yehoudit & Zohar	2nd	8th»~^{1}	10th−^{2}	10th										Yehoudit 1, Zohar 0
Kamle & Bahira	11th	11th≥–	11th											Kamle 1, Bahira 0
Noy & Hadar	5th	12th>~^{1}												Noy 0, Hadar 0

Key

- A red team placement means the team was eliminated.
- A blue team placement indicates that the team was the last to arrive at a Pit Stop in a non-elimination leg.
  - An underlined blue team's placement indicates that the team came in last on a non-elimination leg and were on a second flight that arrived two hours after the other teams during the subsequent leg.
- An orange + indicates that there was a Duel on this leg, while an orange − indicates the team that lost the Duel and received a 15-minute penalty.
- A yellow <, orange «, olive ≤ or red « indicates the team who received a Yield; >, », ≥ and » indicates that the team voted for the recipient.
- A brown ⊂ indicates the team who received a U-Turn; ⊃ indicates that the team voted for the recipient.
- Matching colored symbols (teal +, magenta °, orange *, olive ~, brown ^ and fuchsia –) indicate teams who worked together during part of the leg as a result of an Intersection.
- Italicized results indicate the position of the team at the midpoint of a two-part leg.

Notes

1. ^^{a} ^{b} During the Intersection, Hadar fell and injured her arm; unfit to continue, Noy & Hadar did not complete the remainder of the leg, and instead they were directly sent to the Pit Stop for elimination. Yehoudit & Zohar, who were intersected along with Noy & Hadar, were forced to quit the Intersection; however, they were not issued a penalty.
2. Yehoudit & Zohar elected to forfeit the final match of the Duel and accept the 15-minute penalty.
3. Leg 11 was a combined double-length leg. The placements listed in the first column reflect the order teams finished the sticky tofu task.

=== Voting history ===
Teams may vote to choose either U-Turn or Yield. The team with the most votes received the U-Turn or Yield penalty, depending on the respective leg.

	Yield				U-Turn	Yield			
Leg #	2	3	4	5	6	7	8	9	10
U-Turned/Yielded	Aviad & Eden; Eyal & Sid; Tali & Gili; Tia & Fay	Ran & Ben	Tia & Fay	Tia & Fay	Tia & Fay	Aviad & Eden	Aviad & Eden	Eyal & Sid	Eyal & Sid; Haviv & Itzhak
Result	2–2–2–2–1–1–1–1	2–1–1–1–1–1–1–1–1–1	4–3–2–1	4–1–1–1–1–1	3–2–2–1	3–2–1–1–1	4–2–1	3–1–1–1	2–2–1
Voter	Team's Vote								
Tia & Fay	Aviad & Eden	Haviv & Itzhak	Ariel & Karin	Eyal & Sid	Eyal & Sid	Aviad & Eden	Aviad & Eden	Eyal & Sid	Eyal & Sid
Ariel & Karin	Tia & Fay	Tia & Fay	Tia & Fay	Tia & Fay	Tia & Fay	Haviv & Itzhak	Haviv & Itzhak	Haviv & Itzhak	Haviv & Itzhak
Haviv & Itzhak	Tia & Fay	Aviad & Eden	Tia & Fay	Tia & Fay	Eyal & Sid	Michal & Omer	Aviad & Eden	Tia & Fay	Ariel & Karin
Eyal & Sid	Yehoudit & Zohar	Ran & Ben	Tia & Fay	Tia & Fay	Tia & Fay	Tia & Fay	Tali & Gili	Tali & Gili	Haviv & Itzhak
Nisim & Orel	Tali & Gili	Yehoudit & Zohar	Yehoudit & Zohar	Aviad & Eden	Aviad & Eden	Aviad & Eden	Aviad & Eden	Eyal & Sid	Eyal & Sid
Tali & Gili	Kamle & Bahira	Kamle & Bahira	Yehoudit & Zohar	Michal & Omer	Aviad & Eden	Aviad & Eden	Aviad & Eden	Eyal & Sid	
Aviad & Eden	Noy & Hadar	Nisim & Orel	Nisim & Orel	Tali & Gili	Tia & Fay	Nisim & Orel	Tali & Gili		
Michal & Omer	Ran & Ben	Ran & Ben	Yehoudit & Zohar	Haviv & Itzhak	Haviv & Itzhak	Haviv & Itzhak			
Ran & Ben	Eyal & Sid	Michal & Omer	Tia & Fay	Tia & Fay					
Yehoudit & Zohar	Eyal & Sid	Eyal & Sid	Nisim & Orel						
Kamle & Bahira	Tali & Gili	Tali & Gili							
Noy & Hadar	Aviad & Eden								

== Episode Titles ==
Translated from Hebrew from the official website:

1. Taking Off! (יוצאים לדרך!) (Leg 1)
2. Welcome to Cape Town! (וולקאם טו קייפטאון!) (Leg 2)
3. The First Team is Eliminated from the Game (הזוג הראשון מודח מהמשחק) (Leg 2)
4. Battle of the Penguins (מלחמת הפינגווינים) (Leg 3)
5. The Human Spinner (הספינר האנושי) (Leg 3)
6. The Second Team is Eliminated from the Game (הזוג השני מודח מהמשחק) (Leg 3)
7. Landing in Zambia (נוחתים בזמביה) (Leg 4)
8. The Third Team is Eliminated from the Game (הזוג השלישי מודח מהמשחק) (Leg 4)
9. The Forbidden Bungee in Zimbabwe (הבאנג'י האסור בזימבבואה) (Leg 5)
10. Elimination in Zimbabwe (הדחה בזימבבואה) (Leg 5)
11. Landing in Mauritius (נוחתים במאוריציוס) (Leg 6)
12. Elimination in Mauritius (הדחה במאוריציוס) (Leg 6)
13. The Buffet War (מלחמת הבופה) (Leg 7)
14. Elimination in Mauritius (הדחה במאוריציוס) (Leg 7)
15. The Secret Cameras (המצלמות הסודיות) (Recap)
16. Landing in Nepal (נוחתים בנפאל) (Leg 8)
17. Elimination in Nepal (הדחה בנפאל) (Leg 8)
18. Duel in Nepal (דו-קרב בנפאל) (Leg 9)
19. Who Will Rise to the Quarterfinals? (יעלה לרבע הגמר?) (Leg 9)
20. Shanghai Quarterfinals – Part 1 (רבע הגמר בשנגחאי – חלק 1) (Leg 10)
21. Shanghai Quarterfinals – Part 2 (רבע הגמר בשנגחאי – חלק 2) (Leg 10)
22. The Shanghai Semifinals (חצי הגמר בשנגחאי) (Leg 11)
23. The Shanghai Semifinals – Part 2 (חצי הגמר בשנגחאי – חלק 2) (Leg 11)
24. The Last Elimination (ההדחה האחרונה) (Leg 11)
25. HaMerotz LaMillion Finals (גמר המירוץ למיליון) (Leg 12)
26. Reunion (האיחוד) (Recap)

== Prizes ==
The prize for each leg, with the exception of Leg 11, was awarded to the first place team for that leg. Gift cards were provided by Shufersal Travel, and the ₪1,000,000 was provided by Harel Group. The prizes were:

- Legs 1-10 – A gift card
- Leg 12 – ₪1,000,000

== Race summary ==
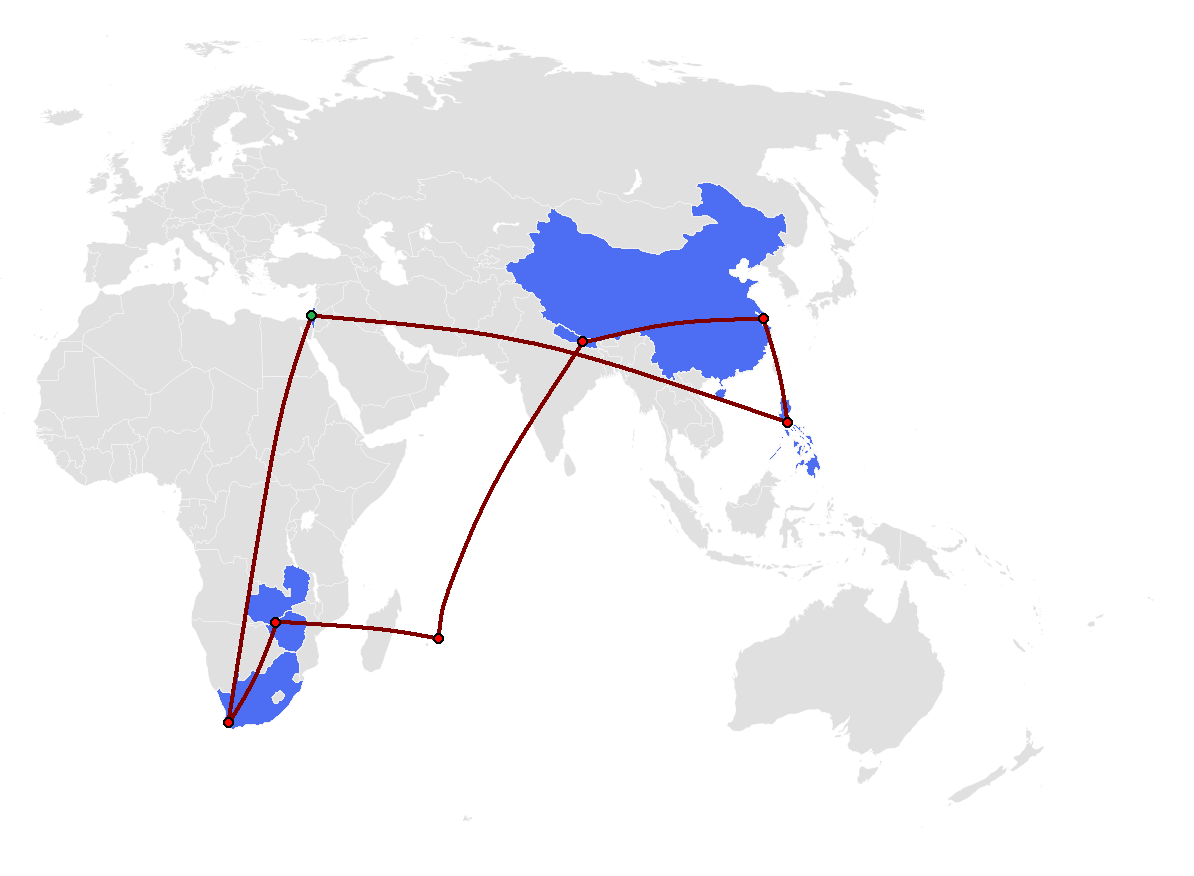
Racecourse for HaMerotz LaMillion 7. Green dot indicates the Starting Line and Finish Line.

Destinations	Air travel Rail travel Water travel Bus travel Helicopter travel Bicycle travel Gondola travel
Route Markers	צומת (Detour) מחסום (Roadblock) עצור (Yield) מסלול משותף (Intersection) סיבוב פרסה (U-Turn) דו–קרב (Duel) נקודת סיום (Pit Stop)

=== Leg 1 (Israel) ===
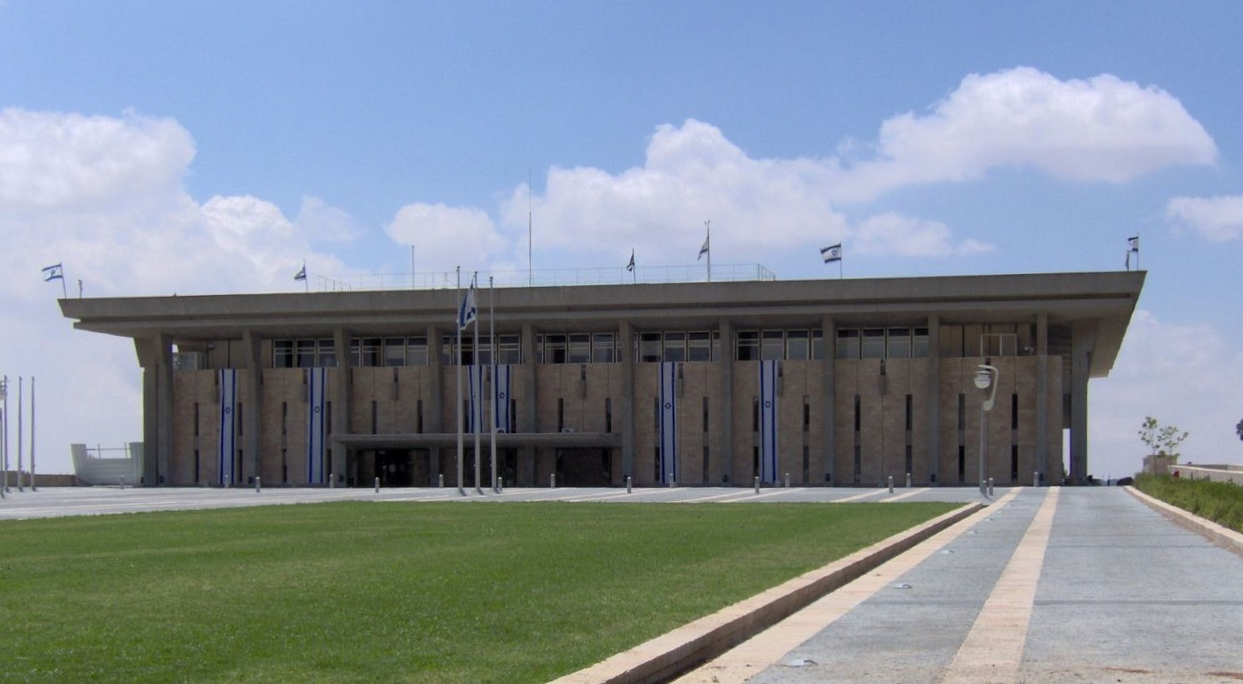
The first task of the season took place at the Knesset in Jerusalem.

Airdate: 15 July 2019

- Jerusalem, Israel (Wohl Rose Park Helipad) (Starting Line)
- Jerusalem (Knesset)
- Jerusalem (Rothschild Street)
- Netzer Sereni (Kibbutz Farm)
- Tel Aviv (Habima Square)
- Tel Aviv (Eretz Israel Museum)

Additional tasks

- At the Knesset, teams had to enter Chagall State Hall and study ten photographs of significant events that occurred at the legislature and the date associated with each photograph. When ready, teams would be taken in a boom lift to a wooden beam suspended over Rothschild Street that they had to climb up 30 metres (98 ft) by inserting metal pegs into holes. After reaching the top, teams had to place the ten photographs with their correct dates to receive their next clue.
- After team completed the first task, they had to find a marked Škoda Kodiaq or Škoda Karoq parked on Rothschild Street with a driver that would take teams to their next destination.
- At Netzer Sereni, teams had to use poles to push a basket of citrus fruit up an angled beam without letting the fruit fall until the basket locks in place at the top to receive their next clue.
- At Habima Square, teams had to find a person with physical proof that they were departing on a flight from Ben Gurion Airport within the next 24 hours and bring that person, who would receive a US$200 JR/Duty Free gift card, to Habima Square to receive their next clue.

=== Leg 2 (Israel → South Africa) ===
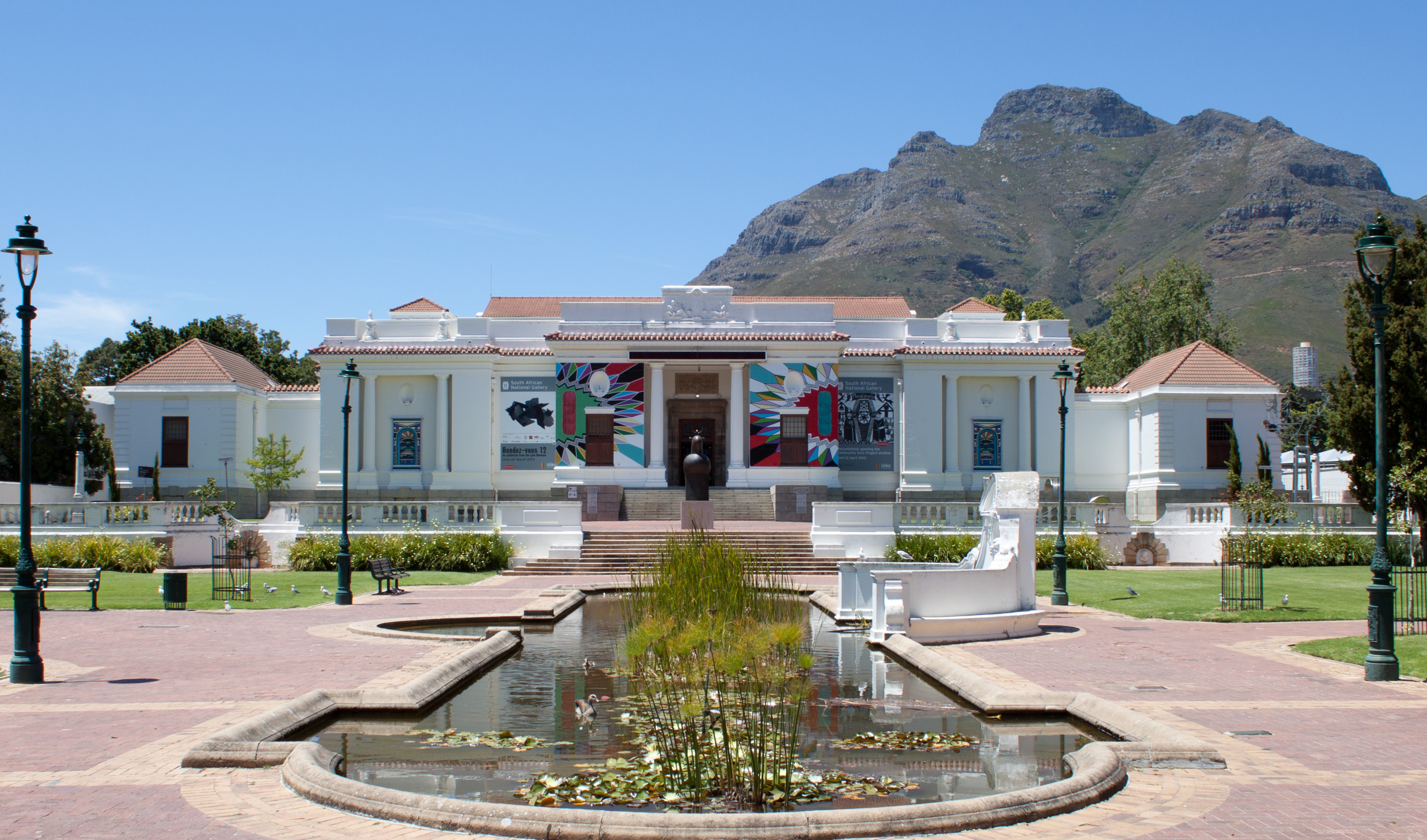
Teams concluded their first leg in Cape Town at the Iziko South African National Gallery.

Airdates: 17 & 20 July 2019

- Tel Aviv (Ben Gurion Airport) to Cape Town, South Africa (Cape Town International Airport)
- Cape Town (Bo-Kaap – Atlas Trading Company)
- Cape Town (Port of Cape Town)
- Cape Town (Victoria & Alfred Waterfront – Victoria Wharf Shopping Centre)
- Cape Town (Netcare Christiaan Barnard Memorial Hospital)
- Cape Town (Hout Bay Harbour)
- Cape Town (Company's Garden – Artillery Memorial)
- Cape Town (Iziko South African National Gallery)

In this season's first Roadblock, one team member had to don a virtual reality headset and watch footage of animals crawling on themselves for 30 minutes. In reality, the animals were crawling on a mannequin, and hospital staff were using props to make team members believe that the animals were on them. Team members would be attached to a pulse oximeter, and if their pulse exceeded 90 beats per minute, the 30-minute clock would stop until team members could lower their pulse. Once the time expired, teams would receive their next clue. Before leaving the hospital, teams would discover if they had been Yielded.

Additional tasks

- At Atlas Trading Company, teams had to transport a hand truck loaded with bags of spices through the streets of Bo-Kaap and deliver the bags to three houses with the same numbers printed on the bags' tags and the same color as the bags. While transporting the bags, each team member had to hold a tray with three bowls of spices. If they brought the bags to the correct houses, teams would receive receipts that they had to bring back to Atlas Trading Company in exchange for their next clue.
- At the quays in the Port of Cape Town, teams would vote for the team they wish to Yield. They would then discover an Intersection and had to agree to work with another team. The newly Intersected teams had to stand on a rotating platform above Table Bay. Each team member had to walk across a narrow beam from one pillar of the platform to the next one. Then, all of the team members would open a box that would reveal a number. Finally, one team member had to climb down a rope to a box with a combination lock and had to unlock their next clues by combining the four numbers (2357). If a team member fell off the platform or if teams' time limit of 10 minutes expired, they would have to perform the task again. After completing the task, teams were no longer Intersected.
- At Victoria Wharf Shopping Centre, teams had to encourage twenty-four passersby to place puzzle pieces on their heads. Teams then had to properly arrange their volunteers so that the pieces formed an image of South African President Nelson Mandela to receive their next clue.
- At Hout Bay Harbour, teams had to clean and then shuck oysters until they found a pearl to receive their next clue directing them to the Pit Stop, where the Yielded teams would have to wait out a 15-minute penalty.

=== Leg 3 (South Africa) ===
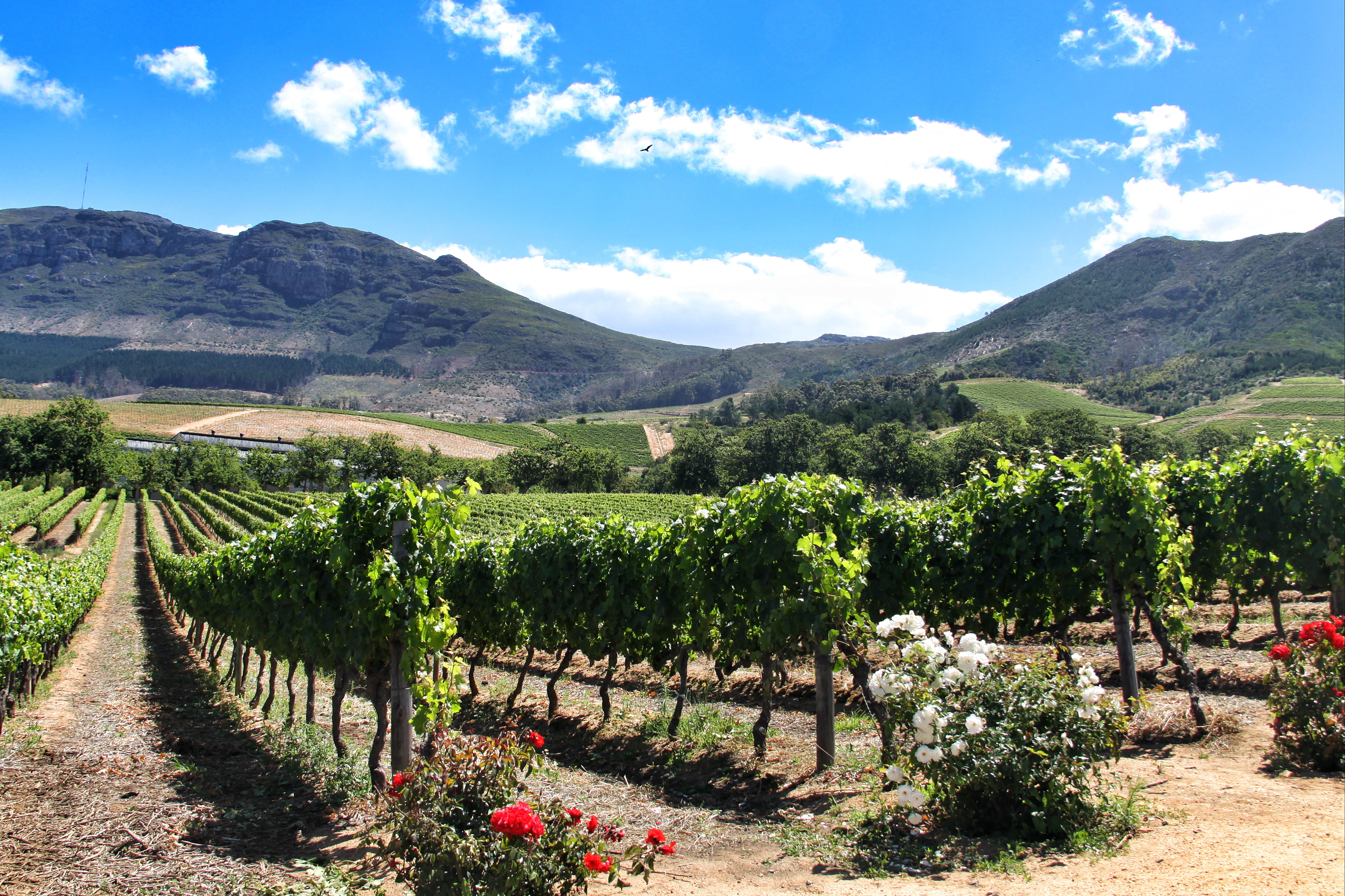
Teams began the third leg by rolling a leaky wine barrel through Groot Constantia, the oldest wine estate in South Africa.

Airdates: 22, 24 & 27 July 2019

- Cape Town (Radisson Red) (Pit Start)
- Cape Town (Constantia – Groot Constantia)
- Cape Town (Green Point – Cape Town Stadium)
- Cape Town (Camps Bay Beach)
- Cape Town (Mouille Point – Sea Point Promenade)
- Cape Town (Mouille Point – Green Point Lighthouse)
- Cape Town (Castle of Good Hope)
- Cape Town (Kraaifontein Integrated Waste Management Facility)
- Cape Town (Victoria & Alfred Waterfront – Quay 5)

For this season's first Duel, teams had to dress as penguins and then one member from each team would face off in a square. The first team member that pushed their opponent would win a round, and the first team to win two rounds would receive their next clue, while the losing team had to wait for another team. The team that lost the final Duel had to wait out a 15-minute penalty.

Additional tasks

- At Groot Constantia, teams had to roll a leaky barrel full of wine through the vineyard and past a few obstacles. At the other end of the vineyard, teams had to fill wine bottles with the remaining wine. When teams filled 25 bottles, they would receive their next clue. Before leaving the wine estate, teams would vote for the team they wished to Yield.
- At Cape Town Stadium, teams had to navigate a ball up a board filled with holes using ropes attached to their knees, which were secured with a brace, until they could drop the ball into the goal at the top to receive their next clue.
- At Sea Point Promenade, teams would discover if they had been Yielded.
- At Green Point Lighthouse, one team member would be strapped to a spinning propeller and had to drop produce, placed into their mouth by their partner, into a basket that lists the Afrikaans name, written in Hebrew, for the produce. After dropping eight pieces of produce into the appropriate baskets, teams would receive their next clue.
- At the Castle of Good Hope, team members would be secured to each other with a ball and chain and had to use a map to find the one key they could use to free themselves to receive their next clue. Teams could only carry the balls when walking on stairs.
- At Kraaifontein Integrated Waste Management Facility, teams had to search through the trash on a conveyor belt for one piece of trash marked with an Amazing Race flag. Teams had to properly sort any recyclable items they picked up. Once teams found the correct piece of trash, they could exchange it for their next clue directing them to the Pit Stop, where the Yielded team would have to wait out a 15-minute penalty.

=== Leg 4 (South Africa → Zambia) ===
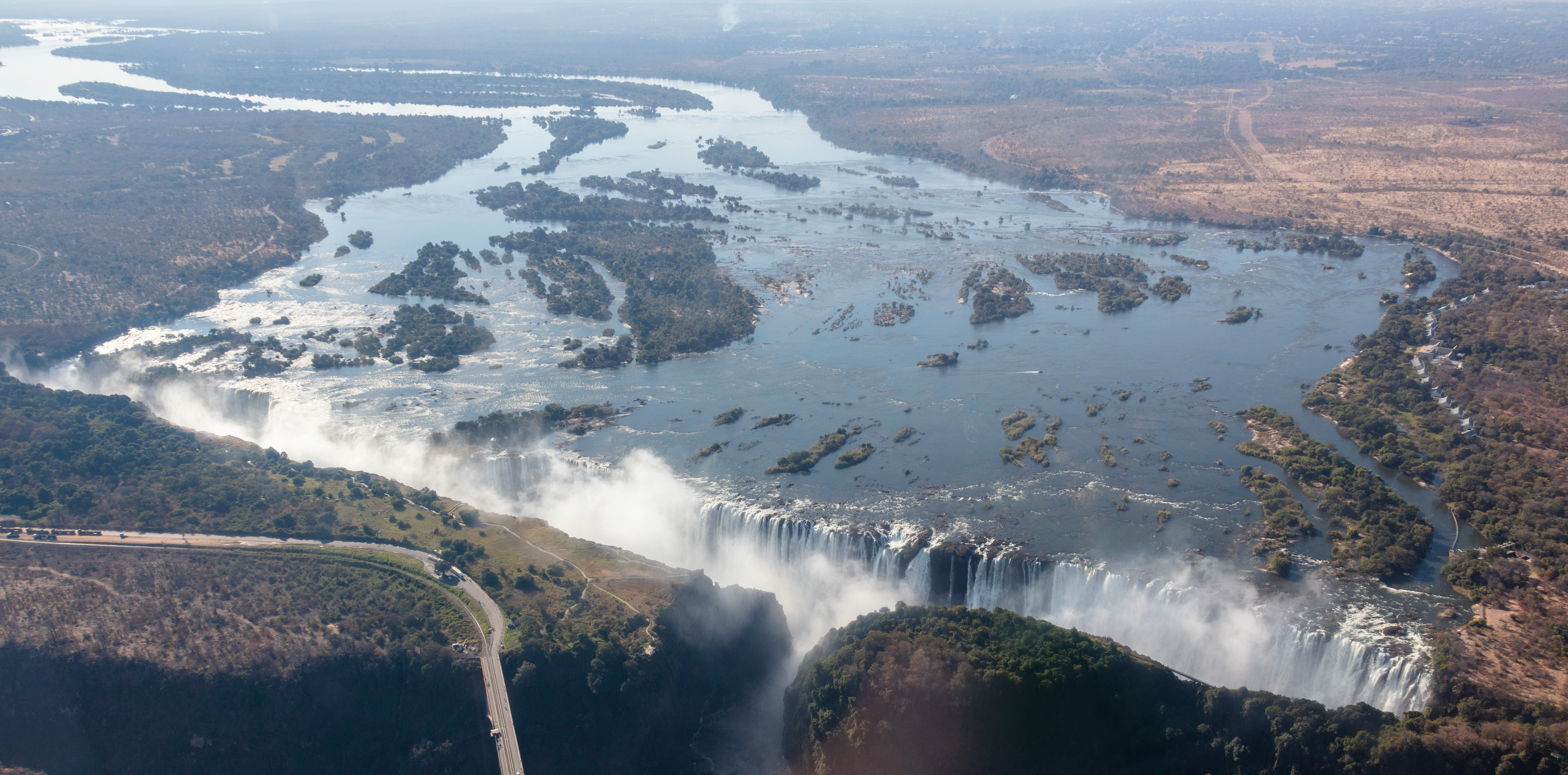
After arriving in Livingstone, Zambia, team members flew over Victoria Falls in a microlight.

Airdates: 31 July & 3 August 2019

- Cape Town (Cape Town International Airport) to Livingstone, Zambia (Harry Mwanga Nkumbula International Airport)
- Livingstone (Batoka Sky Aerodrome)
- Livingstone (Batoka House)
- Livingstone (Livingstone Reptile Park)
- Livingstone District (Chundu House)
- Livingstone District (Simoonga Village)
- Livingstone District (Nona Lodge)
- Livingstone District (Kubu Zambezi Campsite)
- Mosi-oa-Tunya National Park (Zambia–Zimbabwe Border Crossing)

For this leg's Duel, each team would be suspended in a net much like a silkworm in a chrysalis and had to use a saw attached to a pole to cut the ten ropes near their net. The first team to cut the correct rope holding them up, drop to the ground, and emerge as butterflies would receive their next clue, while the losing team had to wait for another team. Teams also had to be careful as one of their own ropes would drop their opponents. The team that lost the final Duel had to wait out a 15-minute penalty.

Additional tasks

- At Batoka Sky Aerodrome, one team member would board a microlight and would be taken on a flight above Victoria Falls. They would be in communication with their partner via a two-way radio and had to describe what they saw to their partner, who had to fill in a map of the Zambia-Zimbabwe border along the Zambezi River with the missing landmarks to receive their next clue. If the map was incorrect after the flight was complete, teams would have to wait 15 minutes while the microlight was refueled before they could attempt the task again.
- Outside Batoka House, teams would vote for the team they wished to Yield.
- At Livingstone Reptile Park, teams had to feed Nile crocodiles meat that they tied onto a pole with an attached magnet. Using the magnet, teams had to collect fifteen images of crocodiles, five of each color from three enclosures, to receive their next clue.
- At Simoonga Village, teams had to pick up a solar panel and carry it to a work station. There, they had to connect the solar panel to a radio and tune it to the correct frequency to hear their next clue.
- At Nona Lodge, one team member had to study a list of diseases and their local treatment. Their partner would choose a disease, and the team member that studied the list had to direct a doctor to perform the corresponding treatment for their partner. If the team member was given the correct treatment, teams would receive their next clue. If the treatment was incorrect or if the sick contestant asked for the treatment to stop, they would have to attempt the task again. Before leaving Nona Lodge, teams would discover if they had been Yielded.
- At Kubu Zambezi Campsite, teams would find stone towers like the Epworth balancing rocks found on Zimbabwean dollar banknotes. They had to deconstruct the towers until they found a $100 trillion banknote underneath one; however, teams had to reconstruct any tower they looked under. When teams found the banknote, they could exchange it for their next clue directing them to the Pit Stop, where the Yielded team would have to wait out a 15-minute penalty.

=== Leg 5 (Zambia → Zimbabwe) ===
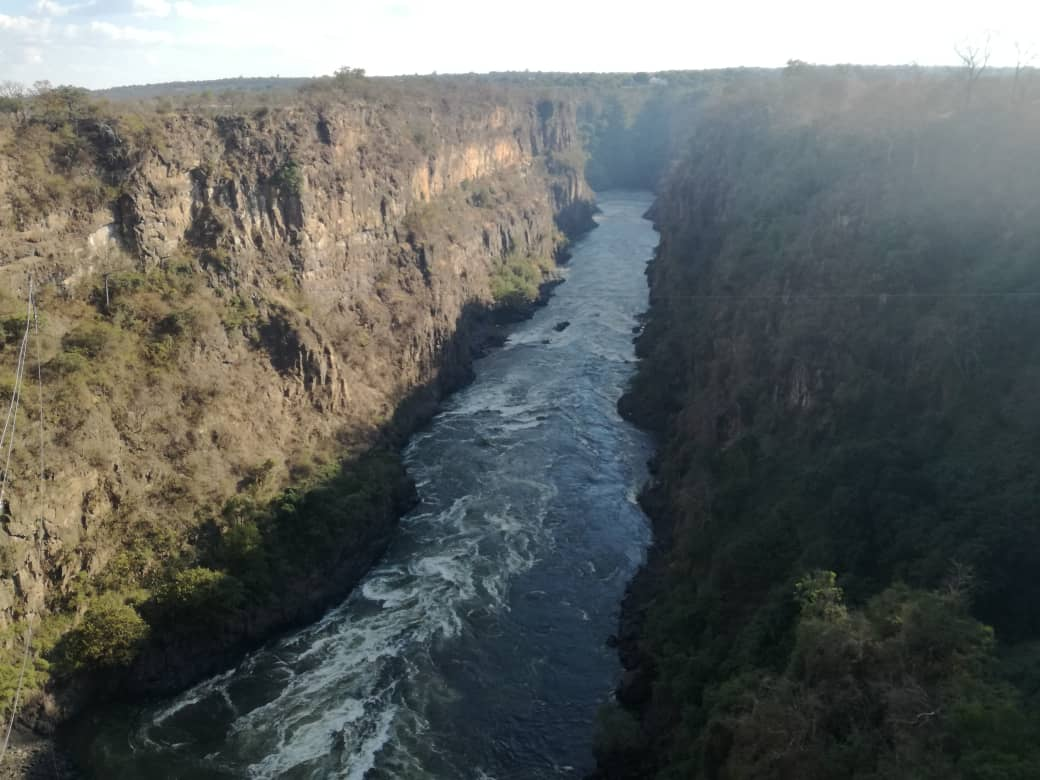
For the Roadblock in Victoria Falls, Zimbabwe, team members had to swing into Batoka Gorge above the Zambezi.

Airdates: 4 & 7 August 2019

- Victoria Falls, Zimbabwe (The Lookout Café)
- Victoria Falls National Park (Batoka Gorge)
- Victoria Falls (Victoria Falls Railway Station)
- Victoria Falls (Shoestrings Backpackers Lodge)
- Victoria Falls (Elephant Hills Resort Golf Course)
- Victoria Falls (Monde Village)
- Victoria Falls (Mpisi Village)
- Victoria Falls (Zambezi House)

In this season's final Roadblock, one team member was harnessed to a gorge swing before free-falling 70 metres (230 ft) into the Batoka Gorge and swinging 95 metres (312 ft) across the Zambezi before receiving their next clue after returning atop the ledge.

For this leg's Duel, each team had to stand atop a beam above a pool. One team member had to transfer six balls to baskets so that the combined colors of the balls would form the color of the basket, while their partner swung large bags to knock their opponents into the water. The first team to get all of their balls in the appropriate baskets would receive their next clue, while the losing team had to wait for another team. The team that lost the final Duel had to wait out a 15-minute penalty.

Additional tasks

- At Victoria Falls Railway Station, teams had to become porters by watching a video on a tablet computer of a family describing their belongings, which teams had to stack onto a cart and then load them onto a train's goods wagon to receive their next clue. Before they left the rail yard, teams would vote for the team they wished to Yield. Teams could then make fruit smoothies at the fruit stand from sponsor ספרינג (Spring).
- At Elephant Hills Resort Golf Course, one team member had to pull a rope attached to a platform that their partner was sitting on. The dizzy team member then had to throw a spear at animal statues and hit the four invertebrates, a beetle, a snail, a butterfly, and a spider, to receive their next clue.
- At Monde Village, each team member had to fill a bucket, bowl, or pitcher with water from a well and then carry the item full of water on their heads to a hut, where teams had to transfer the water to a pot. Once the pot was filled to a line, teams would receive their next clue.
- At Mpisi Village, teams would discover if they had been Yielded. Then, one team member would enter a tub while their partner scrubbed them with a bar of soap. Teams had to keep scrubbing until they found a Zimbabwe Bird soapstone carving inside one of the five bars of soap that they could exchange for their next clue directing them to the Pit Stop, where the Yielded team would have to wait out a 15-minute penalty.

=== Leg 6 (Zimbabwe → Mauritius) ===
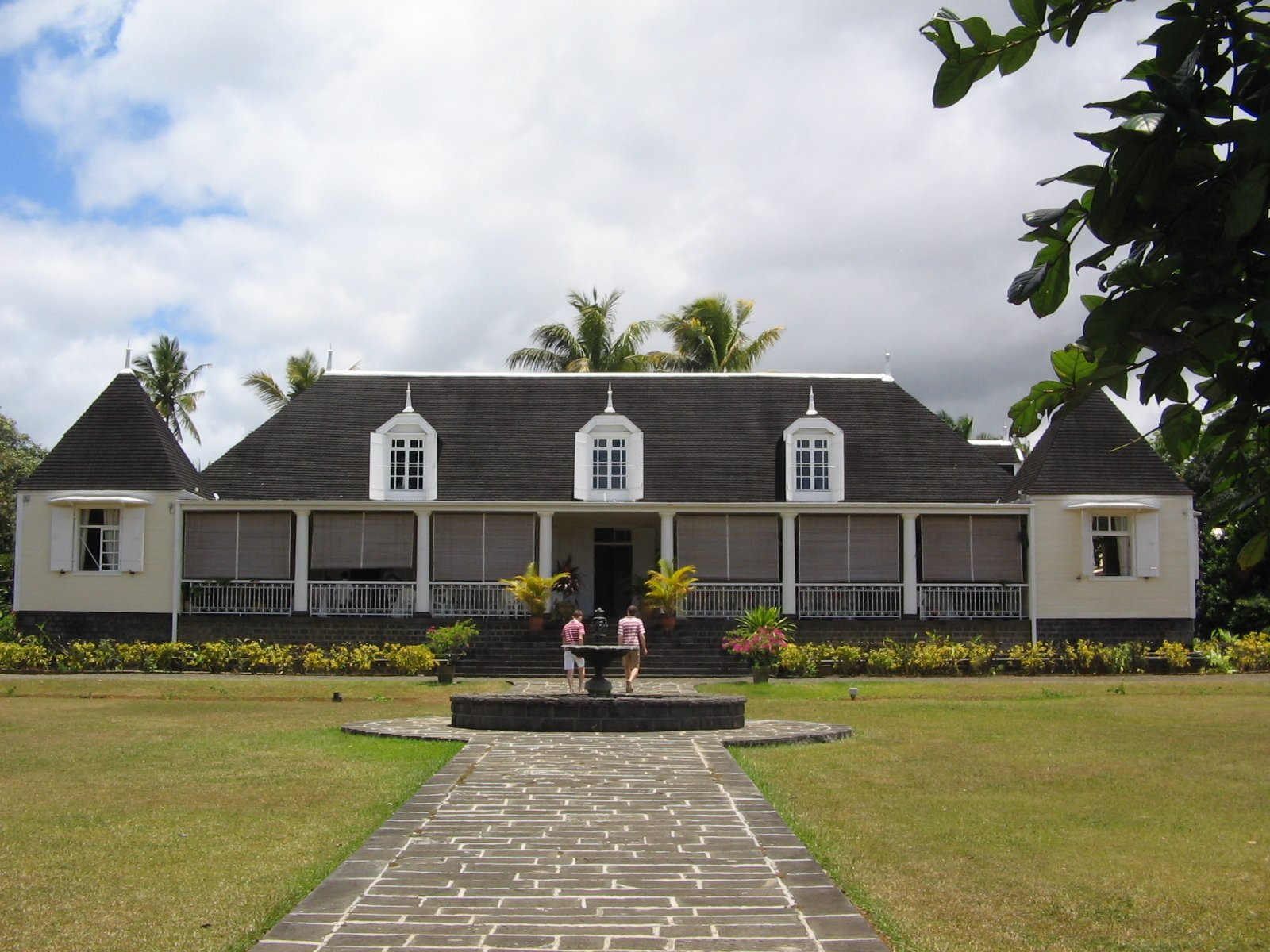
Teams' first leg in Mauritius concluded at the Saint Aubin House, a 200 year old sugar plantation.

Airdates: 14 & 17 August 2019

- Livingstone, Zambia (Harry Mwanga Nkumbula International Airport) to Plaine Magnien, Mauritius (Sir Seewoosagur Ramgoolam International Airport)
- Pointe d'Esny (Pointe d'Esny Beach)
- Pointe d'Esny (Club Nautique de Pointe d'Esny)
- Riambel (Riambel Beach)
- Rivière-des-Anguilles (La Vanille Nature Park (in French))
- Vacoas-Phoenix (J&J Auditorium)
- Rivière des Anguilles (Bel Air Sugarcane Field)
- L'Escalier (La Baraque Sugarcane Mill)
- Saint Aubin (Saint Aubin House)

This season's first Detour was a choice between דודו (Dodo) or צב (Turtle). In Dodo, each team member had to don a dodo costume. Then, one team member had to pick up an egg with their beak and transfer the egg to their partner's beak without touching the egg. That person had to deposit the egg in a nest, and after depositing two eggs, teams would receive their next clue. In Turtle, teams had to don an Aldabra giant tortoise costume with one team member on top of their partner, who was blindfolded and serving as the legs, serving as the eyes of their blindfolded partner. Working together, teams had to gather two stems of leaves from a stand and place them in a basket to receive their next clue.

Additional tasks

- At Pointe d'Esny Beach, each team member would be towed on a tube behind a boat. Once the boat was up to speed, team members had to grab four pairs of colored velcro stripes that when combined would form the flag of Mauritius to receive their next clue. Teams then had to make their way to Club Nautique de Pointe d'Esny vote for the team they wished to U-Turn.
- At Riambel Beach, one team member would be blindfolded and had to work with their partner to pick bottles of water by the neck using two sticks. If teams dropped the bottle, they had to return to the start and refill the bottle with water from the Indian Ocean. At the end of the beach, teams had to fill a cylinder with their water and retrieve a disc that they could exchange for their next clue. Before leaving Riambel Beach, teams could make fruit smoothies at the fruit stand from sponsor ספרינג (Spring).
- At J&J Auditorium, one team member had to watch a dance performance and teach it to their partner, who then had to correctly perform it on a stage to receive their next clue.
- In the sugarcane field, one team member had to cover themselves with syrup and then sugar before searching the field for a bucket that they had to fill with their sugar to receive their next clue.
- At La Baraque Sugarcane Mill, teams had to search an immense pile of sugarcane for one marked with an Amazing Race flag to receive their next clue.

=== Leg 7 (Mauritius) ===
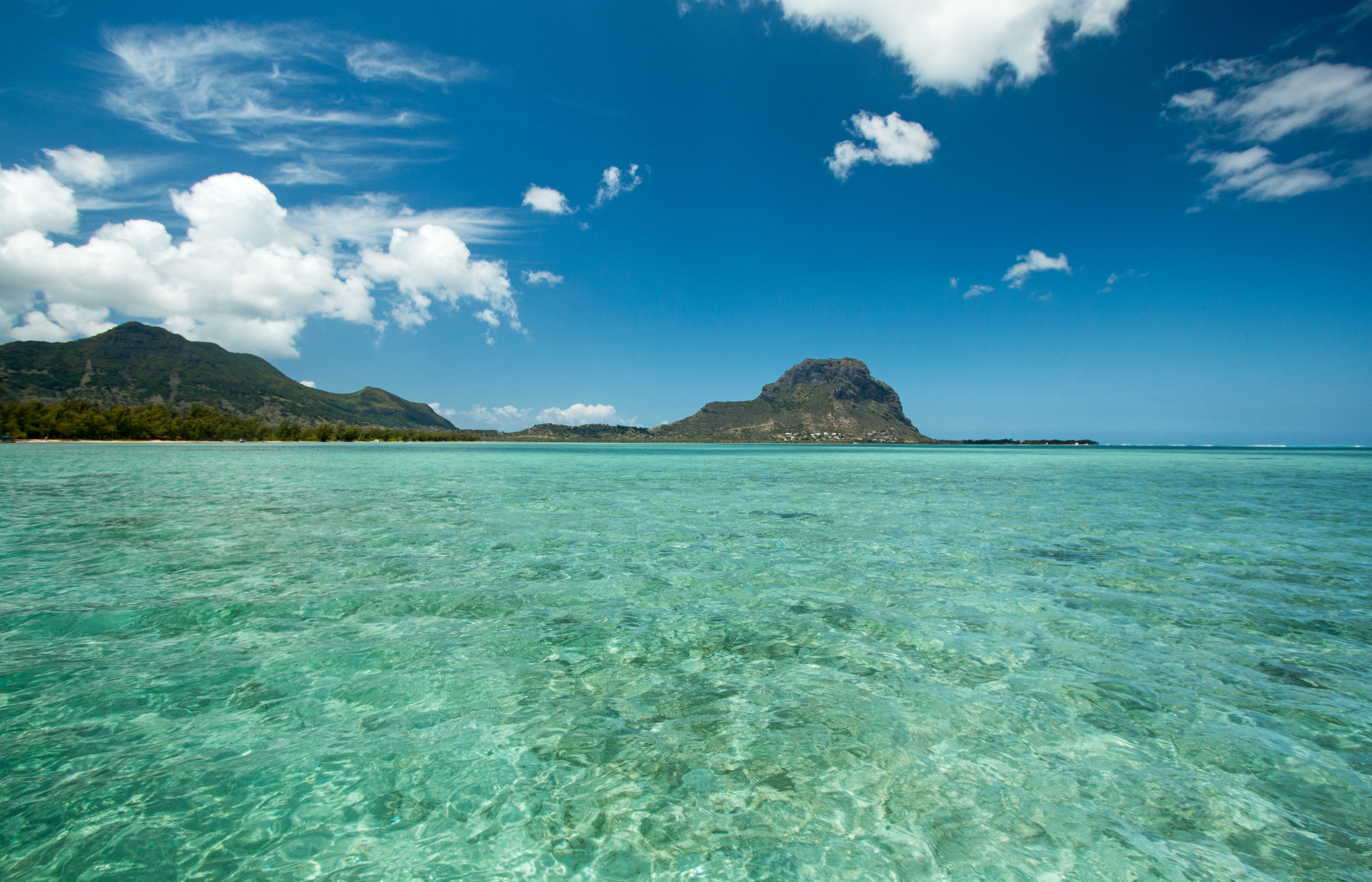
For their second leg in Mauritius, teams had to swim off the coast of Le Morne Brabant to find a key to a treasure chest.

Airdates: 21 & 24 August 2019

- Le Morne (Le Morne Beach)
- Mare Longue (Jet Ranch)
- Bel Ombre (Outrigger Mauritius Beach Resort)
- Mahébourg (Mahébourg Market)
- Vacoas-Phoenix (Mesnil Post Office)
- Grand Bassin (Ganga Talao)

For this leg's Duel, one member from each team had to fill a plate with food from a buffet. The partner of the team member with the heavier plate would have ten minutes to eat all of the food to win a round, otherwise their opponents would win the round. The team that won two rounds would receive their next clue, while the losing team had to wait for another team. The team that lost the final Duel had to wait out a 15-minute penalty.

Additional tasks

- At Le Morne Beach, teams had to dig up a treasure chest that had an image of the key needed to unlock the chest. Teams then had to swim out to a collection of jars with keys in the Indian Ocean and find the one jar that contained the key that would unlock the chest and their next clue. Before leaving Le Morne Beach, teams would vote for the team they wished to Yield.
- At Jet Ranch, teams had to unscramble Hebrew lettered tiles to spell a Mauritian landmark. When they had a guess, one team member had to climb to the top of a pole and hop from pole to pole to reach a board, where they had to use their tiles to spell their guess. When teams had the correct answer of שוק הירקות (Vegetable Market), they would receive their next clue.
- At Mahébourg Market, one team member had to place a wooden disc around their head while their partner stacked 180 tomatoes one the board and deliver them to a vendor to receive their next clue.
- Outside the Mesnil Post Office, teams would discover if they had been Yielded. Then, teams had choose bundles of letters that they had to sort into mailboxes with the letters' destinations until they found one that had an address not listed on any of the mailboxes and contained a card with the location of the Pit Stop, where the Yielded team would have to wait out a 15-minute penalty.

=== Leg 8 (Mauritius → Nepal) ===
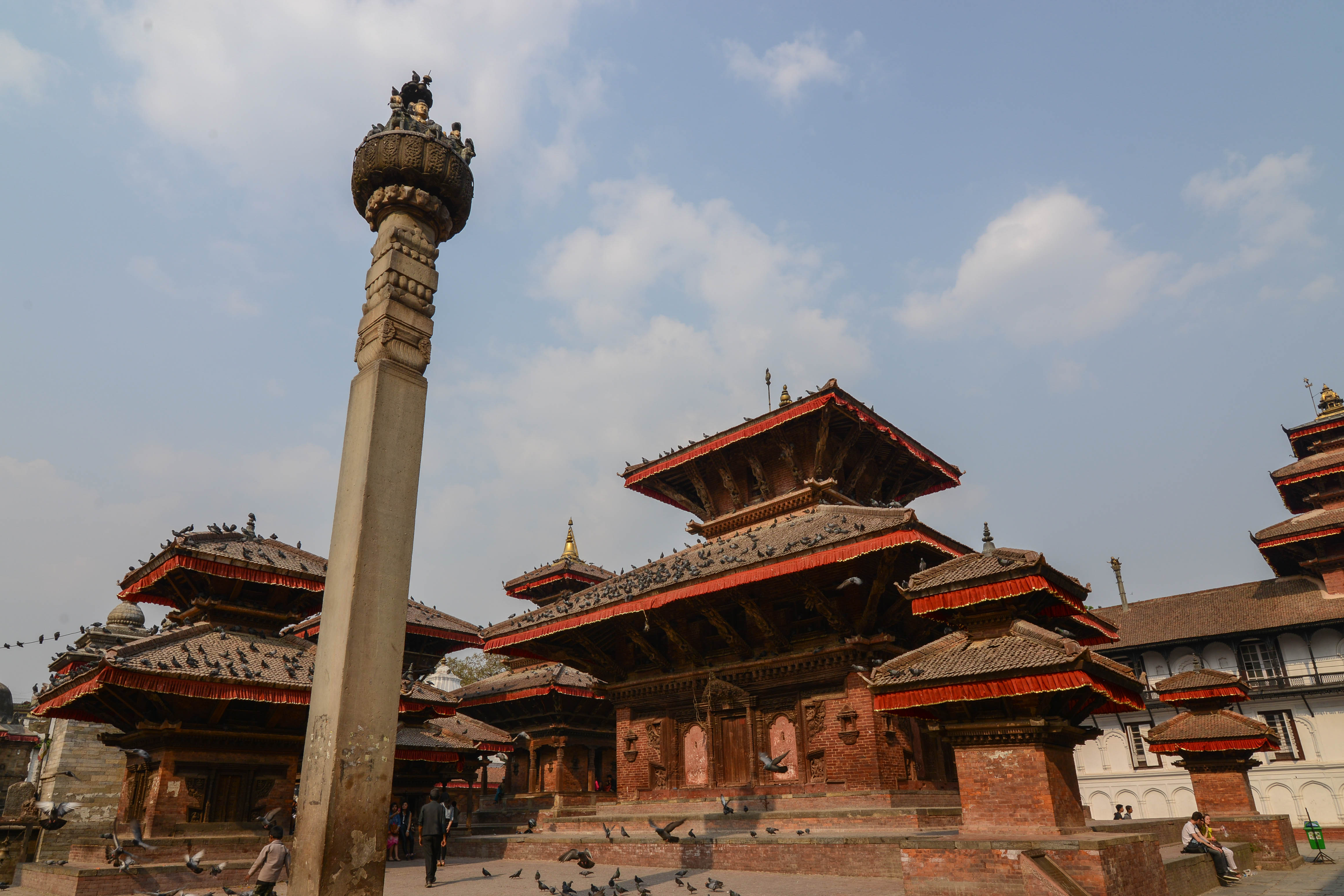
Kathmandu Durbar Square, a centuries-old square in the heart of Kathmandu, was the site of the eight Pit Stop.

Airdates: 31 August & 1 September 2019

- Plaine Magnien (Sir Seewoosagur Ramgoolam International Airport) to Kathmandu, Nepal (Tribhuvan International Airport)
- Kathmandu (Crowne Plaza Kathmandu-Soaltee) (Overnight Rest)
- Kathmandu (Ratna Park)
- Kathmandu (Swayambhunath)
- Kathmandu (Marmot Store)
- Kathmandu (Chabad House)
- Kathmandu (Royal Nepal Golf Club)
- Kathmandu (Kailash Hill)
- Kathmandu (Kathmandu Durbar Square – Gaddi Baithak)
- Kathmandu (Kathmandu Durbar Square – Hanuman Dhoka)

Additional tasks

- At Ratna Park, one team members had to identify the ten ingredients in a lassi and toss them to their partner. Once the correct ingredients were caught, teams would receive their next clue. Before leaving the park, teams voted for the team they wished to Yield.
- At Swayambhunath, teams had to carry puzzle pieces up 421 steps to the stupa, where they had to assemble the pieces to form the flag of Nepal to receive their next clue. Before leaving, teams could eat Nature Valley granola bars.
- At the Marmot Store, teams had to pick up rock-climbing equipment and carry them throughout the city much like the Sherpas on Mount Everest. They then had to convince a tourist to walk with them to Chabad House and teach them the answers to a list of questions about common aspects of Israel. After arriving, the tourist would be quizzed in Hebrew by Rabbi Chezki Lifshitz in a game called אחי ישראלי (Israeli Brother), and if seven questions were answered correctly, teams would receive their next clue. If the tourist answered any question incorrectly, teams had to find another tourist.
- At Royal Nepal Golf Club, one team member had to wrap up their partner with cloth by rolling them down a hill. Then, they had to fully dye the cloth using a traditional vegetable dye before unrolling their partner to receive their next clue. Before leaving the golf course, teams would discover if they had been Yielded.
- At Kailash Hill, teams had to remove lokta paper from one of several drying racks and use a black light to find the location of the next Pit Stop, where the Yielded team would have to wait out a 15-minute penalty, written in invisible ink. Teams had to remake any paper they removed before making another choice.

=== Leg 9 (Nepal) ===
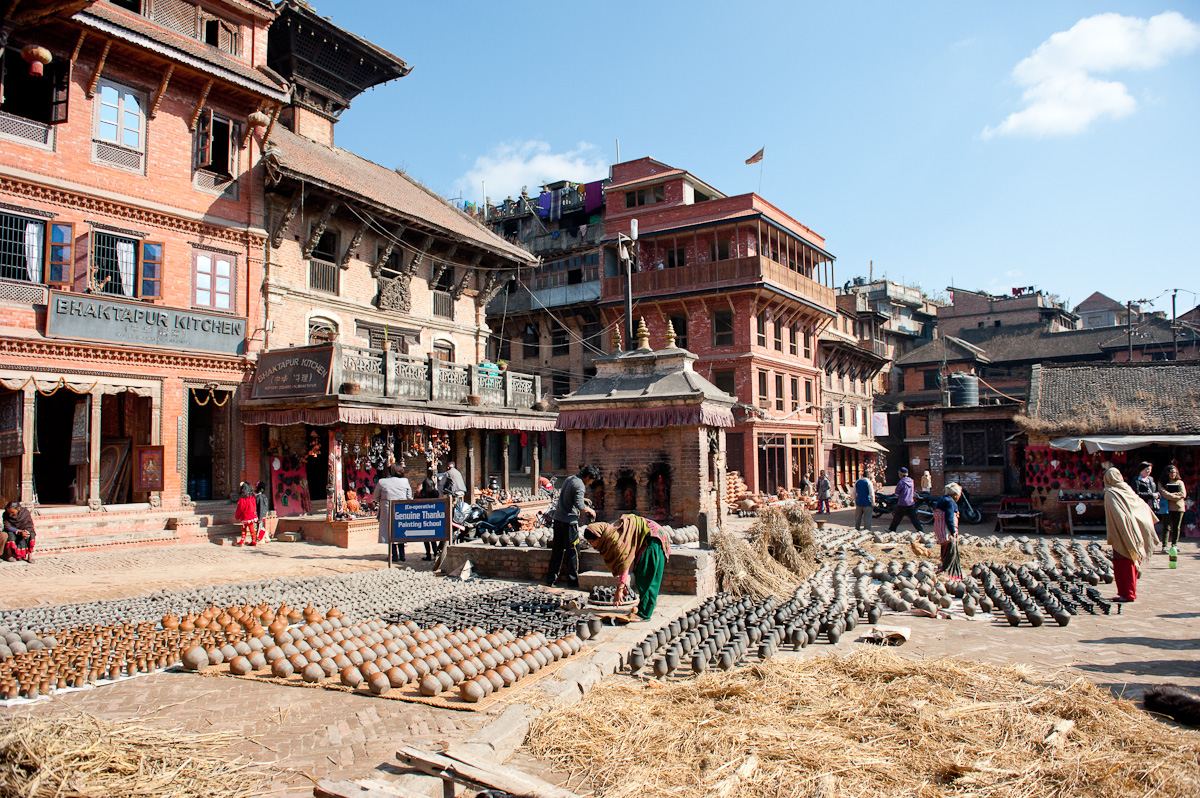
At Pottery Square in Bhaktapur, Nepal, teams had to search for a pot containing exactly 50 coins.

Airdates: 4 & 7 September 2019

- Kathmandu (Crowne Plaza Kathmandu-Soaltee) (Pit Start)
- Gokarneshwor (Kanti Bhairab Temple)
- Gokarneshwor (Drikung Kagyu Rinchen Ling Monastery)
- Mulpani (Mulpani Cricket Stadium)
- Mulpani (Grand Norling Resort)
- Bhaktapur (Stone Breaking Site)
- Bhaktapur (Pottery Square)
- Kathmandu (Amideva Buddha Park)

For this leg's Duel, teams had to push a bicycle carrying offerings of food past several obstacles with one member of each team wearing a mask of a Hindu deity. At the start of the course, the team member without the mask would learn which offering belonged to which deity and fill the glasses beneath four deities at the end of the course with the correct offerings up to the line. The first team to fill all four glasses with the correct offerings would receive their next clue, while the losing team had to wait for another team. The team that lost the final Duel had to wait out a 15-minute penalty.

This season's final Detour was a choice between להכות (Hit) or לזהות (Identify). In Hit, one team member would be attached to a harness and swung by their partner to strike a gong. Once the gong registered a sound between 86 and 93 decibels, teams would receive their next clue. In Identify, one team member would don headphones while their partner listened to one of seven gongs. After hearing the gong, they had to recreate the sound to their partner, who then had to identify which gong was struck to receive their next clue.

Additional tasks

- Outside the Crowne Plaza Kathmandu-Soaltee, teams would find a provided vehicle that would take them to Kanti Bhairab Temple, where in an adjacent field one team member had to enter a pool of mustard oil and collect mustard seed grains using a basket. Their partner had to use a bamboo pole with a hook to retrieve the basket and transfer the grains to a larger basket. Once the grains reached a marked line, teams would receive their next clue. Before leaving, teams would vote for the team they wished to Yield and could eat Nature Valley granola bars.
- At Drikung Kagyu Rinchen Ling Monastery, one team member had to retrieve seven components of a first aid kit from covered bins filled with ice water while their partner lied in an ice bath with the list of needed items. Once the kit was assembled, it would be attached to a bunch of balloons and sent up to "climbers stuck on Mount Everest", and teams would receive their next clue.
- At the stone breaking site, one team member had to hold up a basket of heavy stones on a pulley while their partner transferred stones from a pile to a scale. If the basket touched the ground, teams had to stop. Once the combined weight of both team members in stones was transferred to the scale, teams would receive their next clue. Inside a nearby store, teams would discover if they had been Yielded.
- At Pottery Square, teams had to search amongst 120 pots for one with exactly 50 coins, the interior of which was painted gold. If the pot wasn't golden inside, teams had to deposit all of the coins into a larger pot before making another choice. Once they found the correct pot, they could exchange it for their next clue directing them to the Pit Stop, where the Yielded team would have to wait out a 15-minute penalty.

=== Leg 10 (Nepal → China) ===
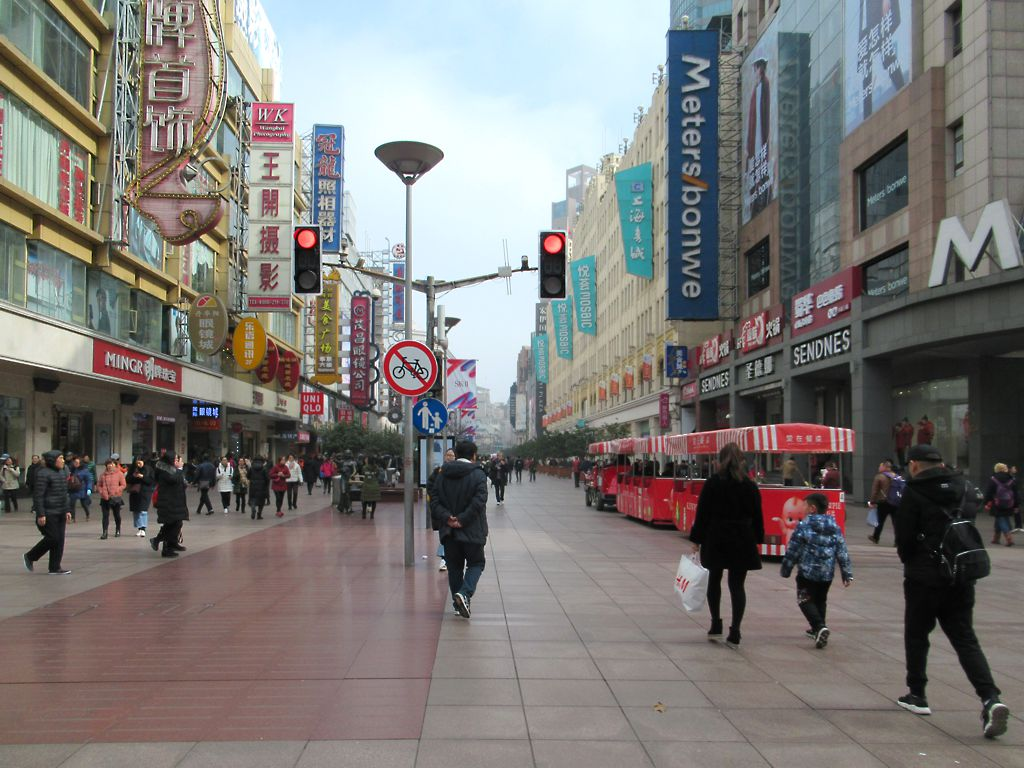
After arriving in Shanghai, team members had to propose to locals on Nanjing Road.

Airdates: 8 & 11 September 2019

- Kathmandu (Crowne Plaza Kathmandu-Soaltee) (Pit Start)
- Kathmandu (Tribhuvan International Airport) to Shanghai, China (Shanghai Pudong International Airport)
- Shanghai (Nanjing Road)
- Shanghai (Shanghai Fashion Store)
- Shanghai (Shanghai University)
- Shanghai (Airpark)
- Shanghai (Z-Cherry Theater)
- Shanghai (Doya Studio)
- Shanghai (Candy Store)
- Shanghai (SkyBridge)

For this season's final Duel, one member of each team had to stand between two walls on pegs. Alternating turns, the other member from each team had to spin a Bingo cage to dispense a ball containing instructions of where their partner had to move their hands or feet much like the game Twister. The first team to lose two rounds by falling twice would lose the Duel and had to wait for another team, while their opponents would receive their next clue. The team that lost the final Duel had to wait out a 15-minute penalty.

Additional tasks

- On Nanjing Road, teams had to find a person that met five listed characteristics: a person with sunglasses, three credit cards, and cosmetics who was either a 1.75-metre (5.7 ft) tall man with a size 44 shoe or a 1.68-metre (5.5 ft) tall woman with a size 38 shoe. Once teams found the a person, they would receive a clue, which instructed one team member to propose to the person they found while their partner recorded the proposal on a hand-held camera to receive their next clue.
- Outside the Shanghai Fashion Store, teams would vote for the team they wished to Yield.
- At Shanghai University, one team member had to don a virtual reality headset and navigate their partner through a first-person shooter video game to receive their next clue.
- Outside the Z-Cherry Theater, teams would discover if they had been Yielded. Then, team members had to dress themselves in full Chinese opera makeup and costume and then learn a performance using a tablet computer provided by sponsor Hot. Once teams could correctly perform the routine onstage, they would receive their next clue.
- At Doya Studio, teams had to record a segment for a shopping channel. Teams would be given a box with a product that they had to explain with a one sentence hint written on the box to guide them. Once teams completed the segment, the host would tell them how many products were correctly explained. If any products were incorrectly explained, teams had to wait 10 minutes before making another attempt. Once all the products were correctly explained, teams would receive their next clue.
- Outside the candy store, one team member had to smell twelve toothpastes and describe the smell to their partner, who had to search the store for the food scent within each toothpaste to receive their next clue directing them to the Pit Stop, where the Yielded teams would have to wait out a 15-minute penalty.

=== Leg 11 (China → Philippines) ===
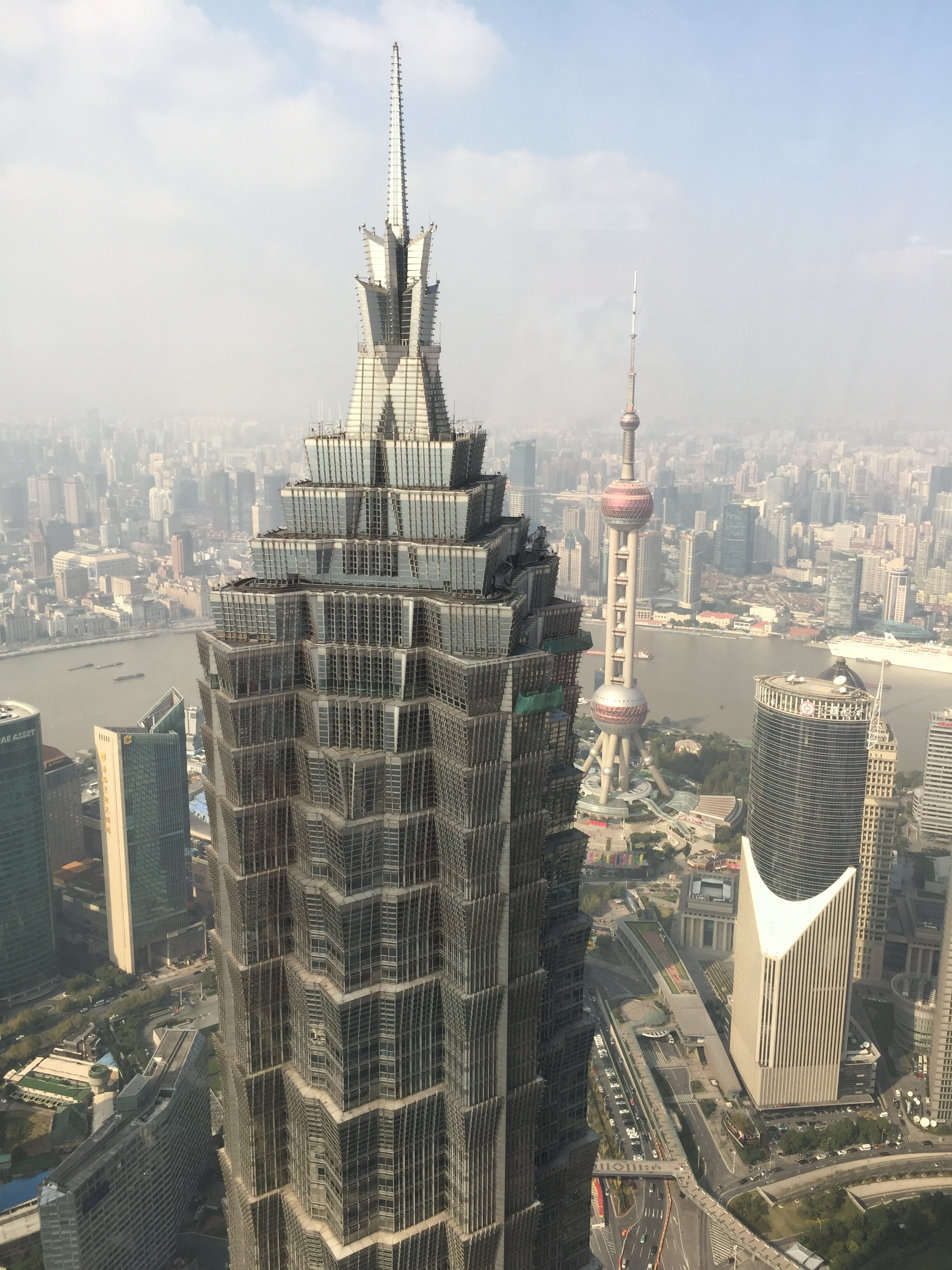
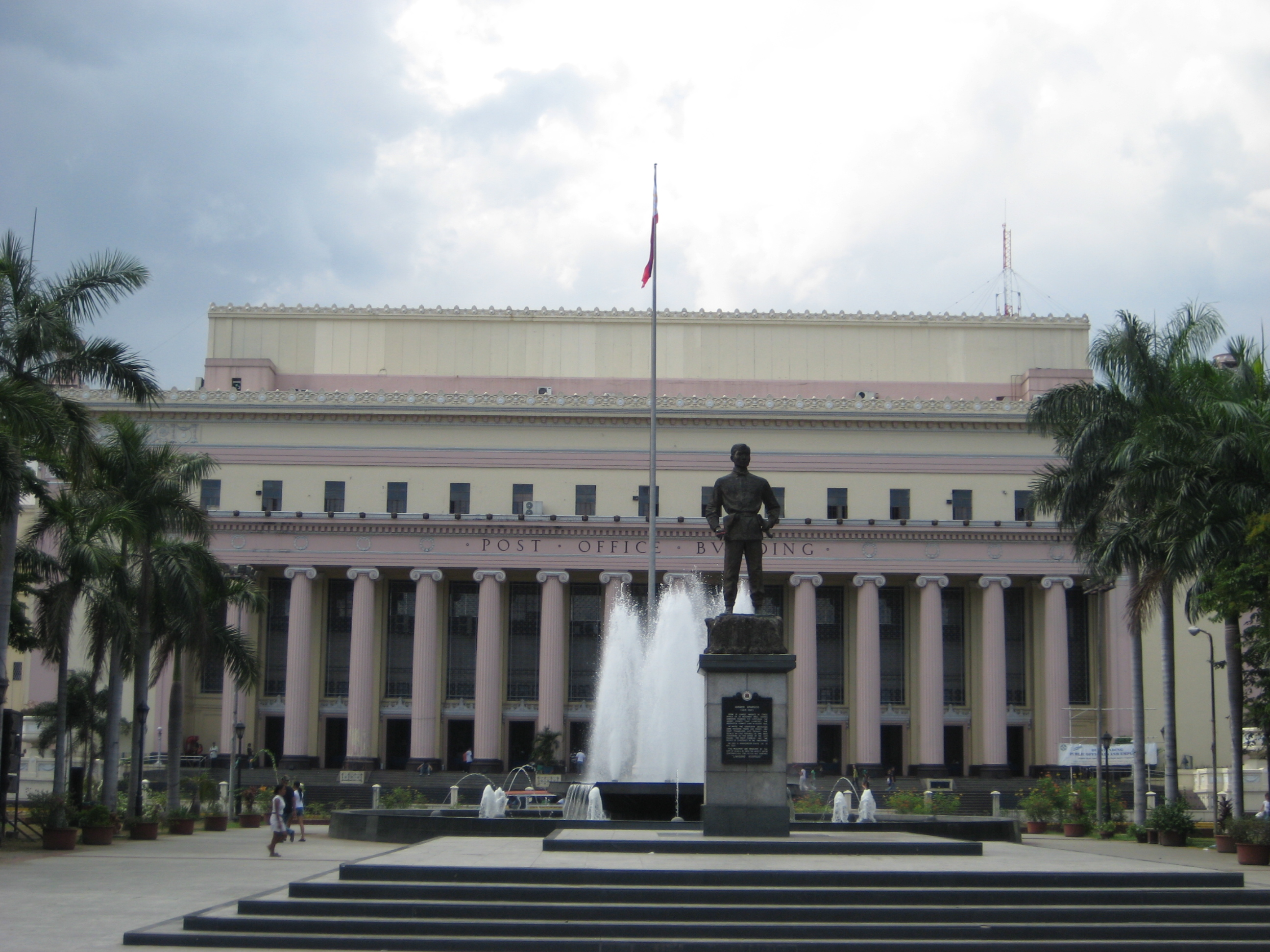
During the penultimate leg, teams walked out onto the ledge of the 88-story Jin Mao Tower before traveling to Manila and finishing at Liwasang Bonifacio near the Manila Central Post Office.

Airdates: 14, 15 & 18 September 2019

- Shanghai (Jin Mao Tower)
- Shanghai (The River Mall – Robopark)
- Shanghai (Shanghai Magic Jungle)
- Shanghai (Golden Square near Yuyuan Garden)
- Shanghai (Zhujiajiao – North Main Street Boat Quay)
- Shanghai (Zhujiajiao – Pharmacy)
- Shanghai (Zhujiajiao – Guanglaotai Stinky Tofu Restaurant)
- Shanghai (China Rush Travel Agency) (Halfway Point)
- Shanghai (Shanghai Pudong International Airport) to Manila, Philippines (Ninoy Aquino International Airport)
- Pasay (Ninoy Aquino International Airport to CCP Open Grounds)
- Pasay (Star City)
- Pasay (SM by the Bay)
- Manila (Liwasang Bonifacio overlooking Manila Central Post Office)

Additional tasks

- Atop the Jin Mao Tower, teams had to walk out onto the Skywalk, 340 metres (1,120 ft) off the ground, and have themselves photographed while recreating five extreme poses on the ledge to receive their next clue.
- At Robopark, teams had to search the store for the Zeriks robot and would discover that the robot had a tablet computer showing their loved ones. When their conversation ended, teams would receive their next clue.
- At Shanghai Magic Jungle, teams had to change into traditional Chinese clothing while in a small box within nine minutes to receive their next clue.
- At Golden Square, teams had to convince 25 passersby to eat a candy apple to receive their next clue.
- At North Main Street Boat Quay, teams would find bamboo poles that they had to transport to a traditional Chinese medicine pharmacy to receive their next clue.
- At Guanglaotai Stinky Tofu Restaurant, each team member had to create stinky tofu necklaces of twenty cubes to receive their next clue. If teams didn't want to make the necklaces, each team member had to eat a plate of sticky tofu.
- The next day at China Rush Travel Agency, teams were told that the semi-finals were not over and that they had to fly to Manila in the Philippines.
- After arriving in Manila, teams had to find a jeepney that would take them to the CCP Open Grounds, where teams would find a large cube that one team member had to stay on top of the entire time their partner rolled it through a course to receive their next clue. Before leaving, teams could make fruit smoothies at the fruit stand from sponsor ספרינג (Spring).
- At Star City, one team member had to answer a series of questions their partner had to match while riding the Star Frisbee. If team members didn't match their answers, they would have to wait out a 10-minute penalty before making another attempt. Once team members had the same answers for eight questions, they would receive their next clue.
- At SM by the Bay, one team member had to pull their partner, who had to hold two trays of ceramics, on a skateboard through a series of Amazing Race flags and past a line before making a guess as to the location of the Pit Stop from five pictures of local landmarks (Mall of Asia Arena, Manila Central Post Office, SM Mall of Asia Globe, Coconut Palace, and Cultural Center of the Philippines) with the Pit Stop at Liwasang Bonifacio outside of the post office.

=== Leg 12 (Philippines → Israel) ===
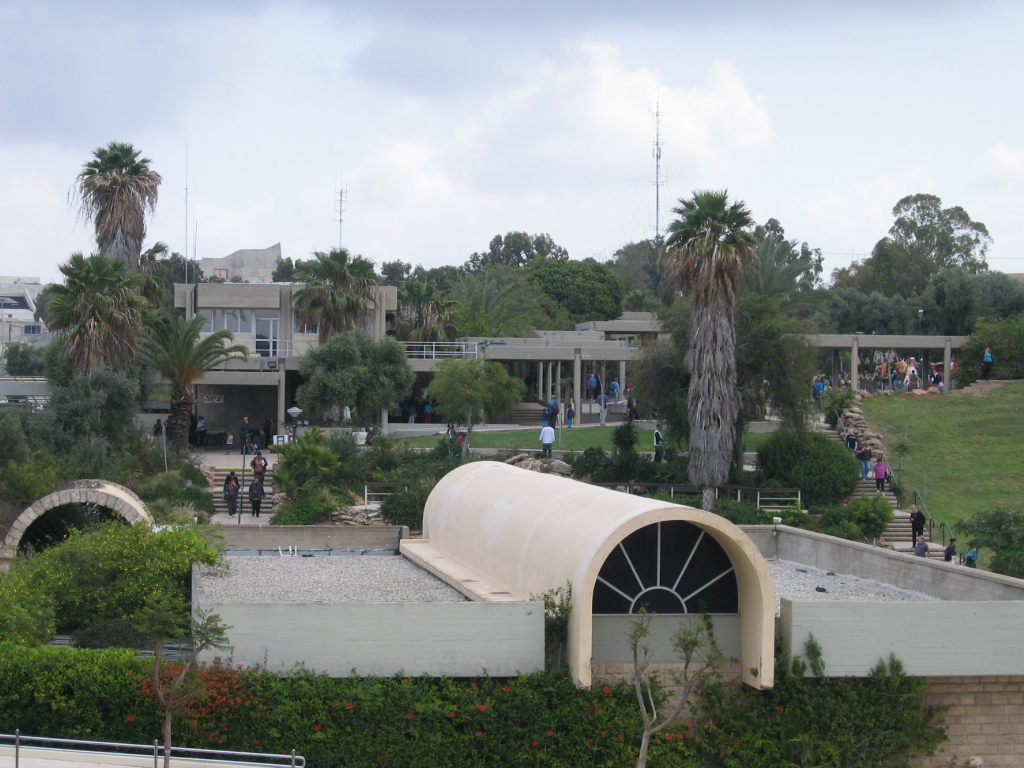
After racing through the Philippines, teams returned to Israel and finished at the Eretz Israel Museum, which also served as the first Pit Stop.

Airdate: 22 September 2019

- Manila (RealShip Yacht Pier)
- Taguig (Bonifacio High Street)
- Makati (Trump Tower Manila)
- Quezon City (Quezon Memorial Circle – Philippine-Israel Friendship Park)
- Manila (Ninoy Aquino International Airport) to Tel Aviv, Israel (Ben Gurion Airport)
- Tel Aviv (Kenshoo Tel Aviv)
- Tel Aviv (Eretz Israel Museum)

Additional tasks

- At the start of the leg, teams rode a yacht on Manila Bay before returning to the RealShip Yacht Pier, where one team member had to walk across surfboards that spanned the gap between two stacks of shipping containers to retrieve the flags of the countries they visited during the season. They would be held up by their partner, who was suspended above them on a zip line and could only collect four flags after a crossing. After returning to the start, they had to place the flags in chronological order to receive their next clue.
- At Bonifacio High Street, teams had to encourage 50 people to line up with a mattress behind each of them before falling like dominoes to receive their next clue.
- At Trump Tower Manila, teams had to use large suction cups to climb 30 floors up the facade of the third-tallest building in the Philippines to collect the two halves of their next clue.
- At Philippine-Israel Friendship Park, teams were informed that the competition had not ended and were instructed to travel to Kenshoo Tel Aviv in Tel Aviv. Teams were released from Ben Gurion Airport in the same order they arrived at Philippine-Israel Friendship Park.
- At Kenshoo Tel Aviv, teams had to open four puzzle boxes with clues to the location of the Finish Line leading them to figure out that it was located at the first Pit Stop: Eretz Israel Museum.

== Ratings ==
Data courtesy of the Israeli Rating Committee, according to individuals aged 4+ from the general population.

No.	Air date	Episode	Percentage	Nightly Rank	Ref
1	15 July 2019	"Taking Off!"	8.0%	1	
2	17 July 2019	"Welcome to Cape Town!"	6.7%	1	
3	20 July 2019	"The First Team is Eliminated"	7.8%	1	
4	22 July 2019	"Battle of the Penguins"	5.8%	3	
5	24 July 2019	"The Human Spinner"	5.5%	3	
6	27 July 2019	"The Second Team is Eliminated from the Game"	7.6%	2	
7	31 July 2019	"Landing in Zambia"	5.7%	3	
8	3 August 2019	"The Third Team is Ousted from the Game"	5.8%	3	
9	4 August 2019	"The Forbidden Bungee in Zimbabwe"	5.9%	2	
10	7 August 2019	"Elimination in Zimbabwe"	5.3%	3	
11	14 August 2019	"Landing in Mauritius"	4.7%	3	
12	17 August 2019	"Elimination in Mauritius"	6.9%	2	
13	21 August 2019	"The Buffet War"	5.3%	3	
14	24 August 2019	"Elimination in Mauritius"	6.0%	4	
15	28 August 2019	"The Secret Cameras"	<3.7%	>5	
16	31 August 2019	"Landing in Nepal"	7.3%	3	
17	1 September 2019	"Elimination in Nepal"	5.6%	3	
18	4 September 2019	"Duel in Nepal"	5.3%	3	
19	7 September 2019	"Who Will Rise to the Quarterfinals?"	5.7%	3	
20	8 September 2019	"Shanghai Quarterfinals – Part 1"	5.1%	4	
21	11 September 2019	"Shanghai Quarterfinals – Part 2"	4.8%	3	
22	14 September 2019	"The Shanghai Semifinals"	5.6%	4	
23	15 September 2019	"The Shanghai Semifinals – Part 2"	5.2%	3	
24	18 September 2019	"The Last Elimination"	5.2%	4	
25	22 September 2019	"HaMerotz LaMillion Finals"	7.3%	2	
26	25 September 2019	"Reunion"	<3.4%	>5	
