= Duvdevani and Kovach =

Duvdevani and Kovach (Hebrew: דובדבני וקובץ') is an Israeli comedy which made by Keshet Broadcasting starring by Lior Duvdevani and Ilan Kovach. The program originally premiered on 2011, on Bip channel and then aired on Channel 2 on Fridays.

== Plot ==
Lior Duvdevani and Ilan Kovach (Playing themselves) are two 30-years old unsuccessful singles who live together in a rented apartment in Tel Aviv and work at the ice cream parlor. On the second season they started working as security guards in the Big brother house purposely to participate the program.
