= M.K. 22 =

- Genre: Animated sitcom Satire
- Created by: Yaron Niski; Doron Tzur; Assaf Harel; Ohad Elimelech (Character design)
- Written by: Yaron Niski; Doron Tzur; Assaf Harel
- Directed by: Assaf Harel
- Voices of: Danny Steg; Haim Barbalat; Albert Iluz; Inbal Luri; Adib Jahschan; Miki Geva
- Ending theme: "Tamid Ola HaMangina" by The Pick Sisters
- Country of origin: Israel
- Original language: Hebrew
- No. of seasons: 1
- No. of episodes: 10

Production
- Running time: approx. 22 minutes
- Production company: Shortcut Design Post Production

Original release
- Network: Bip
- Release: 21 March 2004 – 2004

M.K. 22 (Hebrew: מ.ק. 22 - Mem Qoph 22) is an Israeli animated sitcom, revolving around the adventures of soldiers in a fictional IDF military base hosting the so-called "Israeli doomsday weapon". The show was created for the cable channel Bip and debuted in March 2004, becoming the first prime time animated series in Israeli television, and was later rebroadcast partly censored on Channel 2. The show won the Israeli Television Academy Award for Best Comedy Series and is considered by many a milestone in the history of Israeli animation. Despite gaining popularity and critical acclaim, the show was limited to one 10-episode season.

== Main cast and characters ==
=== Main characters ===
- Danny Steg as Corporal Shlomi Hanukkah: A narrow-minded soldier and a Mizrahi "ars".
- Haim Yafim Barbalat as Corporal Itai Shulman: Hanukkah's friend, an Ashkenazi nerd.
- Albert Iluz as Camp Commander Warrant Officer Gabriel Shukrun: A stupid, stubborn and manipulative NCO.
- Inbal Luri as Michal Levinstein: A handicapped volunteer, generally hated by all other involuntary soldiers for her self-righteousness.
- Adib Jahschan as Abed Abu Jamal: An Israeli Arab living near the base. He appears to be Shukrun's humble friend, while secretly being a terrorist training bionic shahid sheep. In the show he represents the "fifth column Israeli Arabs" stereotype.

=== Minor characters ===
- Nir Meyerovich as Addiso: The Beta Israeli guard of the base. No one treats him differently despite being Ethiopian, but his helmet is round while the other characters are square.
- Haim Al-Makis as Dudu Tapuach: A scheming contractor who is always thinking about business and exploiting foreign workers, an example of the phrase "the ugly Israeli." His name comes from a pun on David Appel.
- Dr. Seymour: a drug-addicted Russian doctor who was the head of a department at a hospital in Chernobyl. He often complains about his job and steals medicine from the base.
- Abed's sheep: tamed and educated sheep of Abed. They often help Abed in his attempts to bring about Palestinian rule over Israel or to launch nuclear missiles at Israeli settlements.
- Dudu's Workers: Three cannibalistic Thai workers who work for Dudu. They tried to eat Hanukkah in the episode "The Good Fence" and ate a soldier in the same episode.
- Ayala Levinstein: Michal's twin sister. They were conjoined twins who were kept by their mother during the separation surgery. She's her parents' favorite daughter because before the separation surgery they were told that only one of the girls would survive and they chose Ayala without thinking twice. She appears in the episode "Sabbath at the Base" where she asked Michal to give her her toe so she could become a model.
- Hadar Shahaf-Mayan as Gili Lahav Nahmani: a field reporter for the news, with a hoarse voice and a hunger for sensationalism, for which she interviews with a demonstrated lack of tact.
- Menashe Noy as the Chief of Staff: the IDF Chief of Staff who suffers from a short-term memory problem.

== Premise and production ==
M.K. 22 satirically deals with Israel Defense Forces manners and culture, and with general issues of Israeli society and current events in Israel. It is situated in the fictional top-secret logistics military base M.K. 22, in the south of Israel, storing the country's so-called nuclear missiles. Two of the show's creators, Yaron Niski and Doron Tzur, actually served together as logistics soldiers in an Israeli military base and the show is influenced by their experiences there.

The show's initial goal was "to combine the style of South Park with local cult such as Giv'at Halfon". Director Assaf Harel claimed that the fact that the show was created for a cable network made it possible to use a blacker and more extreme type of humor, which he compared to that of South Park. In general, South Park is widely considered the show's biggest influence by Israeli critics and fans. Obvious similarities to South Park include the crude style of animation, the use of live-action (the episode "One of Us" showed parts of the 1989 Israeli film of the same name, which the episode parodied), and a tongue-in-cheek disclaimer similar to that of South Park.

=== Name ===
M.K. stands for "machane keva", Hebrew for "permanent [military] camp", while the words "Mem Qoph 22" might sound like "milkud 22", the Hebrew translation for the idiom catch-22.

=== Themes ===
The show's themes included, among others, the tensions between Haredi Jews and homosexuals, the media attention given to Ilan Ramon (prior to his death), the aliyah from Ethiopia, the West Bank barrier and the Split broadcast incident. The show also parodied several films, TV shows, politicians and celebrities.

=== Animation ===
According to Harel, the show's style of animation was influenced by South Park, although M.K. 22 uses more 3D computer graphics and more complicated backgrounds. The show's characters and backgrounds are made to appear deliberately crude, though not as if they're made of cut-out pieces of paper. There is only one round shape in the entire series, one of the soldiers' helmets, whereas other naturally round shapes look quadrilateral or polygonal. The Sun, for instance, is a plain yellow square in the sky.

== Controversy ==
In 2005, when it was decided to broadcast the show on Channel 2, the show's straightforward treatment of delicate Israeli issues caused Keshet to censor parts of it. One of the episodes, "Robo Rabbi", was completely censored. It has been suggested that the background for the episode's censorship was the upcoming expiration of the Channel 2 tender. The episode parodied the threats of violence of Haredi Jews towards the pride parade, and spoofed the film Yossi & Jagger.

== List of episodes ==
1. "Heavy Water" (מים כבדים)
2. "Sabbath at the Base" (שבת בבסיס)
3. "The Good Fence" (הגדר הטובה)
4. "Wolf, Wolf" (זאב זאב)
5. "Time Travel" (בחזרה לעבר)
6. "The Trial" (המשפט)
7. "Robo Rabbi" (רובו רבי)
8. "Yizkor" (יזכור)
9. "Sex, Lies and Subarit" (סקס שקרים וסוברית)
10. "One of Us" (אחת משלנו)
