= Nature Valley =

American snack bar brand

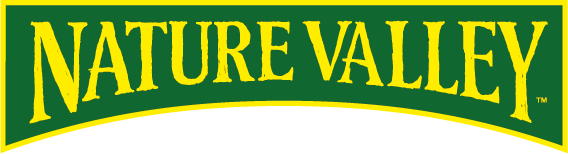

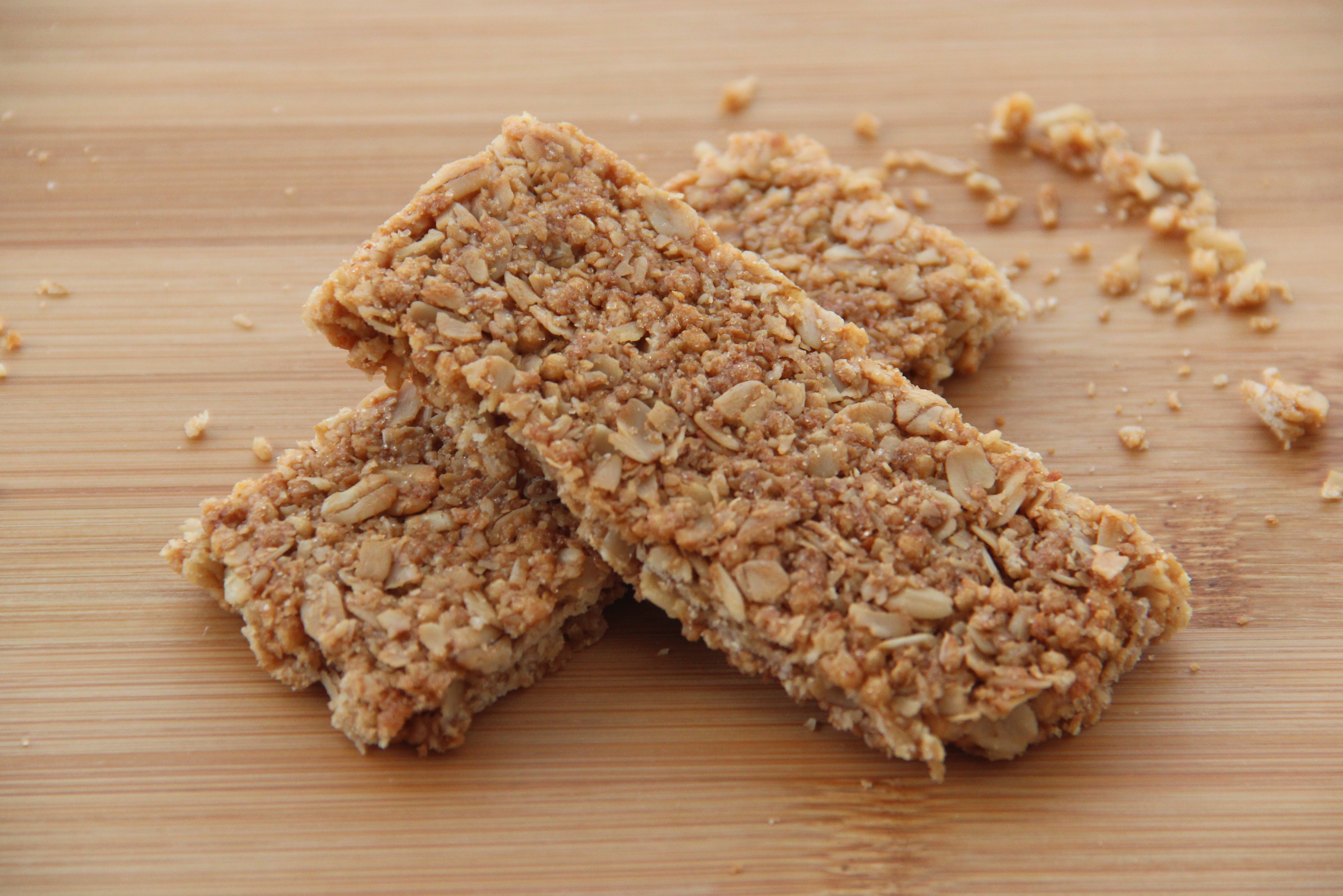
- Two Oats 'n Honey Nature Valley bars
- Product type: Granola bars
- Current owner: General Mills
- Country: United States
- Introduced: 1973; 53 years ago
- Tagline: We are better outside
- Website: www.naturevalley.com

Nature Valley is an American brand of snack bars owned by General Mills.

They produce a variety of cereal bars and granola bars. Common bars include: 'Oats and Honey', 'Fruit and Nut', and 'Peanut'. Their selection can be categorized as crunchy bars, protein bars, fruit and nut bars, and various nut bars.

== History ==
Nature Valley first launched with a granola cereal, but after realizing that their product could not be eaten outside and on the go, they introduced its granola bar in 1973. The brand later introduced more types of granola bars such as: crunchy, chewy, clusters, nut, yogurt coated and protein packed.
