= Ohad Elimelech =

Israeli artist and photographer

- אוהד אלימלך
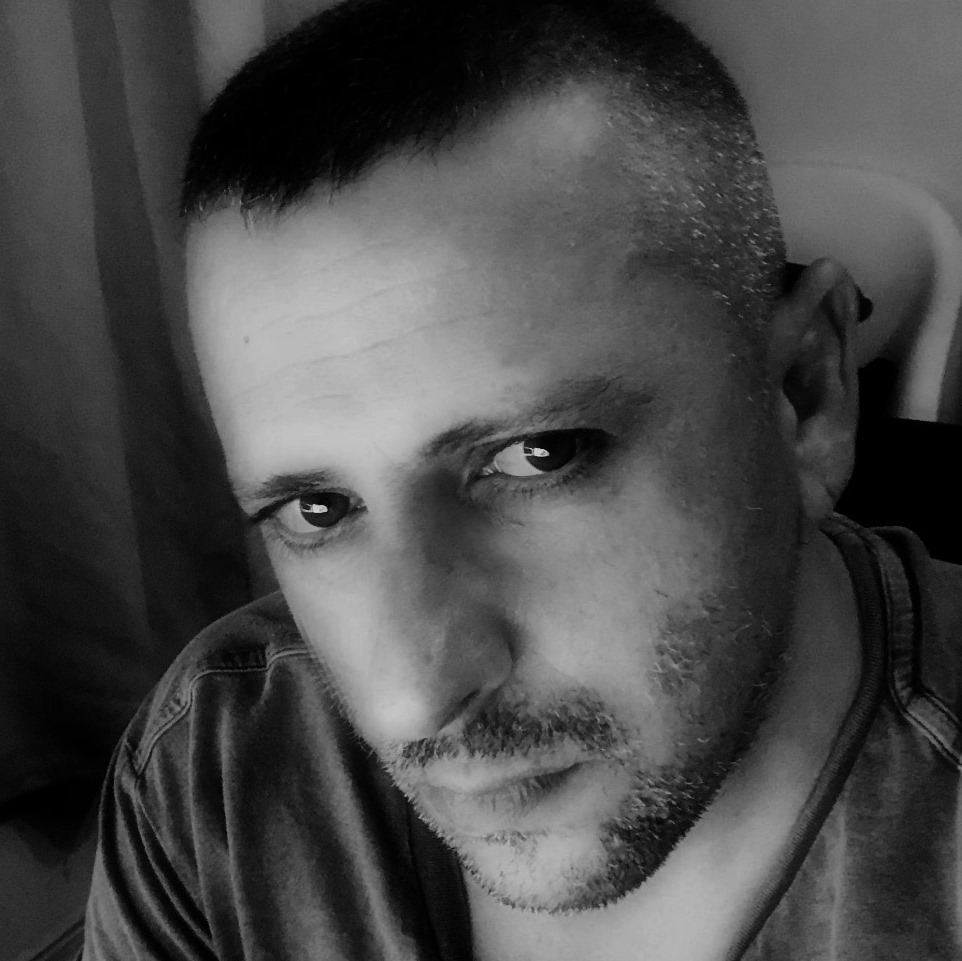
- Ohad Elimelech, 2019
- Born: 2 June 1975 (age 51); Nahariya, Israel
- Education: WIZO Haifa Academy of Design and Education
- Known for: Graphic design
- Notable work: M.K. 22
- Website: www.junkyard7.com

Ohad Elimelech (Hebrew: אוהד אלימלך; born 2 June 1975) is an Israeli artist, photographer, graphic designer, and animator who lives and works in Tel Aviv. In 2004, he co-created the award-winning Israeli animated series M.K. 22. In addition, he has designed many posters, party invitations, and album covers, and his creations have been displayed in a number of galleries.

== Early life and education ==
Ohad Elimelech was born in Nahariya on June 2, 1975 to Yossi Elimelech, a schoolteacher, and his wife Shoshana, a kindergarten teacher. He is the youngest of three brothers. In 1989, Elimelech began his studies at the Acre Naval Officers Academy. In 1993, he began his service in the Israeli Navy where he served for the next four years. During his service, Elimelech relocated to Haifa and immediately after his service began his studies at the WIZO Haifa Academy of Design and Education. In conjunction with his studies, Elimelech DJed at the local "City Hall" nightclub, formerly known as "Second City" (Hebrew: העיר השניה). He graduated from the WIZO Haifa Academy in 2002.

== Career ==
After graduation, Elimelech began creating and working with various types of mediums. His works combine photography, sketches, drawing, and scans of material and textures which he collects from the urban landscape and processes on his computer.

In 2004, Elimelech, along with Assaf Harel, Yaron Niski, and Doron Tzur, created the award-winning Israeli animated series M.K. 22.

In 2006, Elimelech's work was displayed at an exhibition titled "Anxieties in Doubt" (Hebrew: חרדות בספק), his first solo exhibition. The work exhibited two series of single works which deal with the body as part of the urban landscape, while using machine parts which merge into a single organic unit that tries to adapt to the new emerging environment. His works have been defined as "conveying to the viewer the sense of uncertainty and surrealist situations in the urban landscape which is portrayed as threatening and unstable".

In 2009, Elimelech along with Avi Haltovsky, designed an official poster commemorating 61 years of Israel independence and the centenary of the first modern Jewish city, Tel Aviv. That same year, his work was displayed at an exhibition titled "100 Identities", which primarily consisted of works by artists from the LGBT community.

In winter 2015-2016, following the Ethiopian Jews protest, Elimelech displayed his art at an exhibition titled "Yes, No, Black, White". His exhibition consisted of traditional African masks with a westernized feel to them.

In 2016, Elimelech's instructional video titled "Tom's Secret" (Hebrew: הסוד של תום) was declared as the official production for the European Day on the Protection of Children against Sexual Exploitation and Sexual Abuse; it was later adopted by various countries which requested it be translated in order to adapt it to their own educational curricula.

In 2019, Elimelech designed Pro-Equality campaign posters for the annual Pride Parade.

== Personal life ==
Elimelech resides in Tel Aviv with his son, Tomer.
