= Bip (Israeli TV channel) =

Israeli television channel and brand

- Country: Israel

Ownership
- Owner: Keshet Media Group

History
- Launched: 2000
- Closed: 31 December 2010 (as a linear channel)

Links
- Website: www.bip.co.il

Bip (Hebrew: ביפ, pronounced beep) is a comedy web portal, a production unit and nighttime TV strip on Israel's Channel 2, owned by Keshet.

== History ==
Founded in 2000, it was included in the channel pack of the Israeli digital cable system (Golden Channels, Matav, Tevel, the current HOT) and was presented at a press conference on 27 July that year. Initially, the channel broadcast for twelve hours a day and was aimed at a 15-25 demographic. Tevel was the first company interested, but Matav and Golden Channels were also interested, as it was a non-exclusive contract.

In 2009, the channel broadcast Israeli based television shows, and foreign ones such as South Park, Seinfeld, Friends and NewsRadio, but also included Israeli based original television shows, including BeHafra'a ("Disturbance"), an Israeli version of Distraction hosted by Ido Rosenblum, Mahadura Mugbelet ("Limited Edition"), a satire show, Project Bip, a stand-up comedy competition, Crime Animals, crime comedy, and Quicky, a sitcom . Most of its shows were limited for the age 14 and older. The channel also broadcast several non-comedy foreign shows, such as Buffy the Vampire Slayer, Star Trek and more.

During July 2010, it was announced that Big would shut down as a linear channel being replaced by an Israeli version of Comedy Central, put up under HOT's control. The decision was taken by HOT as an act of divergences between Keshet and HOT shareholders. Bip's editor-in-chief Yuval Natan criticized the decision, claiming that there was no reason to remove it, considering that it was a leader in its segment. On 31 December 2010 Bip ended its broadcasts on HOT and opened as bip.co.il portal and weekend TV nightly comedy strip.

== Original shows ==
- Bobby and Me
- Ahmed and Salim
- Layla Be'Kef
- Citizen Kopatch
- Yalla, Next
- Efrat Touring Israel
- M.K. 22
- Toffee and the Gorilla

== Foreign shows ==
- ALF
- Buffy the Vampire Slayer
- Comedy Central Presents
- Comedy Inc.
- Cowboy Bebop
- Curb Your Enthusiasm
- Dilbert
- Everybody Hates Chris
- Frasier
- Friends
- Futurama
- Happy Tree Friends
- I Bet You Will
- Just Shoot Me!
- MADtv
- Malcolm in the Middle
- Married... with Children
- Monty Python's Flying Circus
- NewsRadio
- Reno 911!
- Seinfeld
- Soap
- South Park
- Star Trek
- The Benny Hill Show
- The Cosby Show
- The Drew Carey Show
- The Larry Sanders Show
- The Marriage Ref
- The Simple Life
- The Simpsons
- The Wonder Years
