= Murder of Nava Elimelech =

Unsolved murder of an Israeli girl

Nava Elimelech
- רצח אלימלך
- Born: 1970; Bat Yam, Israel
- Died: March 20, 1982 (aged 10–11); Bat Yam, Israel
- Cause of death: Homicide
- Known for: Victim of unsolved murder

The murder of Nava Elimelech (Hebrew: רצח נאוה אלימלך) is an unresolved 1982 murder of an 11-year-old girl in Bat Yam, Israel.

== The murder ==
Nava Elimelech was the younger daughter of Makhlouf and Mazal Elimelech. She left her parents' house in Bat Yam on March 20, 1982, to visit a friend's home, which was about 300 meters away. She left behind a note to her parents, which had the following message: "To Mom and Dad and the whole family: I'm going to Tali. Don't worry, I'll be back home. I love you very much." Her 19-year-old sister was the last person to see her alive.

After it was discovered that she hadn't arrived at her friend's house, Elimelech's family reported her disappearance to the police. A police search for her began that evening. Over the following days, police and thousands of civilian volunteers searched for her throughout the Gush Dan area. Her photo was distributed, police dogs were deployed to search for her scent in dunes in the surrounding area, and residents of the neighborhood were questioned. On the tenth day of the search, people who were exercising on the beach in Herzliya found Nava Elimelech's head, packed in a plastic bag. Other parts of her body, also in bags, were discovered near the Tel Baruch beach in northern Tel Aviv. The pathologist who examined the body parts determined that Elimelech had been killed on the day of her disappearance. The killing shocked the nation of Israel, and Elimelech was later buried in the southern cemetery in Bat Yam.

== Inquiry ==
After the murder, the police formed a special investigative team numbering 40 investigators and detectives. The team operated for several months and came to be defined as "the largest in the history of the Israeli police". The investigation was described as "particularly complicated", because the investigators had no edge, as there were no weapons or evidence at the crime scene. The team called dozens of people for questioning at various levels, but were unable to solve the case. As part of the investigation, parts of the body were sent to a London laboratory in an attempt to identify the murder weapon. In June 1983, police said the homicide case was a dead end.

Police cadaver dogs who had smelled clothes Elimelech had worn led investigators to the home of David Levy, a Bat Yam resident who lived close to the home of the Elimelech family and who had at one time worked with Elimelech's father. In his home, authorities found pictures of Elimelech and her friends. A police search was conducted, but no evidence was found connecting him to the murder. However, Levy was discovered to have taken nude photos of female students at Gordon Elementary School. He was subsequently convicted of pedophilia and jailed.

Police questioned lifeguards, boat owners, and regular visitors to the beach in the area where her remains were found, but no one reported having seen a man carrying suspicious-looking bags on the beach.

In 1998, police arrested brothers Yehuda and Amos Shelef as suspects in the killing after Yehuda's ex-wife claimed he had confessed committing the murder to her. Yehuda's home was searched and his yard was excavated, but no evidence was found. The brothers were ultimately released due to lack of evidence. Yehuda later claimed that this event has plagued them, and demanded that their names be cleared.

Zippora Rimer, a parapsychologist, attempted to decipher the case. It was later revealed that her past successes were fraudulent.

Former Israeli police commander and criminologist Avi Davidowicz has concluded that Elimelech was likely the victim of a serial killer. According to Davidowicz, 10 children who disappeared in the Tel Aviv metropolitan area between 1974 and 1994 (only two of whose bodies were ever found, including Elimelech), were likely murdered by a lone individual. Davidowicz claimed that police would have stood a better chance of solving the murder had these cases been linked at the time. However, he stated that the investigators of the time should not be judged too harshly, as they did not have the know-how police do today.

=== Suspected nationalist attack ===
In January 1983, an Arab resident of Gaza was arrested on suspicion of committing the murder, but he was later released due to lack of evidence. Shortly after, the Chief of the General Staff at the time, Rafael Eitan, claimed that the act was carried by a nationalist terrorist organization. Police officers, including police chief Arie Ivtsen, expressed reservations about those claims.

On December 31, 2001, Yitzhak Gatnio, an officer who was on the original investigation team, was interviewed on Galatz. He revealed that the Shin Bet found evidence supporting the theory that nationalists committed the murder. An Arab jailed on criminal charges who cooperated with the Shin Bet gave Gatnio information about the murder. The informer claimed a cellmate of his admitted to being the killer of Nava Elimelech. This man, a terrorist collaborator, had already been released from jail and fled to Jordan. Tests conducted by the investigators revealed that the man was in the neighborhood where Elimelech had disappeared on March 20, 1982, working at a grocery store. He wasn't investigated at the time, and as far as the informer knew, the man had died while in Jordan.

== Renewal of the investigation ==
On August 4, 2019, it was announced that, with court approval, the police had exhumed Elimelech's body from her grave for further testing at the Abu Kabir Forensic Institute. Police investigators compiled a profile of the killer suggesting that he was still living, aged 70 (around 30 at the time of Elimelech's murder), had a criminal background, and was living in central Israel. A total of 100 detectives were assigned to the case. The case had been reopened due to recent technological breakthroughs in DNA identification a few months prior. A gag order was placed concerning the progress on the case. On August 28, the police returned a pair of earrings to the family. On August 29, former suspect Amos Shelef was called in for questioning. However, he was reportedly not a suspect in the case, leaving it unclear as to why he was questioned.

== See also ==
- Lists of solved missing person cases
- List of unsolved murders (1980–1999)
