= All Men Are Mortal (film) =

- Theatrical release poster
- Directed by: Ate de Jong
- Screenplay by: Steven Gaydos; Ate de Jong; Olwen Wymark
- Based on: All Men Are Mortal by Simone de Beauvoir
- Produced by: Frédéric Golchan; Matthijs van Heijningen
- Starring: Irène Jacob; Stephen Rea; Marianne Sägebrecht
- Cinematography: Bruno de Keyzer
- Edited by: Nicolas Gaster
- Music by: Simon Fisher-Turner; Michael Gibbs
- Production companies: Nova Films; Sigma Pictures
- Distributed by: Warner Bros. (United Kingdom); Concorde Film (Netherlands)
- Release dates: 17 November 1995 (UK); 30 November 1995 (NED)
- Running time: 90 minutes
- Countries: United Kingdom; Netherlands; France
- Language: English

All Men Are Mortal is a 1995 film directed by Ate de Jong and starring Irène Jacob, Stephen Rea, and Marianne Sägebrecht. It is based on the novel All Men Are Mortal (1946) by Simone de Beauvoir.

== Cast ==
- Irène Jacob as Regina
- Stephen Rea as Fosca
- Marianne Sägebrecht as Annie
- Colin Salmon as Chas
- Maggie O'Neill as Florence
- John Nettles as Sanier
- Steve Nicolson as Laforet
- Jango Edwards as Adelson
- Derek de Lint as Bertus
- Chiara Mastroianni as Françoise
- David Healy as Movie Producer
- Michael Gaunt as The Mayor of Rouen
- George Raistrick as Police Chief
- Jane Wymark as Gertrude, The Actress
- Terence McGinity as Claudius, The Actor
- Flóra Kádár as Old Woman
