= Het Bombardement =

- Theatrical release poster
- Directed by: Ate de Jong
- Written by: Ate de Jong; Paul Ruven
- Produced by: San Fu Maltha
- Starring: Jan Smit; Monic Hendrickx; Roos van Erkel; Gerard Cox; Pieter van der Sman
- Edited by: Herman P. Koerts
- Music by: Fons Merkies
- Distributed by: Dutch FilmWorks
- Release date: 19 December 2012
- Running time: 104 minutes
- Country: Netherlands
- Language: Dutch

Het Bombardement (Dutch for The Bombing) is a 2012 Dutch war drama film directed by Ate de Jong and produced by San Fu Maltha, starring Jan Smit and Roos van Erkel. The story line begins shortly before the Bombing of Rotterdam and concerns the impossible love between a young boxer (Smit) and an engaged girl (Van Erkel) as the Second World War reaches the Netherlands. The film was critically panned following its release.

== Plot ==
The film is set in May 1940 in and around the city of Rotterdam, where a young baker's assistant (and aspiring amateur boxer) Vincent de Graaf meets the wealthy Eva von Heerle, the daughter of German refugees who had fled Nazi Germany. Eva is engaged to Dirk Lagerwaard, a wealthy older industrial whom she does not love. In contrast, Vincent wants to emigrate to the United States to find a cure for his sick brother. The two fall in love. As German troops invade the Netherlands, Vincent offers Dirk to bring Eva and her parents to Rotterdam resulting in a dangerous journey through the frontlines as Dutch and German troops clash in bitter combat. As the two reach Rotterdam, an ultimatum is delivered to the Dutch troops defending the city in which they are summoned to surrender immediately or face destruction, the Dutch soldiers refused, but Rotterdam was declared an open city.

== Reception ==
The film received negative reviews. Several critics attacked the film's plot, which was said to be a bad imitation of the story line of Titanic (1997). Both concerned an impossible love between a lower-class boy and an upper-class girl already engaged to a wealthy but unloving older man culminating in a dramatic disaster. Others considered many of the characters to be stereotypes and criticized the film for its corny dialogues, bad acting and predictability, the De Telegraaf finding the romance plot to be as predictable as the bombing itself. The film also provoked a public outcry from several survivors of the Rotterdam bombing, who were offended that the bombing was used as a mere plot element for a simplistic romance film. The Algemeen Dagblad called the film poorly made and offensive to the victims of the bombing with a Belgian critic going on to say that watching the film was the worst experience in his life.
