= Ate de Jong =

Dutch film director (born 1953)

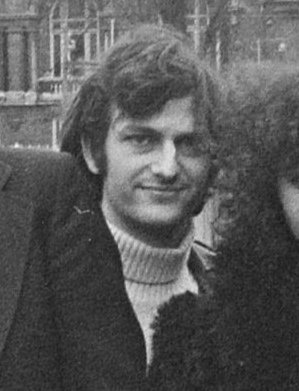
- De Jong in 1976
- Born: 1953 (age 71–72); Aardenburg, Zeeland, Netherlands
- Occupations: Director; film producer; screenwriter
- Years active: 1976–present

Ate de Jong (born 1953) is a Dutch film and television director, film producer, and screenwriter. He is best known as the producer of The Discovery of Heaven (2001), nominated for a Golden Calf award, and Het Bombardement (2012).

== Filmography ==
=== Director ===
- Alle dagen feest (1976) (Every Day a Party)
- Blindgangers (1977) (Blind Spot)
- Dag Dokter (1978) (Inheritance)
- Bekende gezichten, gemengde gevoelens (1980) (Familiar Faces, Mixed Feelings)
- Een vlucht regenwulpen (1981) (A Flight of Rainbirds)
- Brandende liefde (1983) (Burning Love)
- In de schaduw van de overwinning (1986) (Shadow of Victory)
- Miami Vice (1 episode, 1987) - "Missing Hours"
- Drop Dead Fred (1991)
- Highway to Hell (1992)
- Tödliche Lüge (1993) (TV) (alternative title: Die Wahrheit hinter den Kulissen) (Germany)
- All Men Are Mortal (1995)
- Eine kleine Nachtmerrie (1996) TV series
- Wenn ich nicht mehr lebe (1996) (TV)
- Wenn der Präsident 2x klingelt (1997) (TV)
- Die Straßen von Berlin (1 episode, 1999) - "Hackfleisch"
- Fogbound (2002)
- Ek lief jou (2011)
- Het Bombardement (2012)
- Deadly Virtues: Love.Honour.Obey. (2014)
- Love Is Thicker Than Water (2016)

=== Writer ===
- Alle dagen feest (1976) (Every Day a Party)
- Blindgangers (1977) (Blind Spot)
- Dag Dokter (1978) (Inheritance)
- Bekende gezichten, gemengde gevoelens (1980) (Known Faces, Mixed Feelings)
- Een vlucht regenwulpen (1981) (A Flight of Rainbirds)
- Brandende liefde (1983) (Burning Love)
- In de schaduw van de overwinning (1986) (Shadow of Victory)
- Een maand later (1987) (A Month Later)
- All Men Are Mortal (1995)
- Die Straßen von Berlin (1 episode, 1999)
- Fogbound (2002) (writer)

=== Producer ===
- Left Luggage (1998)
- Enigma (2001) (associate producer)
- The Discovery of Heaven (2001)
- Fogbound (2002) (producer)
- Summer Heat (2008) (producer)
- Zwart Water (2010) (post-production) (executive producer)

=== Self ===
- De Wereld draait door (2 episodes, 2007)
- Allemaal film (2 episodes, 2007)
