= Cultural depictions of Conrad II, Holy Roman Emperor =

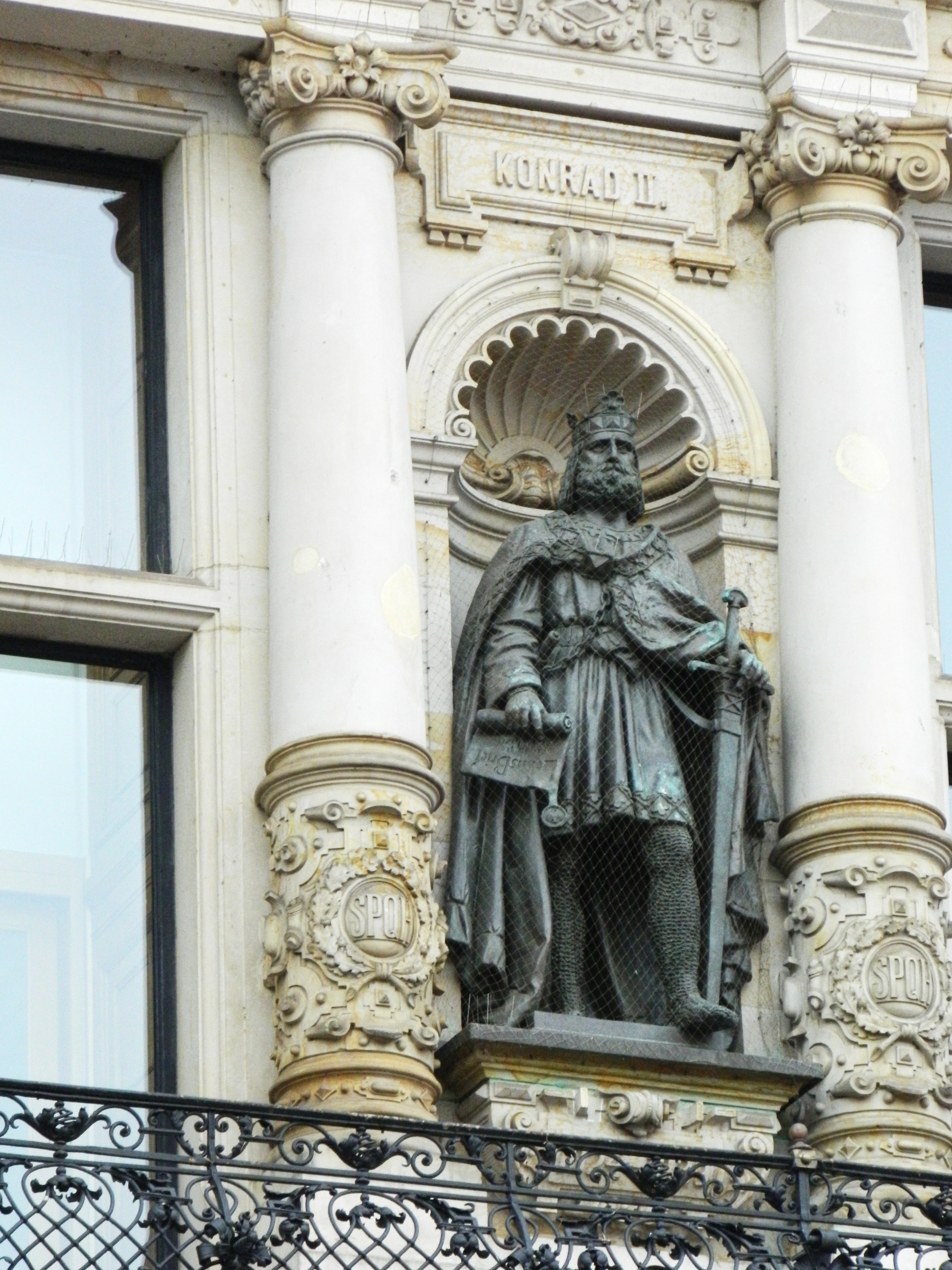
Conrad II's statue in City Hall, Hamburg. The sculptor was Wilhelm Kumm fm Berlin (1892–1894).

Conrad II was German king (1024–1039) and Holy Roman emperor (1027–1039). As founder of the Salian dynasty, he was a successful ruler who left his successor a stable monarchy. His behaviours in ecclesiastic affairs have caused some controversies even in his lifetime. He also left two notable architectural projects in the Speyer Cathedral and the Limburg Abbey. He is depicted several times in folk literature and fine arts.

== Historiography ==
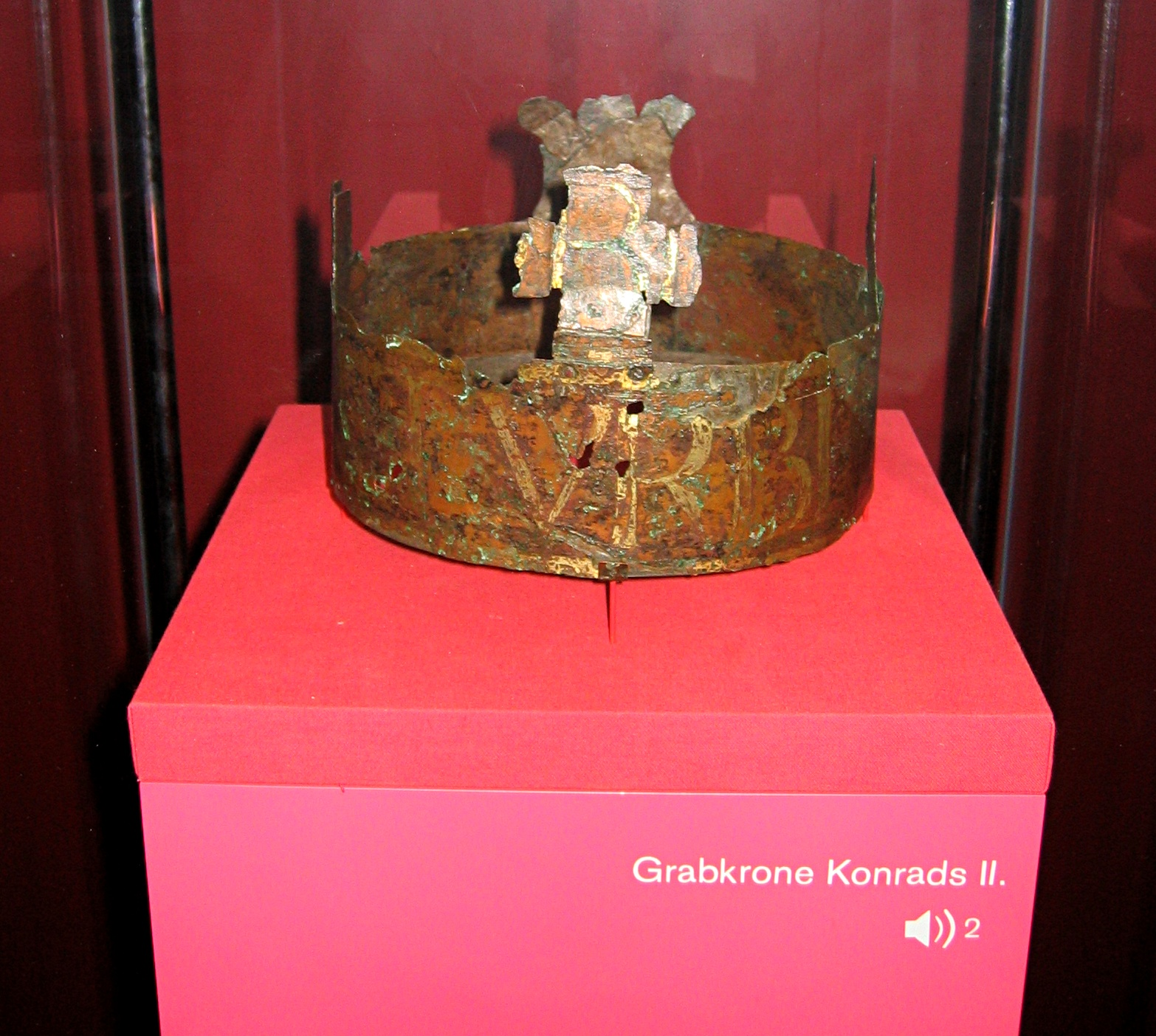
Burial crown of Conrad II. Inscription: ATOR ET VARIBIS: PAVSA.

The reign of Conrad, who was "an illiterate layman", was framed by those of two very educated and religious rulers who were both named Henry. The Italian Chronicon Novalicense calls him a "rex idiota" ("idiota" just means "illiterate", and not "idiotic"). Wilson remarks that this reflects the prejudice of the clerical elite towards the emperor. Gregory Halfond notes that the Frankish-German lay aristocracy knew this when they chose Conrad—a king who, unlike Henry II, would not continue a "conflictual kingship" (Stefan Weinfurter's term) and would not favour the imperial church over the lay aristocracy. Halfond opines that their view of Conrad was not wrong. The views of Conrad II's personality and reign in the nineteenth century and early twentieth century were divided. Pro-papal, anti-imperial scholars tended to have a negative view. Harry Bresslau denounced him as the "least spiritual of all German rulers." Augustin Fliche described him as a "souverain without faith". By contrast, small-German (kleindeutsche), laicist, anti-clerical scholars saw him as the epitome of medieval imperial grandeur. Karl Hampe called him "perhaps the most self-contained and strong-willed ruling personality of the entire German Middle Age" and "a full-bodied layman, well versed in sword-play", "with a healthy sense of power, little touched by the world of ideas".

According to Johannes Fried, only after World War II, the scholarly depiction of Conrad slowly changed: "It was the remarkable 1992 exhibition "The Salian Reich" that lifted him and his family out of the shadows of the graves in Speyer, into which they had sunken previously in the general German historical consciousness." He has become understood as a ruler who was conventionally pious and who saw himself as the Lord's Anointed. Fried praises Herwig Wolfram's erudite biography Konrad II., 990-1039: Kaiser dreier Reiche for the portrayal of the ruler, who appeared as a pragmatist who "always had many arrows in his quiver"—he was not a German national hero with lofty plans, nor a great one in the historical sense, but a successful and respectable politician who shared work with his Empress and who was more similar to modern doers than to medieval heroes. Reviewing Wolfram's book, Monnet praised Conrad as the ruler associated with a brilliant moment in the imperial history, and yet also the first who recognized the dangers in his vast collection of three kingdoms and succeeded in bringing the ministeriales into princely and royal administration.

Regarding his military capability, Wolfram opines that, "Conrad II was not an accomplished general; his most important military triumphs were achieved by others, particularly in Lotharingia and Burgundy, and his victories against the Poles, as well as his defeats at the hands of the Hungarians, were essentially thrown into his lap. All of Conrad's wars, regardless of where they were waged in the west, south, or east served basically the same purpose, that is, to preserve and protect, or, if you will, 'defend', the kingdom."

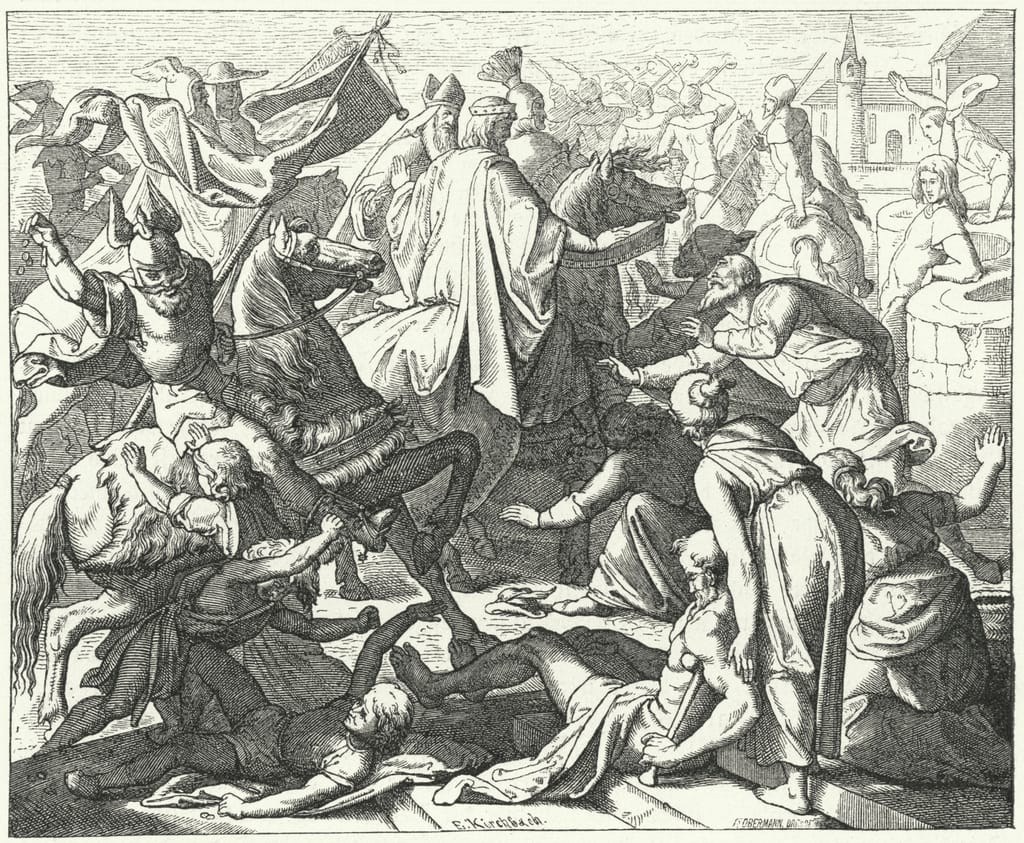
German School - Coronation procession of the Holy Roman Emperor Conrad II - (MeisterDrucke-1045926)

Egon Boshof comments on Conrad, "Strengthening the royal authority internally and consolidating the reputation of the empire externally were the great achievement of the first Salian emperor, who spent all his power early in restless commitment to the fulfillment of these tasks. His energy was paired with a harshness that did not lack excesses, especially in the face of opponents of royal majesty." (Note: "Die Stärkung der königlichen Autorität nach innen und die Festigung des Ansehens des Reiches nach außen ist die große Leistung des ersten Saliers, der seine Kräfte in rastlosem Einsatz für die Erfüllung dieser Aufgaben früh verbrauchte. Seine Energie war gepaart mit einer Härte, der Züge der Maßlosigkeit — vor allem in der Verfolgung der Widersacher königlicher Majestät — nicht fehlen")

Like Fried and Wolfram, Blumenthal opines that in religious matters, Conrad generally adhered closely to the policies of his predecessor Henry II who had paved the way for a strong theocratic regime. He disposed of bishoprics and abbeys but also facilitated reform. Blumenthal also pointed out some negative aspects like the distribution of abbeys, bishoprics and church property in exchange for territorial and financial gains or the treatment of Aribert of Milan and Burchard of Lyon.

- Boshof, Egon (2008). Die Salier (in German). W. Kohlhammer Verlag. p. 91. ISBN 978-3-17-020183-5.
- Erkens, Franz-Reiner (1998). Konrad II., um 990–1039: Herrschaft und Reich des ersten Salierkaisers (in German). Pustet. ISBN 978-3-7917-1604-6.
- Hampe, Karl (1912). Deutsche Kaisergeschichte in der Zeit der Salier und Staufer (in German). Quelle und Meyer (Spamersche Druck.). p. 7.
- Weinfurter, Stefan (1999). The Salian Century: Main Currents in an Age of Transition. University of Pennsylvania Press. pp. 38–43. ISBN 978-0-8122-3508-1.
- Wolfram, Herwig (2000). Konrad II., 990–1039: Kaiser dreier Reiche (in German). Beck. ISBN 978-3-406-46054-8.
- Wolfram, Herwig (1 November 2010). Conrad II, 990–1039: Emperor of Three Kingdoms. Penn State Press. ISBN 978-0-271-04818-5.

== Legends ==
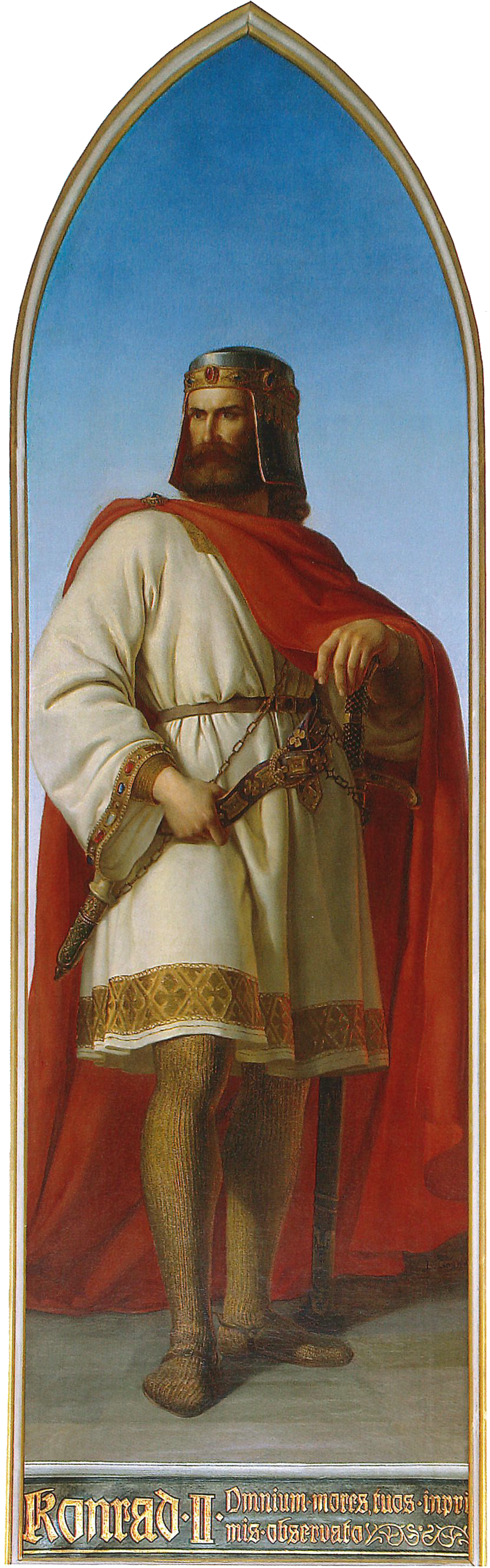
Kaisersaal Frankfurt am Main, Nr. 13 - Konrad II., (Lorenz Clasen)

- Jacobus de Voragine (1230–1298) recounts some legends about Conrad. One is about his repression of an Italian bishop: "The next emperor was Conrad (II), duke of Franconia, who married the niece of Saint Henry. In his time a fiery meteor of wondrous size was seen in the heavens, crossing the sun at sunset and falling to earth. Conrad imprisoned several Italian bishops and, because the archbishop of Milan made his escape, set fire to the outlying section of that city. On Pentecost Sunday, while the emperor was being crowned in a small church outside the city, such a violent storm of thunder and lightning broke out during the mass that some of those present went mad and others died of fright. Bishop Bruno, who celebrated the mass, and others including the bishop's secretary, said that as the mass was proceeding, they saw Saint Ambrose threatening the emperor."
- The story about the women of Weinsberg is the subject of many poems praising the virtues of German womanhood. According to Hermann Schoenfeld's Women of the Teutonic Nations (1908), "When the emperor besieged the city of Weinsberg in Suabia he met with such a stout resistance that he swore in his wrath to slay all those who were able to carry arms. At last when hunger forced surrender, the women appeared in Konrad's camp pleading for mercy, but the emperor permitted them only to take as much of their precious possessions from the doomed city as they could carry on their backs. And behold! Next morning when the gates opened, every woman tottered along under the burden of her husband on her shoulders. Konrad's magnates maintained that this was not the meaning of the grace offered to the women, but the emperor, touched by so much loyalty and love, exclaimed: “An Imperial word shall not be distorted by interpretation. The pledge as understood by the Women of Weinsberg shall hold good!"
- The story Emperor Conrad and the count's son in the Gesta Romanorum is greatly similar to the fairytale The Devil (or the Giant) with the Three Golden Hairs. In this version, the protagonist is the son of the Count of Caln, who had offended the emperor and thus fled to a hut in the Black Forest. The boy is adopted by Duke Herman of Swabia. When Conrad sent the youth to Aachen with a letter instructing the empress to kill him, it was the dean of the Speyer Cathedral who save the young count and changed the instruction, so Caln could marry the princess. When Conrad found out, he became reconciled with the events and made the count, now his son-in-law his co-regent. Because the dean had prevented innocent blood to be shed, he was made chancellor and it was also because of this action, the imperial burial vault was constructed in Speyer.

== Depictions in arts ==
=== Salian arts ===
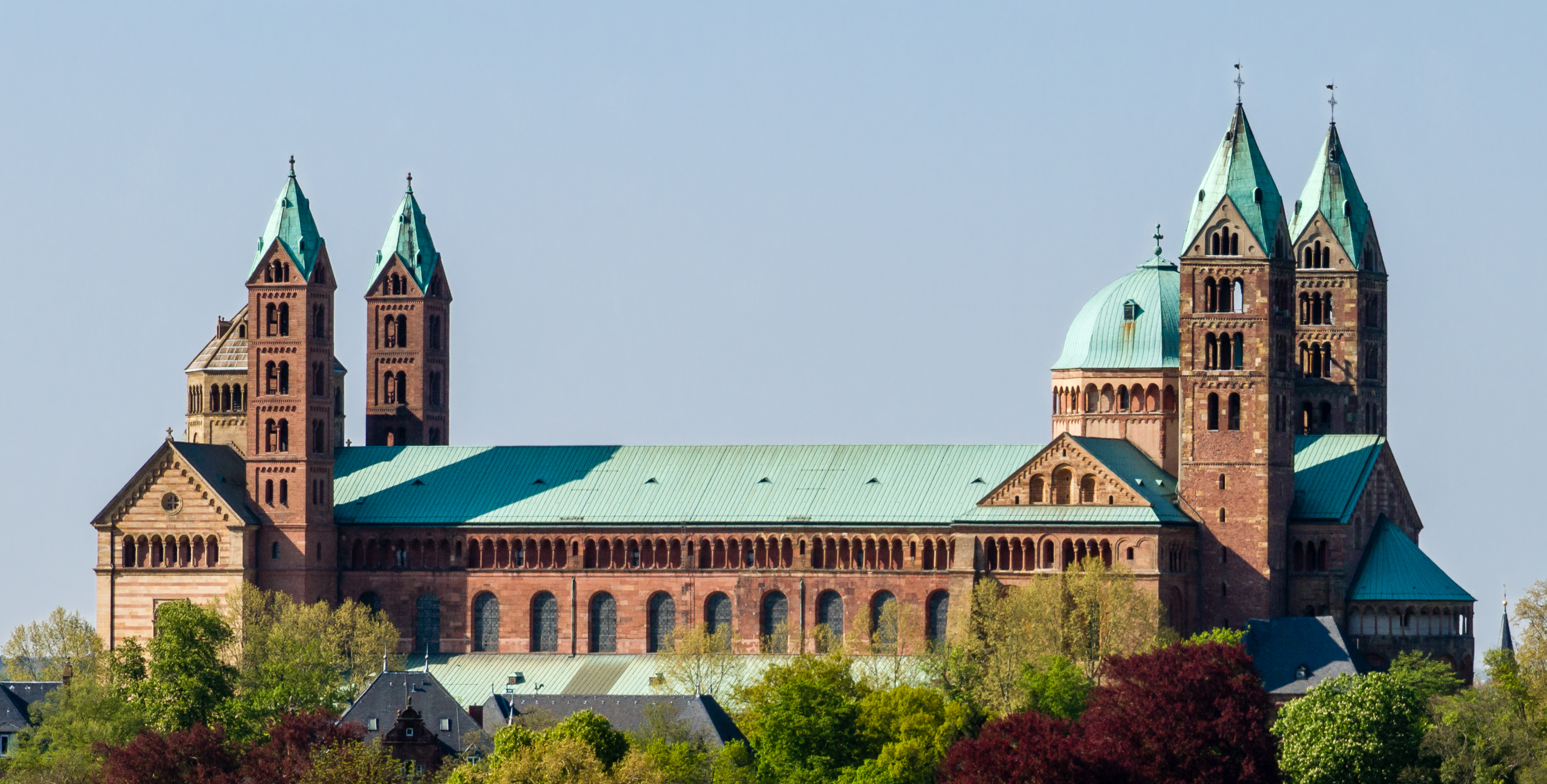
Speyer Cathedral

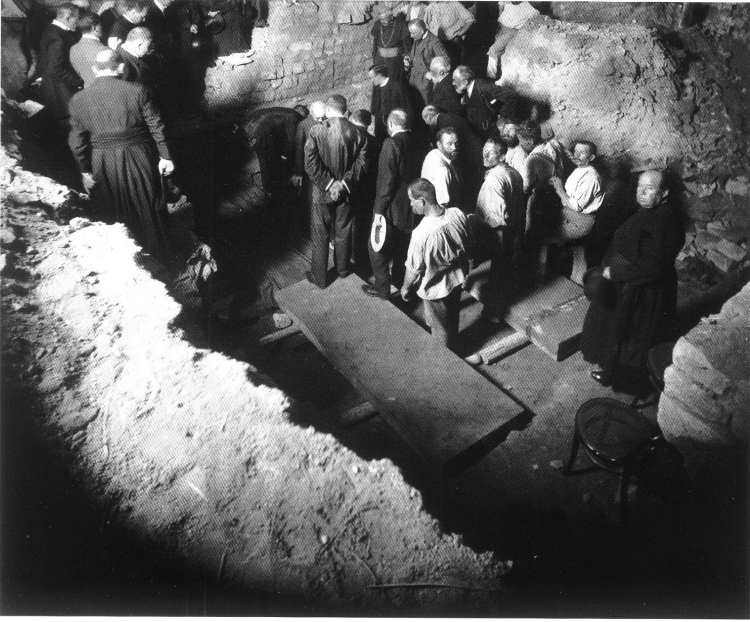
Opening of Conrad II's grave in Speyer Cathedral (1900)

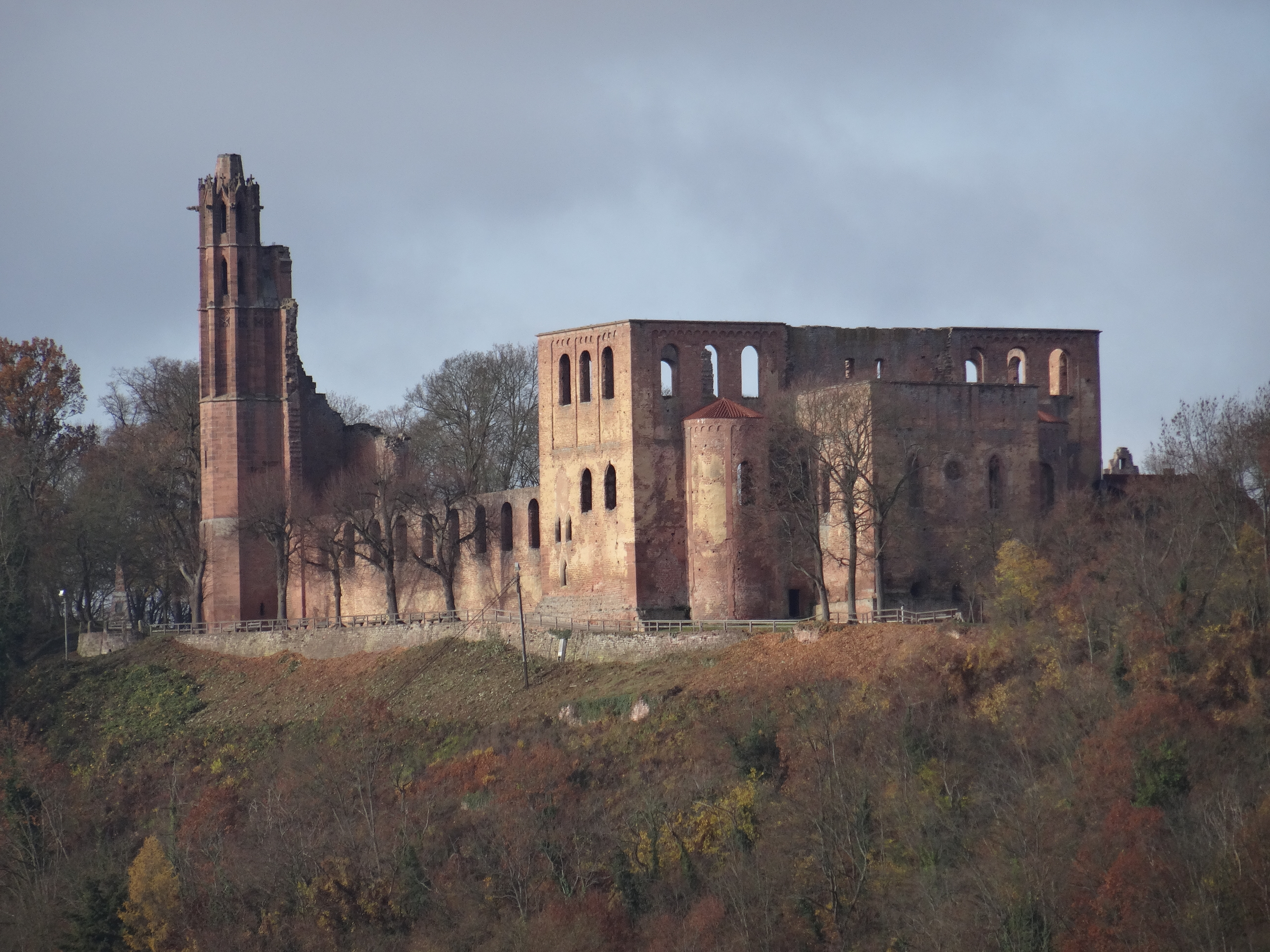
Limburg Abbey

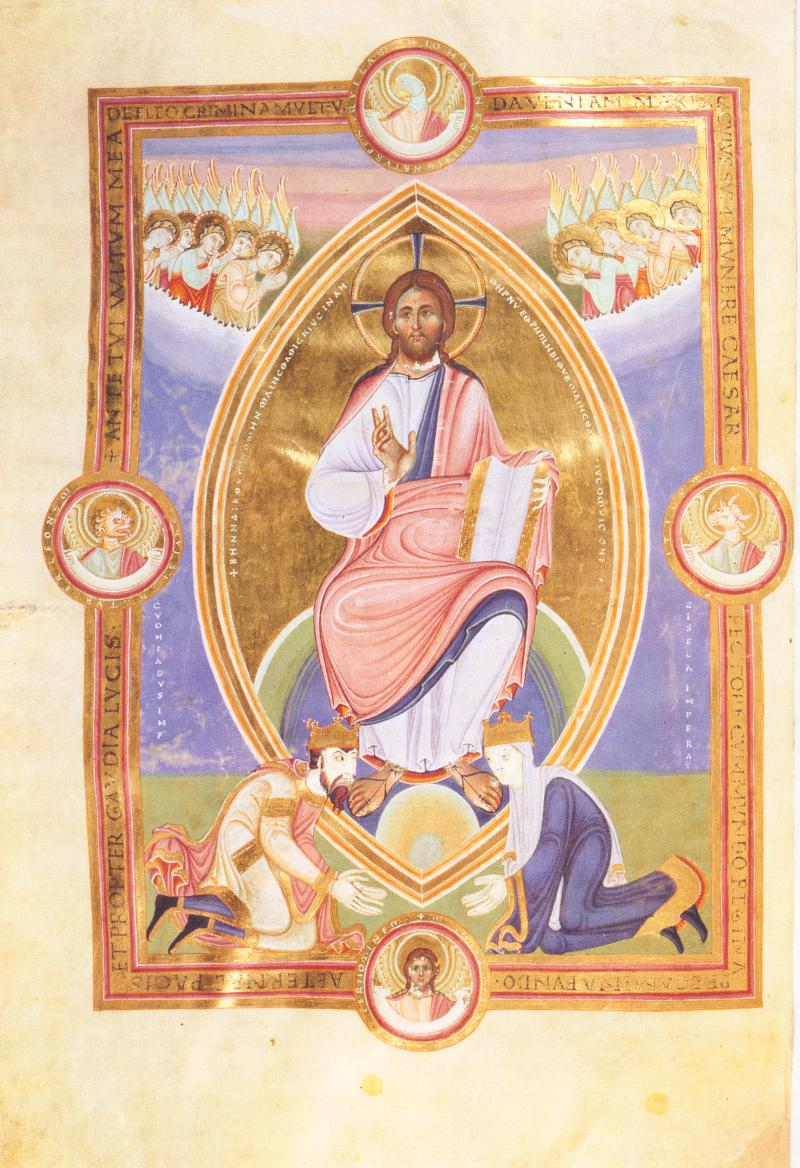
Conrad and Gisela in front of Christ in the Golden Gospels of Henry III

==== Architecture ====
- The Speyer Cathedral was founded by Conrad II. Recent scholarship shows that he intended this cathedral to become his family's burial place from the beginning. The structure reflects Conrad's concept of royal representation. The patron saint, Virgin Mary, was also the patron of Conrad and his family. The original design was less imposing than its current form. The church edifice was conceived as a "directional structure" that would direct the viewer from the entrance (west) towards the choir (east). The simplicity was considered by the contemporaries as "modern" and in Weinfurter's opinion, provided a more uplifting effect than the current arrangement. Conrad favoured a dynamic concept, as also shown with the church in Limburg. There are statues of Conrad, Gisela, Henry III, Henry IV and Bertha in the Kaiser-Halle, erected in the nineteenth century.
- The Limburg Abbey was another Romanesque construction, now exists as an imposing ruin. Legends recount that the emperor laid the cornerstone on the same day the Speyer Cathedral's construction was commenced, but according to Wolfram, at this time, Conrad was in Hungary.

==== Golden Gospels of Henry III ====
- The Golden Gospels of Henry III, also called the Golden Evangeliary of Speyer, shows Conrad and Gisela kneeling in front of Christ while Henry and Agnes approaching the Virgin. Christ represents the past while the Virgin represents Hope and Future.

=== Later depictions ===
==== Visual arts ====
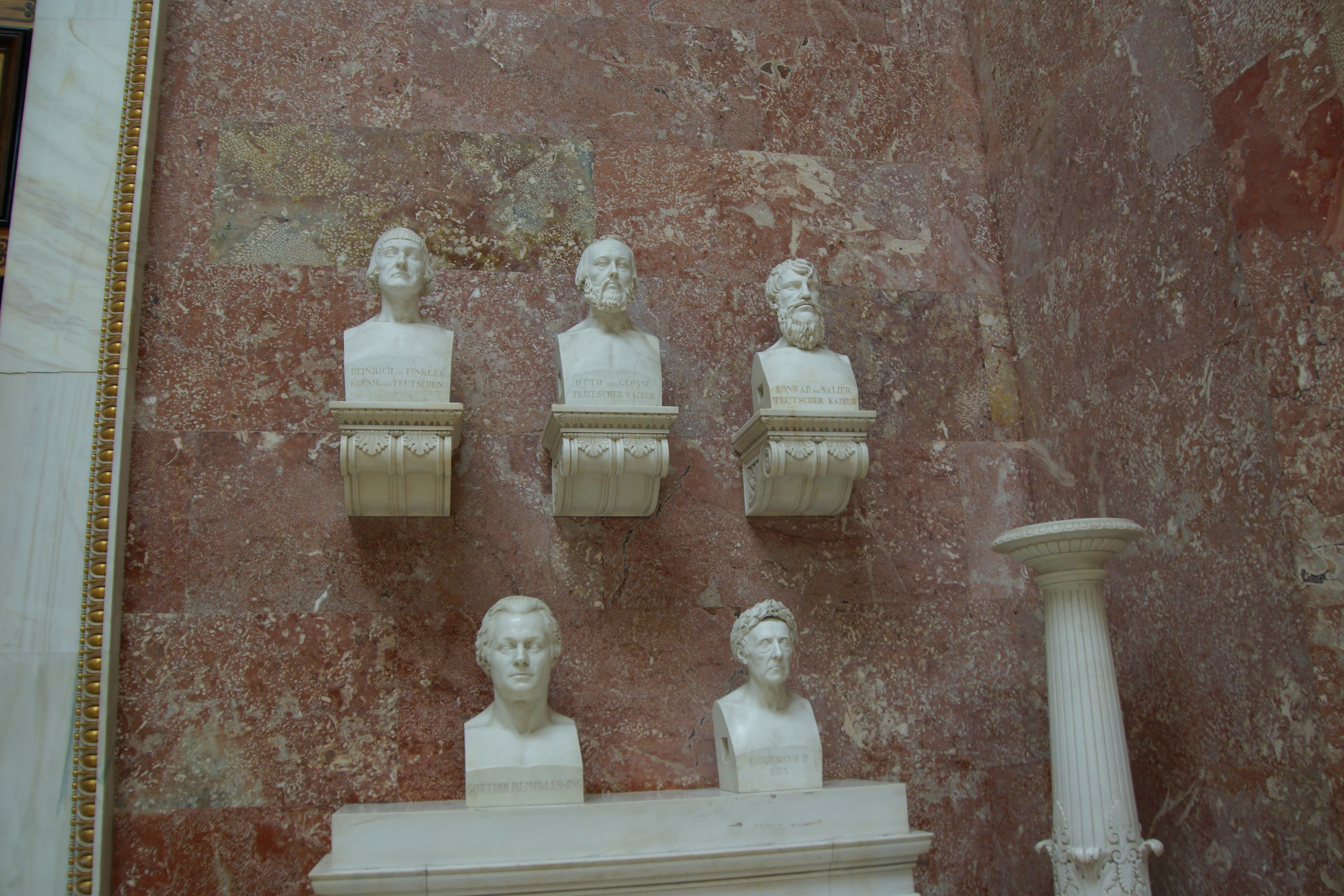
Conrad's bust in Walhalla (first row, right)

- A twelfth-century stained glass that shows Conrad and his son Henry III still exists in the Strasbourg Cathedral.
- Wilhelm Camphausen (1818–1885) made an engraving depicting Ernest of Swabia standing before Conrad after a rebellion.
- Kirchbach (1859–1912) made an engraving depicting Conrad's coronation procession.
- In the Walhalla, a Hall of Fame for German heroes built by Ludwig I of Bavaria, there is a bust of Conrad II sculpted by Johann Gottfried Schadow in 1810.
- Conrad's portrait by Lorenz Clasen (1840), is part of a series depicting emperors who reigned from 768 to 1806 (created from 1839 to 1853) in the Kaisersaal in Frankfurt am Main.
- In the Cathedral's Garden in Speyer, there are a group of statues representing the Salians (Gisela, Conrad II, Henry III, Henry IV, Henry V and secondary figures, created around 1930–1940 by Ludwig Cauer (sculptor, born 1866 in Bad Kreuznach, died 1947 in Bad Kreuznach) and commissioned by Wilhelm Frick, Reich Minister of the Interior.
- Also in the Cathedral's Garden in Speyer, the sculptor Günther Zeuner built the statue group Fährmann hol' über in 1987. The story behind the work is as the following: One cold and rainy night in October 1813, a ferryman was sleeping in his boat on the bank of the Rhine. At midnight, he was awakened by a shadowy figure.That figure told the ferryman that he wanted to be brought to the other side. When the ferryman was preparing his boat, other dark figures appeared and demanded the same.Then, as if by magic, the boat glided across the river carrying those strange figure to the other side. The ferryman afterwards thought that this was a dream, but there were gold coins with the likenesses of these figures in his hand – those were emperors buried in the Cathedral (among them Conrad), who had risen from their graves. Germany later defeated Napoleon's troops.

==== Theater ====
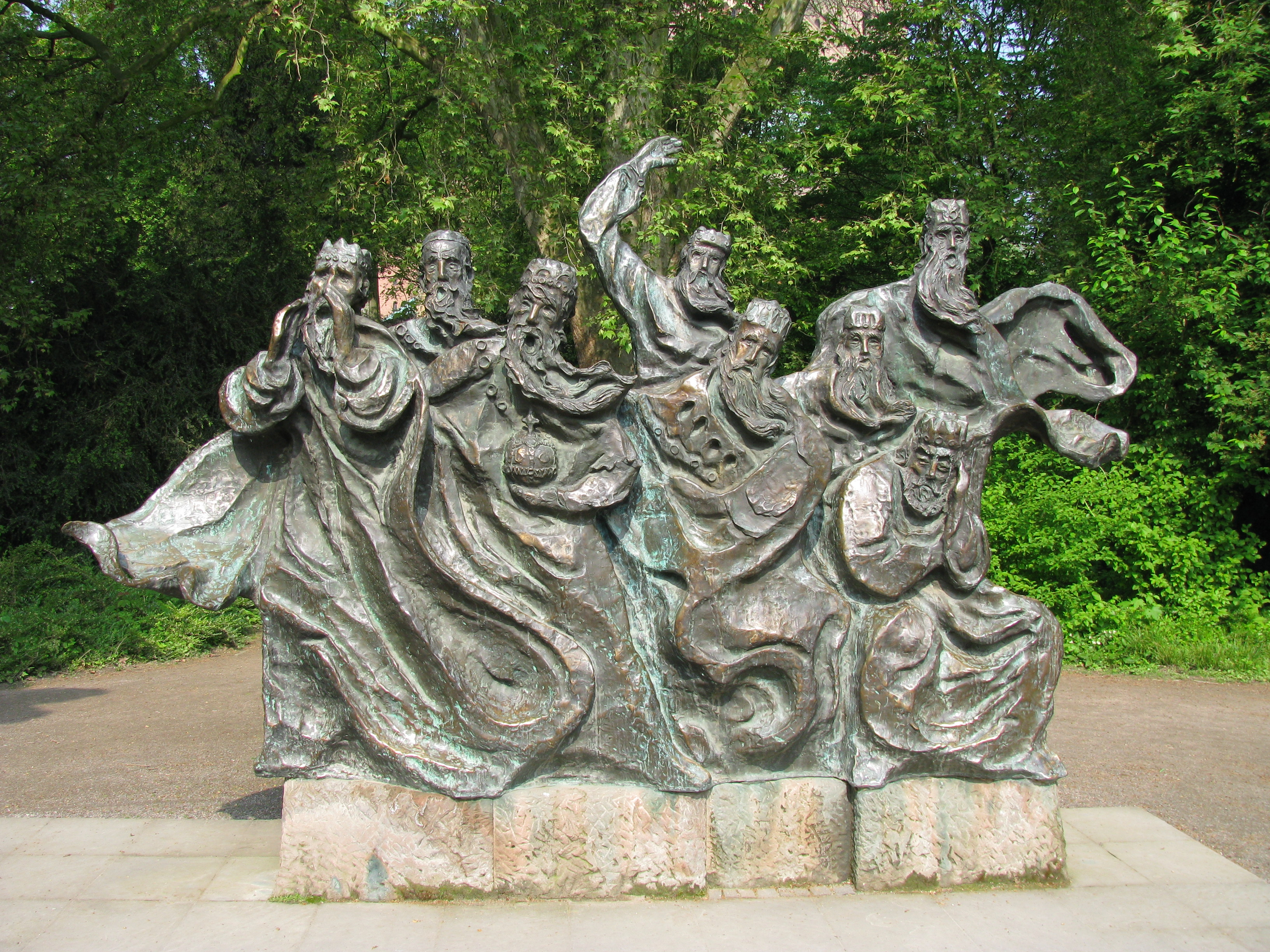
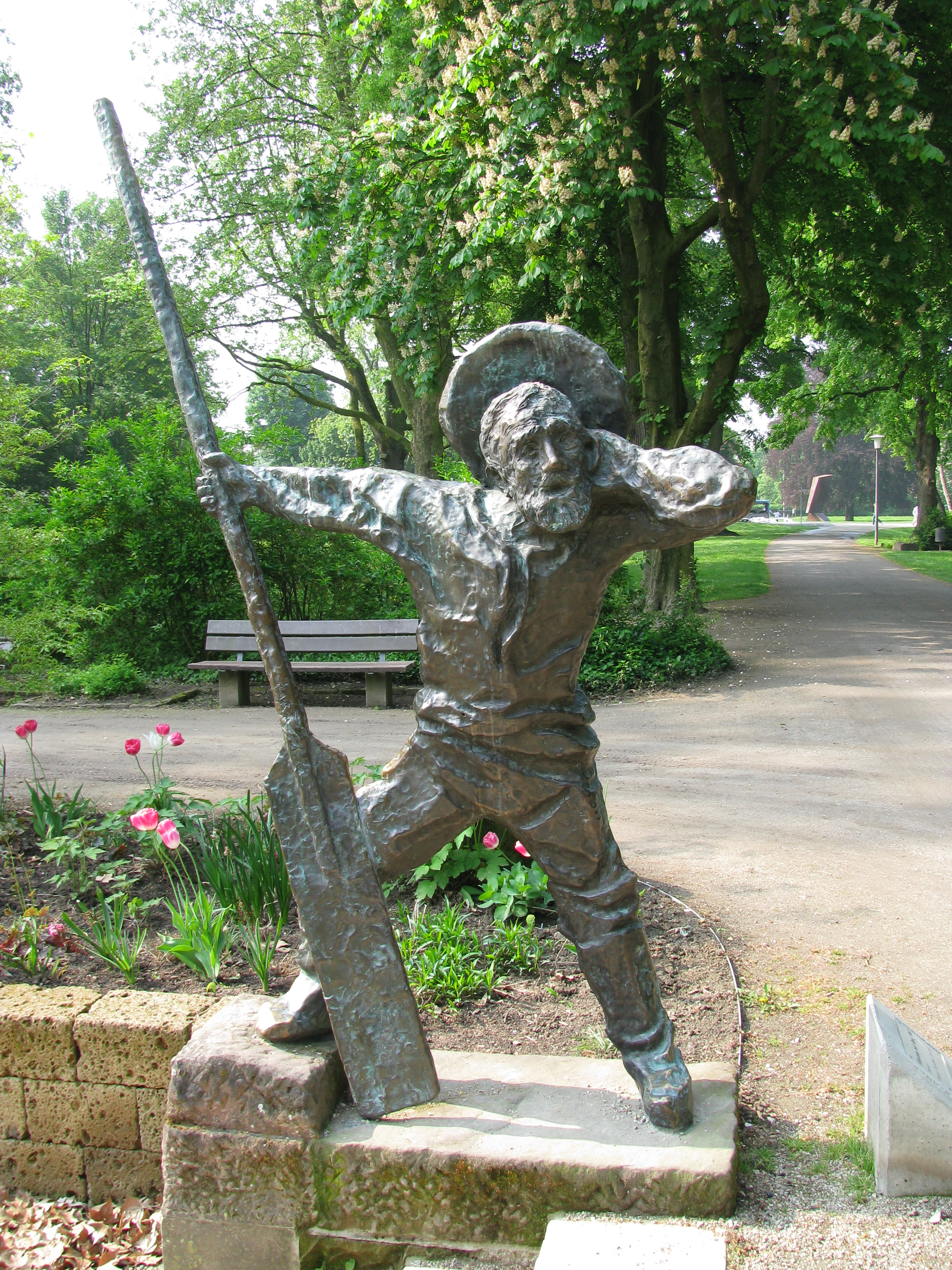
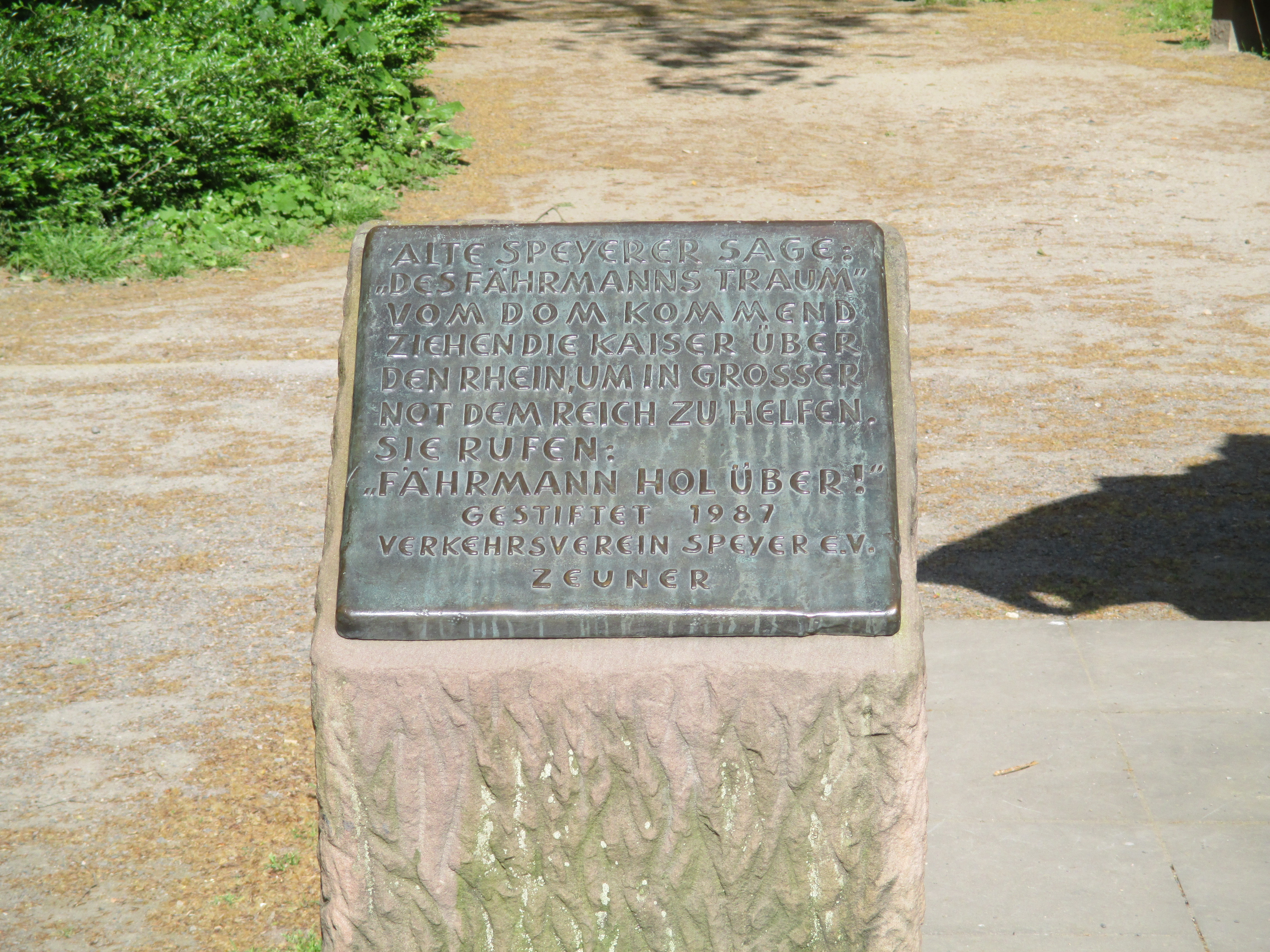
Eight emperors and kings calling out to the ferryman (Fährmann hol' über by Georg Günther Zeuner, 1987), Speyer Cathedral's garden.
- He is the ruler depicted in Ulrich von Destouches's five-act Der findling und die Kaisertochter.
- In 1818, Ludwig Uhland wrote the trauerspiel Ernst, Herzog Von Schwaben about the rebellion of Ernest II, Duke of Swabia. The story ends with Ernest becoming an outlaw under imperial ban, having refused to give up on his friend Werner of Kiburg despite his stepfather Conrad's promise of reinvesting him with the Duchy of Swabia.
- Albert Dulk wrote the six-act historical drama Konrad der Zweite.
- In 1928, Walter Lutz wrote the five-act Kaiser Konrad.

==== Poetry ====
- The famous Medieval narrative poem Herzog Ernst is about the rebellion of Ernest against Conrad. Here the story of Ernest and Conrad is mixed with the story of Liudolf and Otto I.

==== Prose ====
- Kaiser Konrad II.: Historische Erzählung aus dem Mittelalter (1887) is part of a series for young people, portraying German Middle Age history (Aus dem alten deutschen Reich, historische Erzählungen in romantischer Form für die Jugend, 12 Vol.) by Franz Heyer

== Commemoration ==
- The Speyer Cathedral usually commemorates him on the day of his death (4 June).

== See also ==
- Cultural depictions of Gisela of Swabia
- Cultural depictions of Otto I, Holy Roman Emperor
- Cultural depictions of Otto III, Holy Roman Emperor
- Cultural depictions of Frederick I, Holy Roman Emperor
- Cultural depictions of Frederick II, Holy Roman Emperor
- Cultural depictions of Charles IV, Holy Roman Emperor
- Cultural depictions of Sigismund, Holy Roman Emperor
- Cultural depictions of Maximilian I, Holy Roman Emperor
- Cultural depictions of Charles V, Holy Roman Emperor
