= Charles V Monument (Palermo) =

Charles V
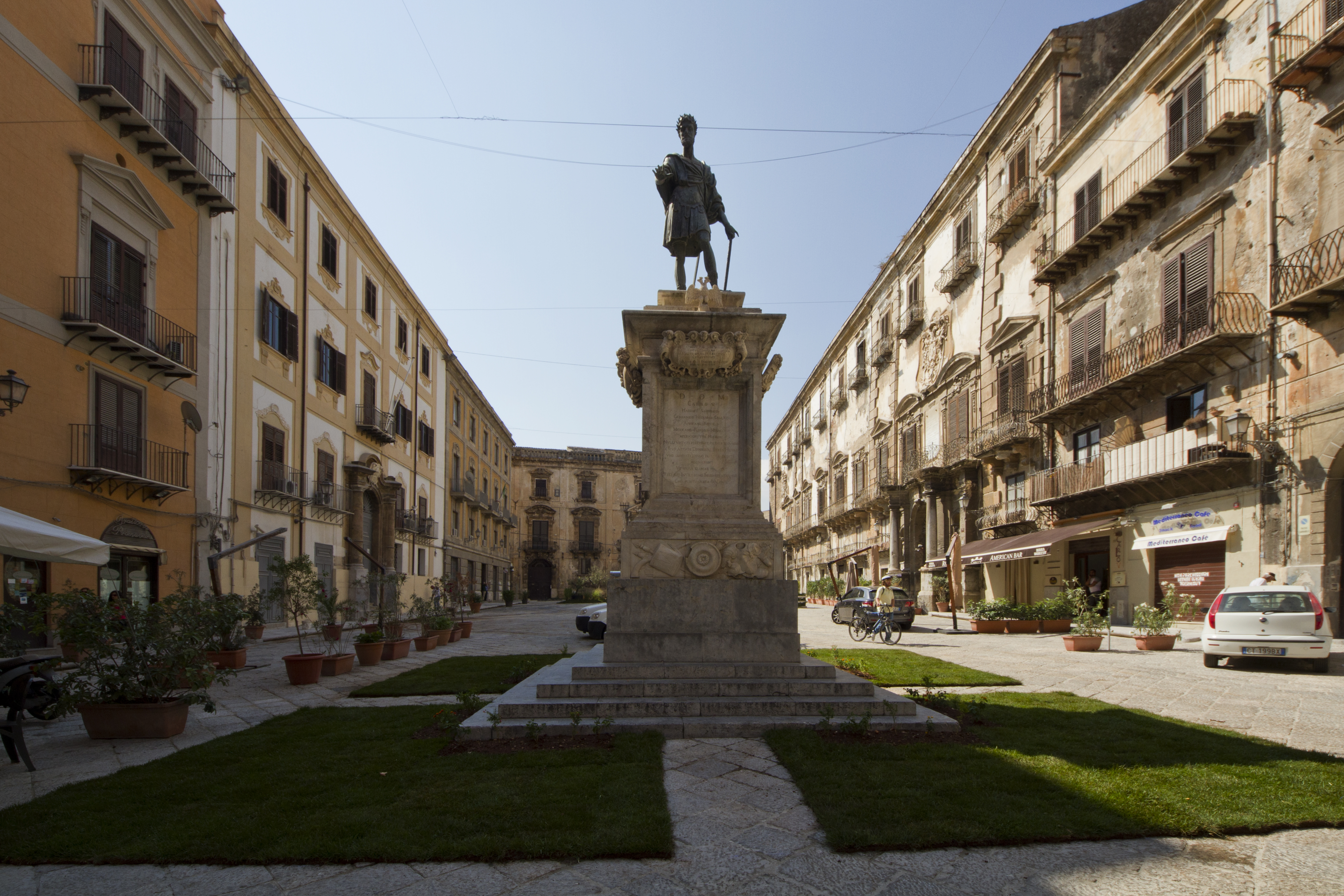
- Interactive map of Charles V
- Location: Piazza Bologni, Palermo
- Coordinates: 38°06′54″N 13°21′36″E
- Designer: Scipione Li Volsi
- Material: Bronze
- Dedicated date: 1631
- Dedicated to: Charles V

The Charles V Monument is a monumental sculpture erected in 1631 on Piazza Bologni in Palermo, Sicily. It was initially designed to be placed in the center of the Quattro Canti but was eventually erected in its current location. The statue of Charles V was created by Scipione Li Volsi of the Li Volsi family of Sicilian sculptors. It portrays him as a triumphant Roman Emperor, with reference to his months-long stop in Sicily (including Palermo) following the Conquest of Tunis (1535). The marble pedestal is by Giacomo Cirasolo and Luigi Geraci with sculptures by Giovanni Tagliavia. The Latin inscriptions praise Charles and compare him to "the brothers Robert [Guiscard] and Roger [first Count of Sicily]", who had brought an end to Muslim rule in Palermo in January 1072.
