= Jango Edwards =

American clown and entertainer (1950–2023)

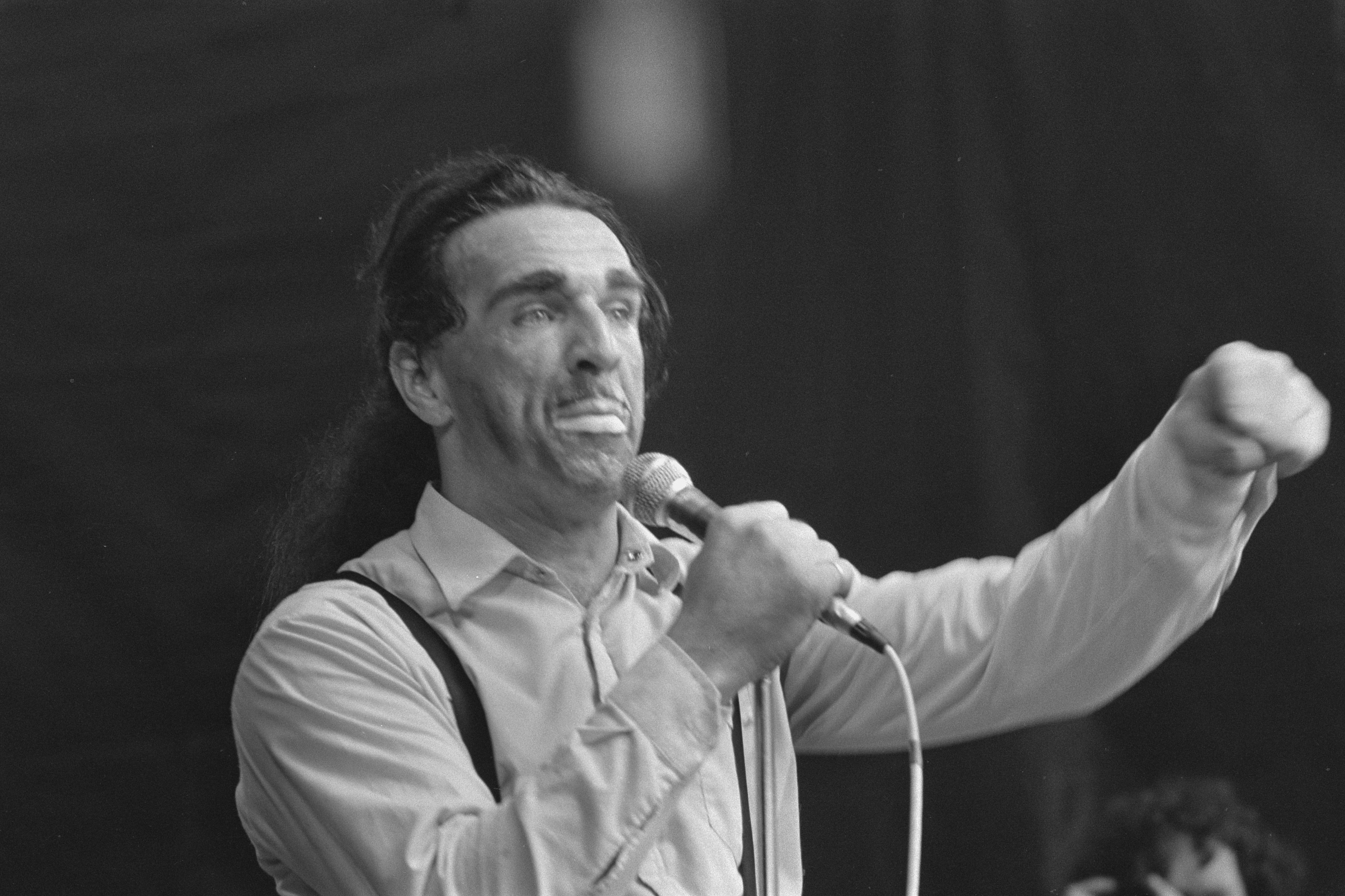
- Edwards in 1984
- Born: Stanley Ted Edwards; April 15, 1950; Detroit, Michigan, U.S.
- Died: August 3, 2023 (aged 73); Barcelona, Spain
- Occupation: Clown

Stanley Ted Edwards (April 15, 1950 – August 3, 2023), known professionally as Jango Edwards, was an American clown and entertainer who spent most of his career in Europe, primarily in France, Spain, the Netherlands, and England.

Edwards' performances were mainly one-man shows in the European cabaret tradition, in which he combined traditional clowning with countercultural and political references. Edwards built up a cult following over more than three decades of touring Europe with his shows.

== Biography ==
Stanley Ted Edwards was born in Detroit, Michigan, on April 15, 1950. His family owned a successful landscaping business. During the late 1960s, he became immersed in radical politics, philosophy, religion, and the esoteric sciences. After three trips to Europe, he decided to give up his possessions in the U.S. and to travel to Europe to study the art of comedy and the clown. He became a busker in London and formed traveling comedy groups there.

Beginning in 1975, he became known as one of the primary organizers and performers at the "International Festival of Fools", an occasional citywide festival of alternative comedy and clown acts in Amsterdam. Edwards gained a fan base in the Netherlands and for many years attracted enthusiastic audiences to his performances there. He also developed a fan base in Germany. From the 1980s, Edwards spent much of his time in France, where his style of performance was well received. For a time he gave regular performances at a small theater in the Pigalle district of Paris. Later he was based in Barcelona.

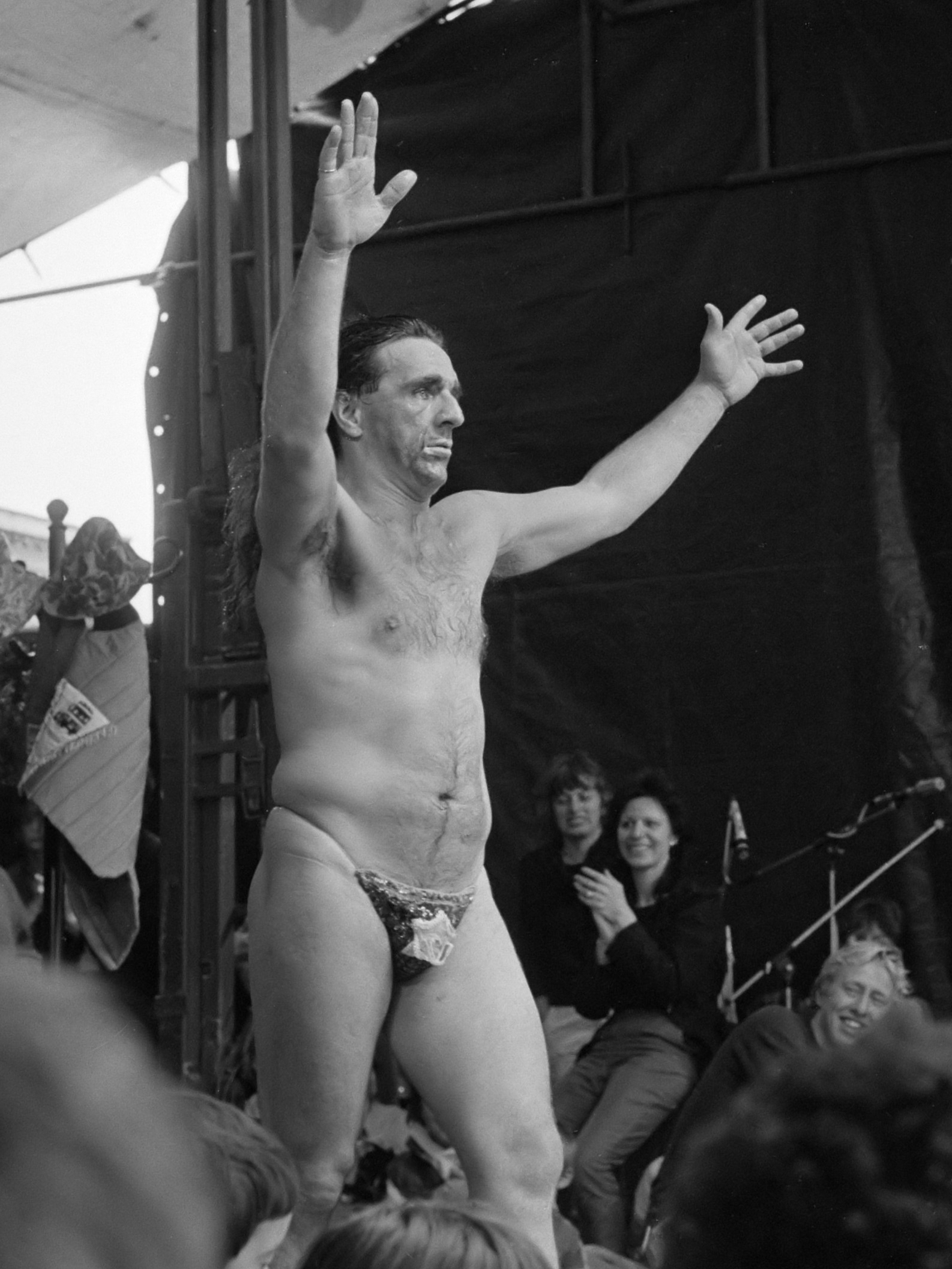
Edwards at Festival of Fools in Amsterdam, 1984

Between 1990 and 1998 he had several appearances on an Austrian comedy TV series called Tohuwabohu.

In 2004, he released a DVD compilation of live performances: Jango Edwards: The Best of Jango.

Edwards also recorded four audio albums: Live at the Melkweg (Milky Way Records LP 1978), Clown Power (Ariola LP 1980), Live in Europe (Polydor LP 1980), Holey Moley (Silenz CD 1991) and two books: Jango Edwards (written in English but with a cover in German) and I Laugh You (Rostrum Haarlem, 1984). The Clown Power album was a limited edition of 3000 copies, each with a different album cover.

In 2009 Edwards opened in Granollers, Barcelona, the "Nouveau Clown Institute" (NCI), a training center specializing in the world of clowning. Although the NCI has received no government or private funding, it has survived independently.

Jango Edwards died in Barcelona on August 4, 2023, at the age of 73.

== Bibliography ==
- "J comme Jango... Edwards", in Improvisation so piano, Jean-Pierre Thiollet, Neva Editions, 2017, p. 66-69. ISBN 978 2 35055 228 6
