= All Men Are Mortal =

1946 novel by Simone de Beauvoir

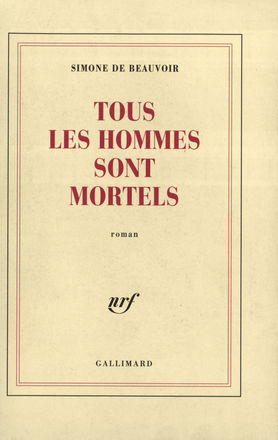
- Cover of the first edition
- Author: Simone de Beauvoir
- Original title: Tous les hommes sont mortels
- Language: French
- Genre: Metaphysical novel
- Publication date: 1946
- Publication place: France
- Media type: Print (Hardback & Paperback)

First US edition (publ. The World Publishing Company)

All Men Are Mortal (French: Tous les hommes sont mortels) is a 1946 novel by Simone de Beauvoir. It tells the story of Raimon Fosca, a man cursed to live forever. The first American edition of this work was published by The World Publishing Company. Cleveland and New York, 1955. It was adapted into a 1995 film of the same name.

== Plot ==
The beautiful, successful, but also vain and egotistical actress Regine meets the strange Italian Raymond Fosca in France in the 1930s. At first he is reluctant to make her acquaintance, but then he seems to fall in love with Regine and soon reveals his secret to her: he is immortal. Regine does not understand the dimension of this revelation and at first only thinks about how she herself could attain immortality through the Romance with him - in his memory. Fosca then withdraws from her, but when she seeks him out and confronts him, he tells her his story.

Born the son of a patrician in the (fictional) 13th-century northern Italian town of Carmona, the world presents itself to Fosca as a mixture of violence and intrigue: While in the city the influential families fight for supremacy, this struggle is repeated in the outside world as a permanent state of war between the city-states and small states of Italy at the time and their ever-changing constellations of alliances. Neither the respective rulers nor their subjects achieve any real progress. Fosca gets the impression that these battles only go on endlessly because neither party has the time to permanently consolidate the power and rule it has won - and so the desire arises in him for a life that will last forever and thus give him the decisive advantage. In return for his pardon, he receives a magic potion from a beggar in his hometown who has been sentenced to death. After trying it on a mouse, he drinks it himself and promptly becomes immortal - but the hoped-for success does not materialize. Again and again a new opponent rises up; even his own son (when he has long since become an adult and wants to inherit the regency from his father) finally fights him, and Fosca kills him himself. Despite this, he does not want to give up and initially fights on for two centuries, but never gets beyond his role as lord of the city of Carmona.

Outside Italy, however, the world had changed during this time, and when a new, influential warlord appeared in Italy in the form of the Habsburg Maximilian I, Fosca had the idea of putting his forces at the service of a successful ruler rather than trying any longer to become one himself. He leaves his hometown, for which he has fought for so long, to the Habsburgs and serves as an advisor to Maximilian and later to his son Philip and his grandson Charles V. At the imperial court, he finds that the same old intrigues for power and influence are being spun here, too, without the people necessarily being better off as a result. On the contrary, on a journey to the American colonies, Fosca is made vividly aware of all the misery of the inhabitants of this seemingly glamorous empire. He flees from this realization into the wilderness of North America.

There, by chance, Fosca meets the adventurer Pierre Carlier, who succeeds in infecting him with his joy of discovery: The young man has set himself the ambitious goal of traveling to China and, on his way there, becoming the first European to cross the North American continent to the Pacific Ocean. Fosca joins him. Thanks to his immortality, he saves his new friend several times from dicey situations, but they get no closer to their goal. The adventurer eventually dies, and Fosca's search for further discoveries is thus spoiled. He retreats to the natives for several generations.

Tracked down there, he ends up in absolutist Paris carrying with him riches he acquired in North America. In the decadent circles of the nobility there, he first becomes a ruthless gambler who outplays all opponents and cannot be killed even in a duel - but this behavior does not provide him with lasting distraction. He begins to take an interest in science and rises to become a renowned chemist. As a result, he first wins the affection of young Marianne, who maintains an intellectual salon. He falls in love and marries her, but almost loses her when she finds out his secret. And he, for all his love, does not really understand her, for her actions and motives are those of a mortal, and Fosca is literally "free" of such motives, whereas no one else understands his ever-increasing fear of infinity, which no amount of activity can permanently subdue. As long as Marianne lives, Fosca clings to her, but he becomes increasingly aware of the insurmountable contrast with his fellow human beings, and becomes more and more indifferent to life. After Marianne's death, he finally abandons his scientific interests.

In the Paris of the July Revolution of 1830, Fosca is able to take an interest in the new trends of the time for a last time, partly because one of the revolutionaries is a descendant of his. But as before, he sees in the latter's efforts to improve people's lives mainly the recurring failure. He does not find any consolation for his personal fate in this either. Not even the love of the revolutionary Laure can reach him now. So one day he marches out of the city and lies down in the forest to sleep for sixty years. When he is found, he is not believed and is taken to a mental asylum.

When Fosca finishes his story, he tells that he suffers from nightmares in which the whole world is white and dead, populated only by two living beings: he and the mouse on which he tested the immortality potion. Regine finally understands the enormity of his fate; but she also realizes that she means nothing to him. Fosca still gives her cold comfort, saying that for her it will pass. Then he goes away.

The main tension exists between the meaninglessness of daily life, rituals, style from the perspective of an immortal man contrasted by the seeming trivial concerns of a mortal woman: the importance and the value they put on things are at opposite ends of the spectrum. From his perspective everything is essentially the same. From her perspective even the most trivial is unique and carries significance.

== See also ==
- The Wandering Jew, a series of old legends about a Jew who is made immortal in the time of Jesus and cursed to wander the Earth until the second coming.
