= Vienna Coronation Gospels =

8th-century illuminated manuscript

Coordinates: 48°12′24″N 16°21′56″E

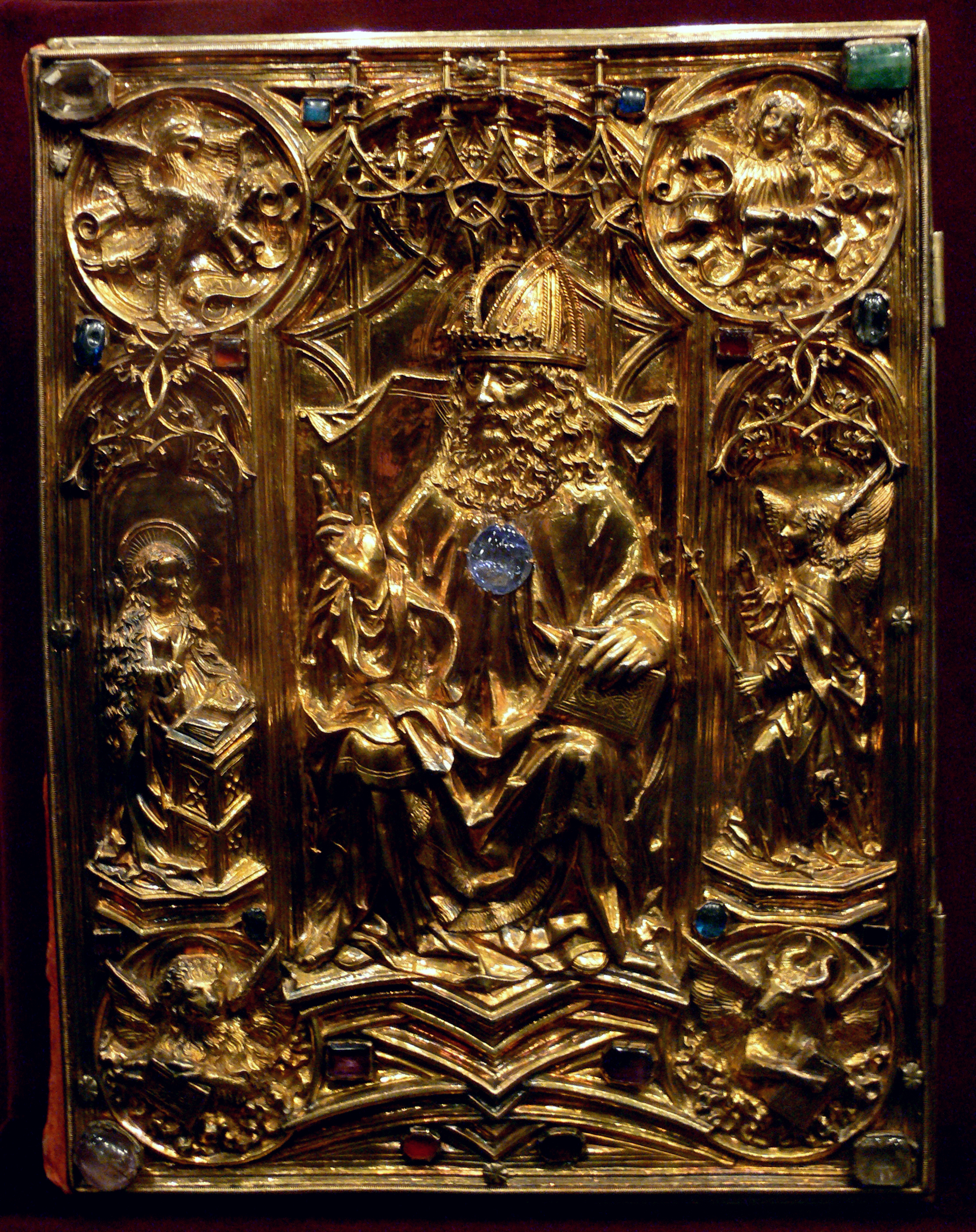
Coronation Evangeliar cover by Hans von Reutlingen, c. 1500

The Vienna Coronation Gospels, also known simply as the Coronation Gospels (German: Krönungsevangeliar), is a late 8th century illuminated gospel book produced at the court of Charlemagne in Aachen. It was used by the future emperor at his coronation on Christmas Day 800, when he placed three fingers of his right hand on the first page of the Gospel of Saint John and took his oath. Traditionally, it is considered to be the same manuscript that was found in the tomb of Charlemagne when it was opened in the year 1000 by Emperor Otto III. The Coronation Evangeliar cover was created by Hans von Reutlingen, c. 1500. The Coronation Evangeliar is part of the Imperial Treasury (Schatzkammer) in the Hofburg Palace in Vienna, Austria (Schatzkammer, Inv. XIII 18).

== History ==
The Coronation Evangeliar is the principal work among a small group of manuscripts produced at the court of Charlemagne at Aachen, some time between 794 and late 800.

== Description ==
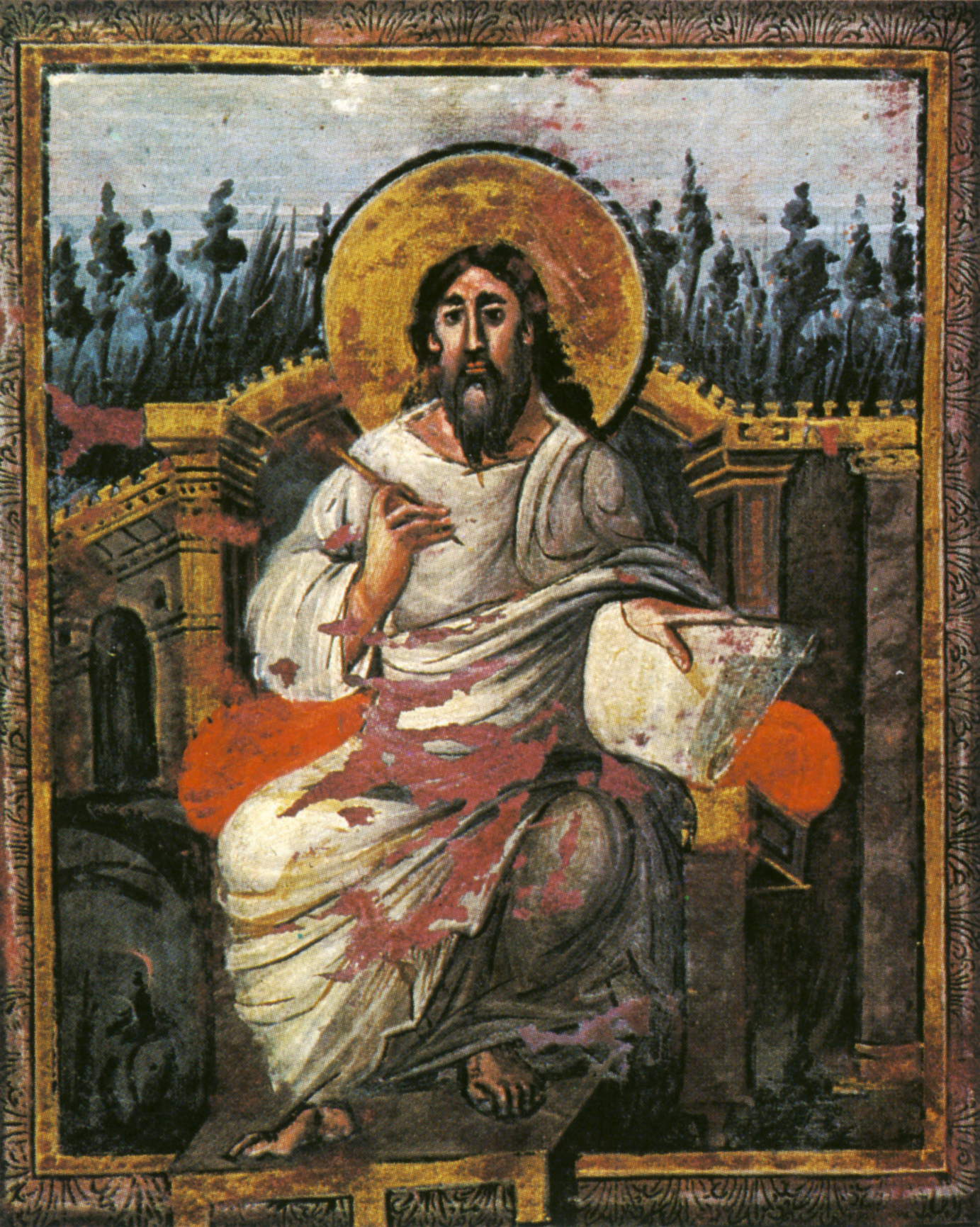
Coronation Evangeliar portrait of Saint John

=== Manuscript ===
The Coronation Evangeliar manuscript consists of 236 crimson-dyed parchment pages with gold and silver ink text. The pages measure 32.4 cm × 24.9 cm (12.8 in × 9.8 in), and contain text presented in one column, 26 lines per page. The incipit page of each Gospel shows the three writing styles common to valuable illustrated manuscripts from the late antique period—the capitalis rustica of the first line, followed by the monumental capitalis quadrata of the second line, which introduces the Latin text of the Gospel in gold ink, which is presented in continuous uncial script with no spaces between the words or punctuation.

The book is decorated with 16 plates and four portraits depicting the Evangelists—one at the start of each Gospel. The portrait paintings are in a Carolingian style derived from Byzantine art. In the margin of the first page of the Gospel of Luke the Greek name Demetrius presbyter is written in gold capital letters. This may be the signature of the scribe or illuminator and may indicate that there were Byzantine artists in the court of Charlemagne.

=== Cover ===
The Coronation Evangeliar cover was created by the goldsmith Hans von Reutlingen of Aachen c. 1500. Designed in high relief, the gold cover shows God the Father seated in front of the canopy of his throne. His left hand is closed over the Bible, and his right hand is raised in a gesture of blessing directed at Mary, who is shown grasping her heart during the Annunciation. The right side of the cover shows the Angel of the Annunciation. God the Father is dressed in imperial vestments and wearing a mitre crown, similar to the one worn by Maximilian I, who was Holy Roman Emperor at the time the cover was produced. The four corners of the front cover are decorated with four medallions bearing symbols of the Four Evangelists.

== See also ==
- Cultural depictions of Otto III, Holy Roman Emperor
