= Cultural depictions of Sigismund, Holy Roman Emperor =

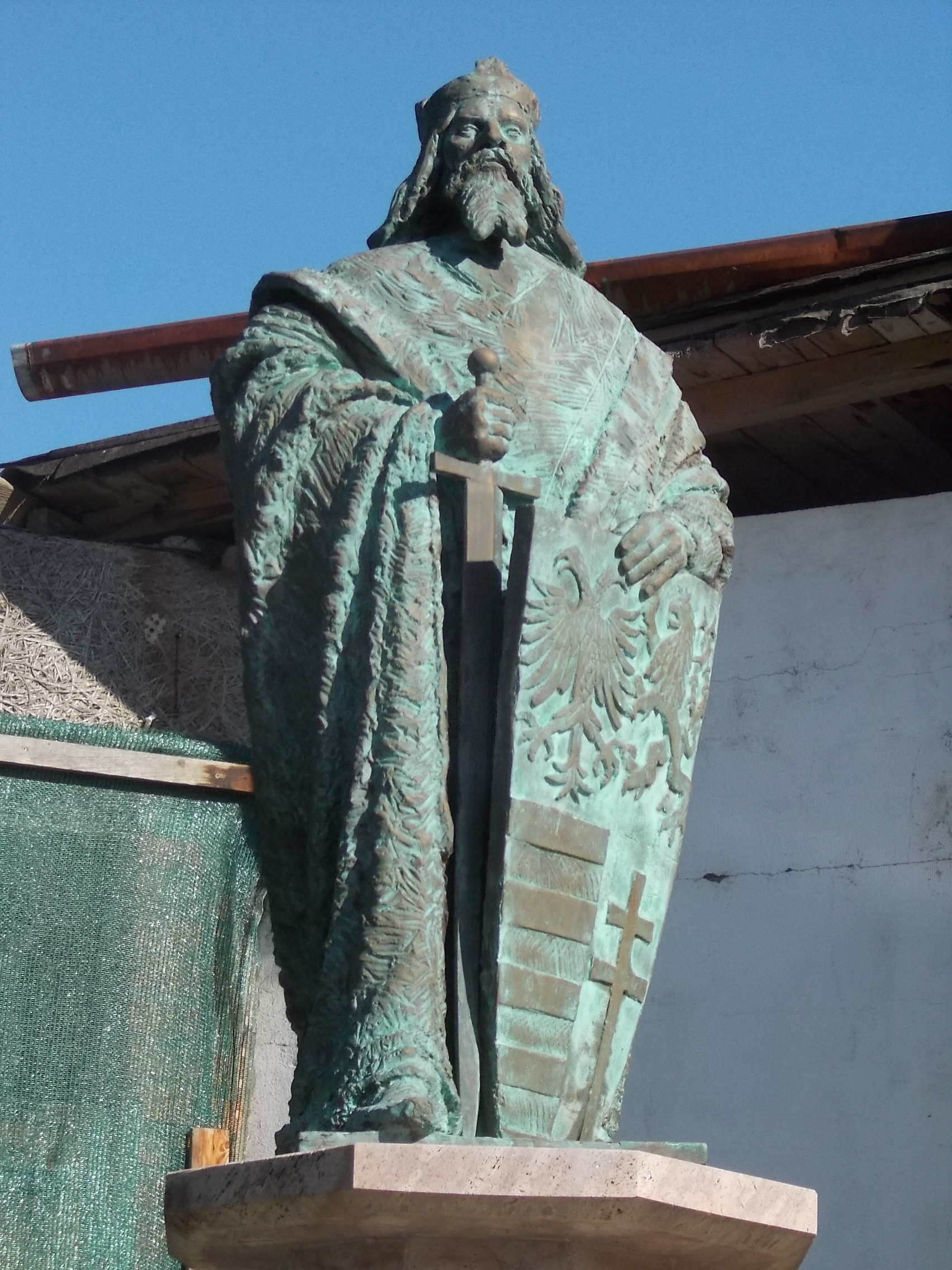
Statue of Sigismund by Péter Gáspár (2003) in the Europe Place, Komárno

Sigismund, Holy Roman Emperor, from the House of Luxembourg, was the holder of five European royal crowns (Germany, Hungary, Croatia, Bohemia, Italy, thus an "imperial association" stretching "from the North and Baltic Seas to the Mediterranean and the Black Seas") in his lifetime and played an important role in the history of East-Central Europe. For a long time though, technical difficulties like linguistic barriers, misunderstandings caused by lack of materials and political conditions made Sigismund unattractive as a research subject for historians. His morality has also been regarded as questionable, especially concerning his relationship with the Hussites. Modern historiography now generally considers him a determined, capable and visionary ruler, though not without mistakes and undesirable traits. In Hungary and Czechia in particular, his image as a ruler and cultural figure has improved.

== Historiography ==
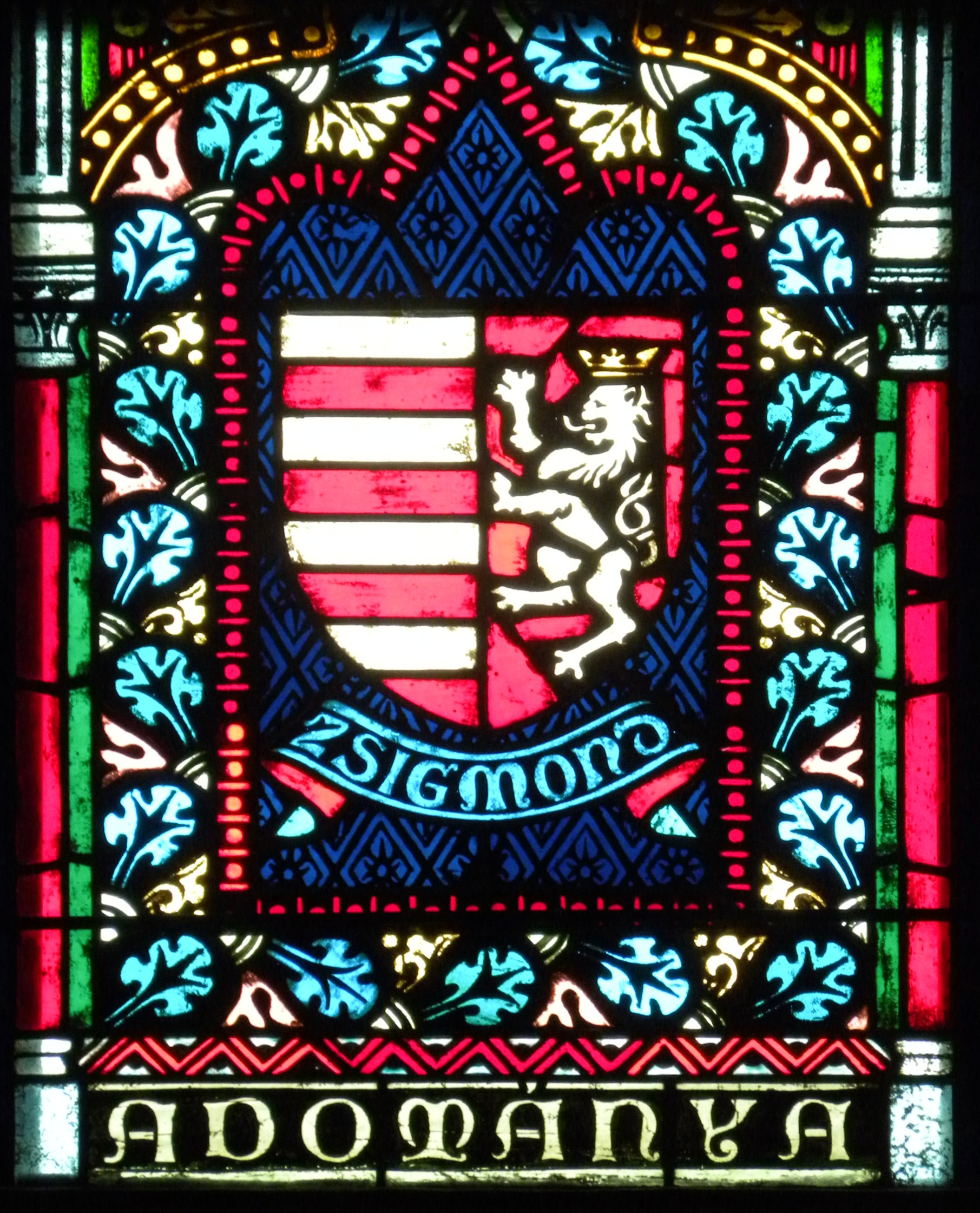
Coat-of-arms of Sigismund (Matthias Church in Budapest)

According to historian Ansgar Frenken, for a long time, Sigismund was not even considered a subject worthy of his own field of research, due to both the lack of resonance in the public and scholarly circles, as well as technical difficulty (studying the polyglot emperor, who himself was fluent in six languages, requires skills in Latin, German, Polish, Czech, Hungarian and more). The Germans considered him, although a successful "crown collector", an unsuccessful ruler with unrealistic utopian plans and little strength in times of need. The Hungarians associated him with the loss of access to the Mediterranean and little success in controlling the Turkish threat. His image was even worse in Czech, where he was considered an usurper and traitor who brought Jan Hus to the stake, and the enemy of the Hussites, who have become the object of national identification from the nineteenth century onwards. In Germany during the nineteenth century, only Joseph von Aschbach offered a notable study, and only a century and a half later did the researcher Jörg K. Hoensch write another scientifically qualified biography (1997). In Hungary, already in 1984, in Elemér Mályusz produced an important study (later translated as Kaiser Sigismund in Ungarn, 1387-1437 in German) but it hardly found any international response. For multiple reasons, the elaborate exhibition "Emperor Sigismund and his time in the arts", organized in 1987 by the Budapest History Museum (Budapesti Történeti Múzeum) in collaboration with the Institute for Art History (Hungarian Academy of Sciences), was met with little resonance too.

Only with the fall of the Berlin Wall, the mobility between Eastern Europe and Western Europe, the process of European integration and the efforts of German Bohemists like Peter Moraw and Ferdinand Seibt did the situation change. Sigismund's reign in Hungary has been reexamined and now considered largely successful. Even if his reputation is overshadowed by those of Matthias Corvinus and the Angevin kings, it is recognized that this great ruler made the country, especially Buda, the centre of a Europe-wide empire and transformed it into a vibrant cultural center. New perspectives allow changes also in historiography on his career in Bohemia and even the struggle with the Hussites. With very limited resources and scope of action, no real Hausmacht ("domestic power") in Germany and little help from the Electors, it was hardly possible for Sigismund to get any better results. The Czech historian Josef Válka observes that from an "implacable enemy", Sigismund is now understood as "one of the most important and interesting rulers of this period".

Jorg K.Hoensch presents Sigismund as a ruler who made the most out of his situation – lacking resources and facing constant advances of his enemies, he maintained his authority and gained respect from opponents, except the Czechs. He gained control of Hungary, ended the Great Schism with the Council of Constance, attained the imperial coronation in Rome and got accepted as king of Bohemia. Eltis David notes that Hoensch fairly assesses "Sigismund's many failings, ranging from unpunctuality to dishonesty", and also "his failure to produce a workable system for maintaining the public peace in Germany and to provide a lasting and effective defensive system against the Turks."

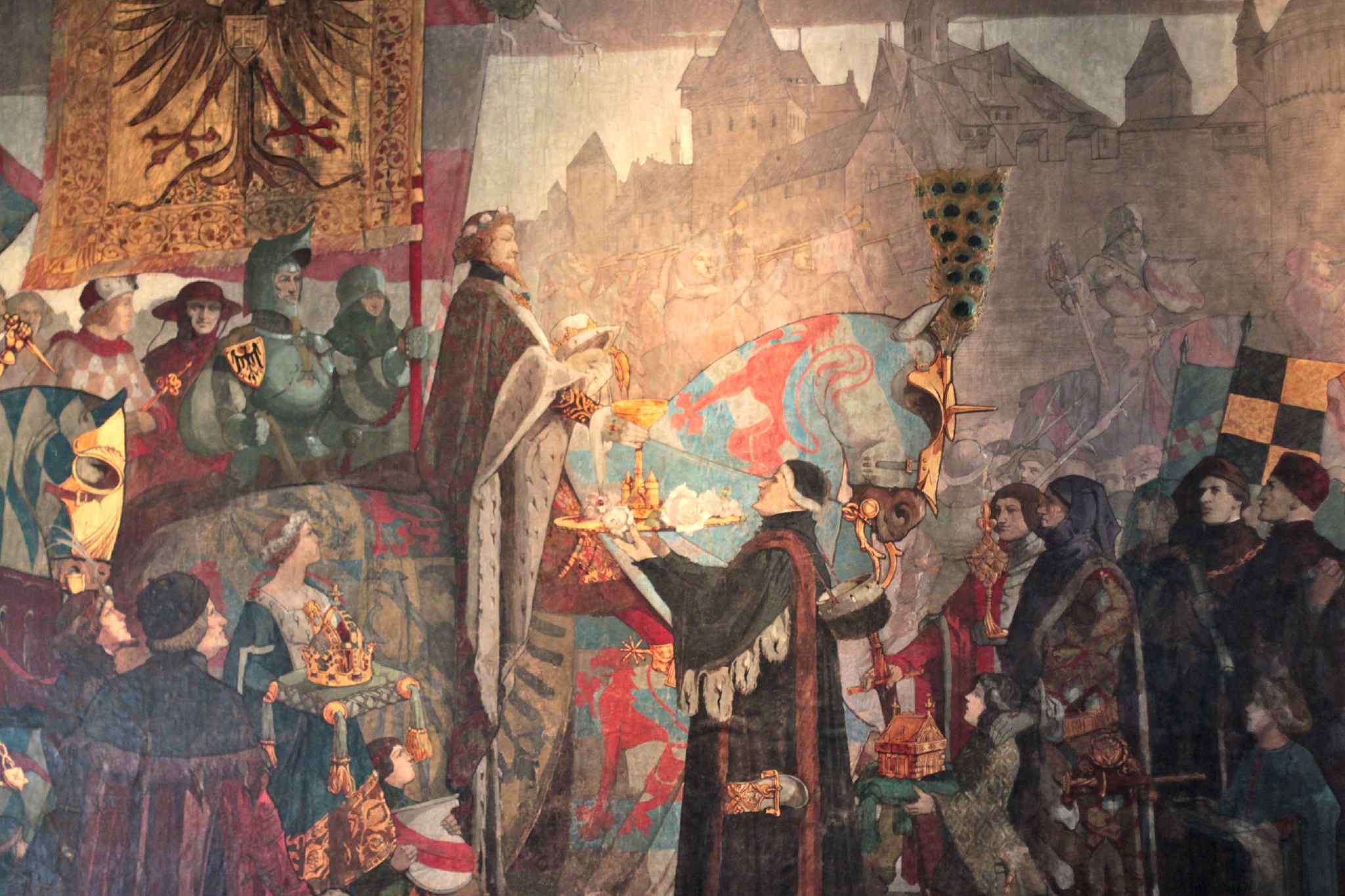
Entrée solennelle de l'empereur Sigismond à Strasbourg en 1414 by Leo Schnug

Mályusz examines the evolution of societal structure at the turning point between the 14th and 15th centuries in relations with the evolution of power balance between the king and the barons. Starting with a precarious position as king (he only gained the throne with help from other Luxembourg family members, having been opposed by Mary, her mother and a number of the greats), Sigismund tried to liberate himself from the tutelage of the barons by choosing as his advisors people outside these circles (like Stibor, a Pole, or Eberhard, a Rhenish, which caused dissatisfaction among the barons, but by marrying Barbara of Cilli and using marital alliances to gain the support of Nicholas II Garai, he managed to defeat the League of Kaniszai in 1403. In the later half in his reign, with the Order of the Dragon, he managed to bring the barons together while at the same time opening up the route of civil service for people of both noble and bourgeois descent. In his foreign relations, even though he lost the Dalmatian coast to the Venetians, he succeeded in building diplomatic relationships with peoples east of the Ottoman Empire and thus forced the Ottomans to concentrate on protecting their eastern provinces instead of invasion plans directed at Hungary. He was also an important actor in cultural life, even though he neglected literary patronage in favour of architecture and decorative arts, which leads Mályusz to the reflection that he deprived himself of the best way of self immortalization. Michèle Populer praises Mályusz's work for opening up a wealth of information especially for readers not familiar with the Hungarian language and historical context, but criticizes the author on some questions, notably regarding the effects of Sigismund's economic management and the baron's fiscal practices on commoners.

Thomas Brady Jr. praises the emperor's vision especially regarding the reform project for both the Church and the Empire, but criticizes him for making too many mistakes, especially in Bohemia: "In August 1436, King Sigismund, now seventy years old, rode into Prague for the first time since 1420. Even in victory he made a mistake typical of his regnal style. His vengeful execution of rebel hold-outs sealed Sigismund's reputation as "the murderer of the Czechs." Three months later, death relieved King Sigismund, "elected by divine providence to be a head of Christendom", from the torture of gout. He was the last of tens of thousands of dead from the wars his political folly had begun. Pursuant to his orders, the king-emperor's body, clad in Imperial robes and crown, sat on the throne for three days, so that all could see that the world had lost its rightful lord. With him ended the Luxemburg line and its Imperial project. As for his opponents, during the following 180 years no king could rule against the Bohemian nobles' will. Under their leadership and because of their victory, Bohemia had become a kingdom ruled by king and estates, among which the nobles had the preponderant voice. When this outcome was next threatened, generations later, it led to war."

Duncan Hardy opines that the late medieval Empire as governed by Sigismund, similar in many respect to the early modern Empire, "can be understood as a world of personal relationships framed and maintained by symbolic communication and conventional and negotiatory institutions and associations", in which the emperor proved a master at staging performative and representational communication: "More generally, as we have seen, Sigismund's name and features were embedded in the collective memory of many different communities in the Holy Roman Empire as symbols of the imperial monarchy at its most energetic and impressive. If he was sometimes noted for his vengeful and deceitful manner and his perpetual impecuniousness, Sigismund nonetheless achieved a kind of posthumous immortalization as the epitome of a charismatic Roman king and emperor. His charismatic reputation was unparalleled amongst later medieval monarchs, at least before Maximilian I and the explosion of new media which facilitated that ruler's propagandistic program of self-representation."

He was a brave and accomplished knight, who spoke seven languages. Military-wise, he was not exceptionally talented himself but had an eye for talents, and he rewarded good service and loyalty well. One of his most important supporters was Albert of Habsburg, who married Sigismund's daughter Elizabeth of Luxembourg and became his heir. The others included the Hungarian hero John Hunyadi and especially the Italian military leader and financial expert Pippo Spano (Filippo Scolari), who he acquired in Florence and would become a lifelong intimate.

== Legends and anecdotes ==
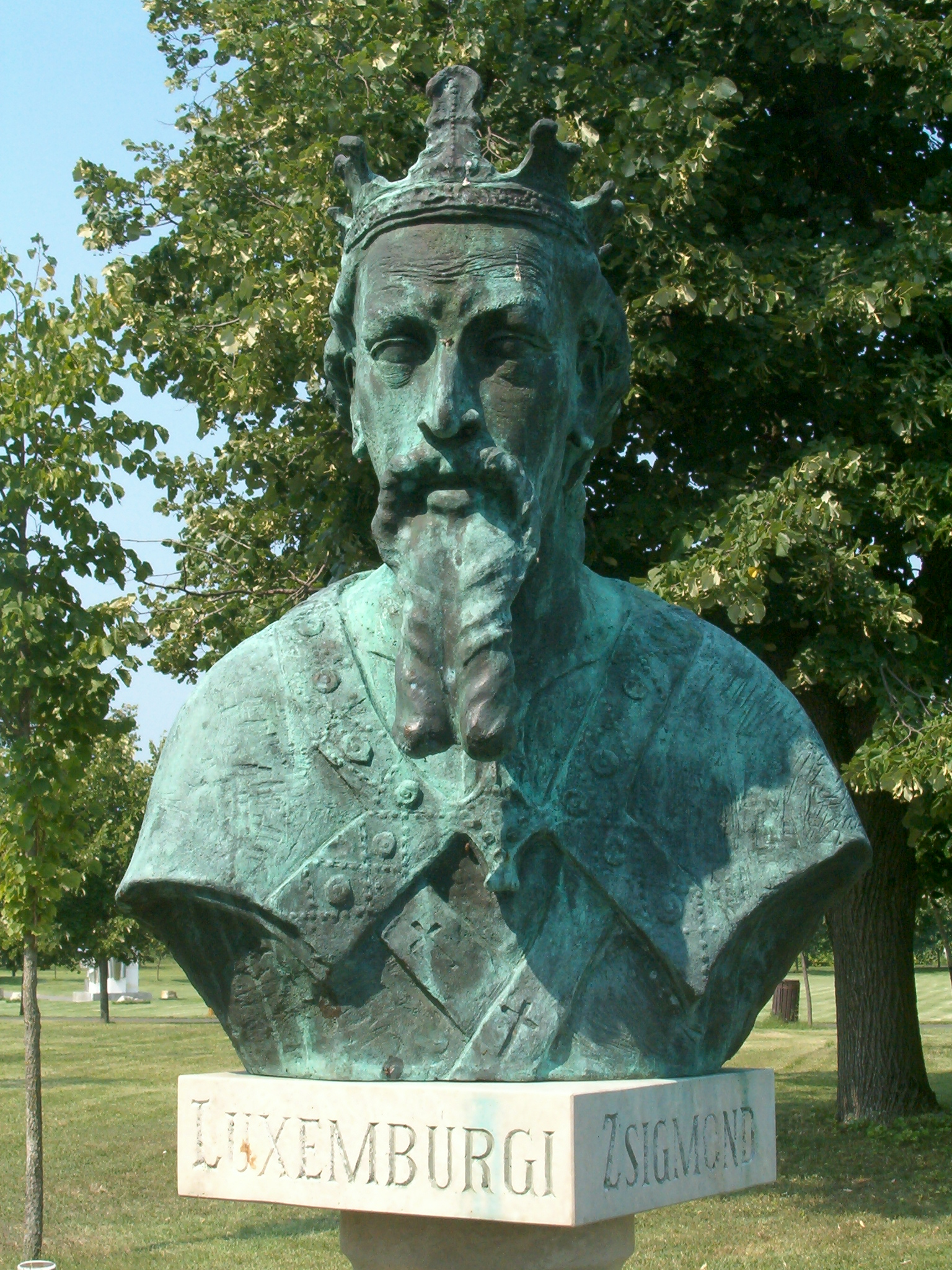
Sigismund by the sculptor Attila Bobály, Ópusztaszer National Heritage Park, Hungary.

- The name Dracul (associated with the Dracula legend) traces back to Sigismund's Order of the Dragon. Vlad II Dracul was an important vassal of Sigismund and member of this order.
- The term "Bohemian" used to reference the Gypsies is related to Sigismund. In 1417, he gave Ladislas, a Gypsy "voivode" travelling with a group of around a hundred people, a letter of safe conduct and his patronage. As Sigismund was King of Bohemia, gypsies travelling to another place via that realm were called Bohemians.
- There is a story about a Gypsy called Duke Andrew: "He said he was a landowner in Hungary who had converted to Islam. His lands had then been confiscated by the King of Hungary. He had returned to Christianity and been rebaptised in 1415 after a meeting with King Sigismund of Bohemia, together with 4,000 other Gypsies. The King had told him that he and his followers should travel for seven years as a penance, visit the Pope and then return to their lands. According to the chronicler, Andrew said the King had given them permission to take what they needed to live on from the general population during their travels. Andrew may well have gone to Rome and received a letter of safe conduct from the Pope or from someone in the Vatican on behalf of the Pope. He certainly reached Bologna in Italy within reach of Rome. He later said that the Pope had imposed a further seven years of wandering, but this time, rather than confiscating property, they were to be supported with gifts from the clergy in the various places they travelled through." The story probably has its roots in the Indian legend of the Sun and the Moon, who were brother and sister determined to marry each other and thus punished by having to chase after each other forever. The Gypsies are like them, having fallen from a high place and been subject to the fate of wandering endlessly because of their sins.
- The Polish poet Klemens Janicki (or Clemens Ianicius) recounts that Sigismund greatly favoured learned men: this was even described as "his only fault in life, in the opinion of all" ('Cuius id unum / In vita, vulgo iudice, crimen erat'). As he treated learned men as a father would his sons and always wanted them to be by his side, this angered the nobles, who proclaimed that their emperor should not be devoted to "such people, most of whom come from insignificant homes and whom a poor mother nursed in some unknown place" ('Quales parva domus gignit plerumque parensque / Lactat in obscuro non opulenta loco'). The emperor replied that, 'These people to whom nature and God gave a genius greater than mine and yours I place above all others. I esteem them according to their virtues. Why do I have to know where they were born?'."

== Depictions in arts ==
=== Arts under Sigismund ===
==== Architecture ====
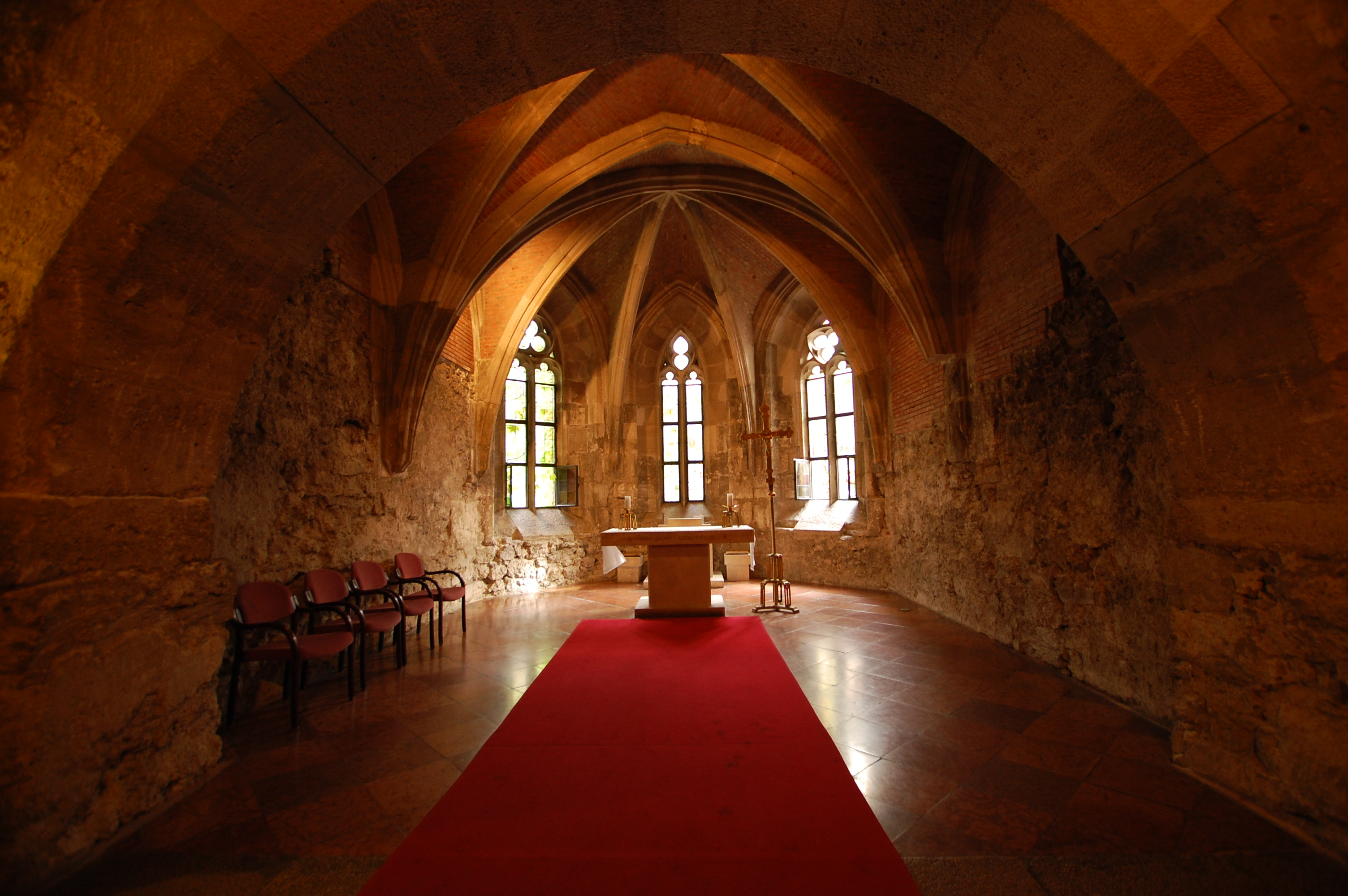
The Palace chapel inside the Buda castle

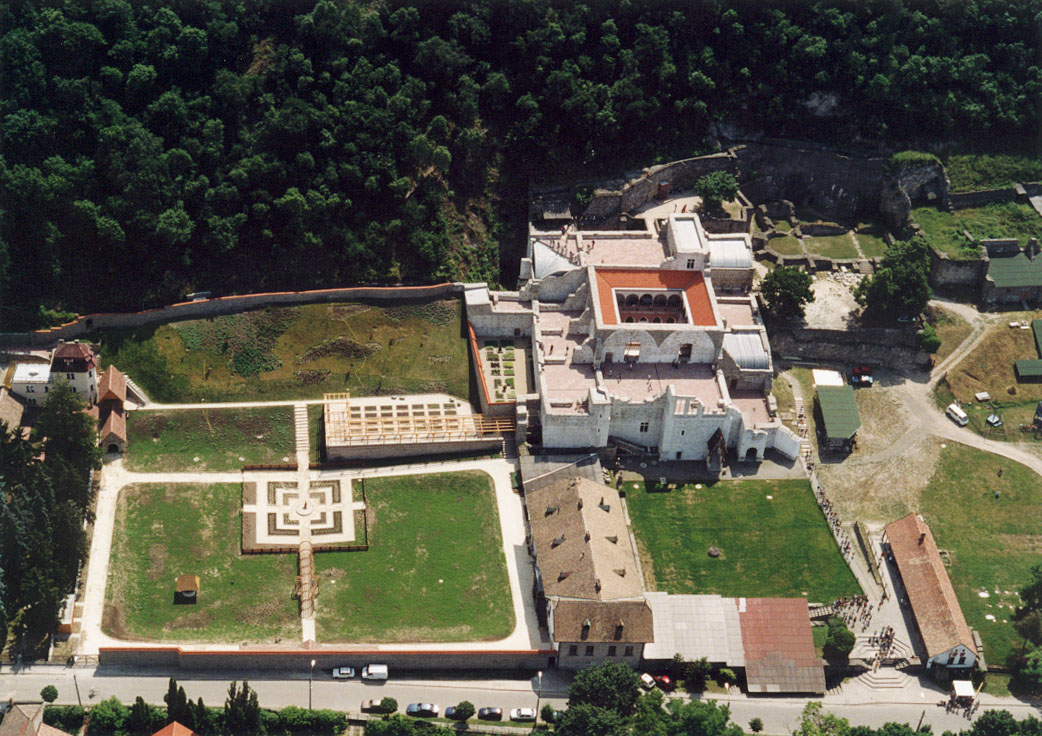
Visegrád - Royal Palace, including the ruins of Sigismund's era

Sigismund was a passionate builder, but much of the architecture built during his reign have been destroyed. He greatly rebuilt and expanded the royal (imperial) palace in Buda. Twice he searched for pictorial representations of famous buildings to be used as reference. In 1414, he asked Siena for a picture of the hospital of Santa Maria della Scala, and in 1416, the painter Bertrand de la Barre collaborated with the mason Jean Laurent to produce an image of the papal palace in Avignon. The notable common trait between the buildings seemed to be their large timber-vaulted halls. According to Ernő Marosi, "In political terms, such a building would advance the concept of an assembly of states, serving not only as a parliament for Hungary but also as a meeting place for the electors and vassals of the imperial realm." The sculptures reflect Sigismund's French experience in the 1400s.

Saint Sigismund's Collegiate Church, built between 1410 and 1424, was similar in location and type to the Frauenkirche, Nuremberg.

He completed the palace in Visegrad, of which the construction project was started under the Angeline kings. The ruins of this palace, excavated in 1934, can be seen today, with the palace chapel and the palace garden.

==== Portraiture ====
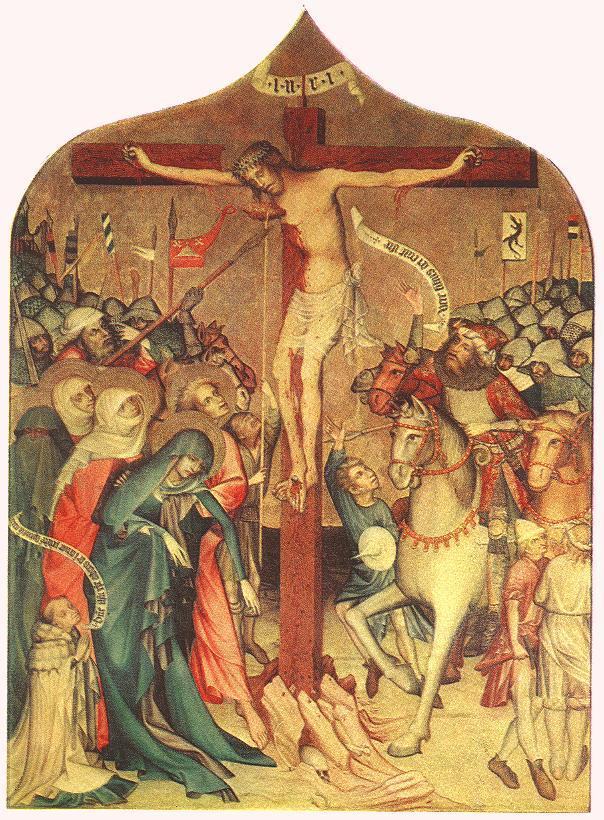
Master Thomas De Coloswar - Crucifixion

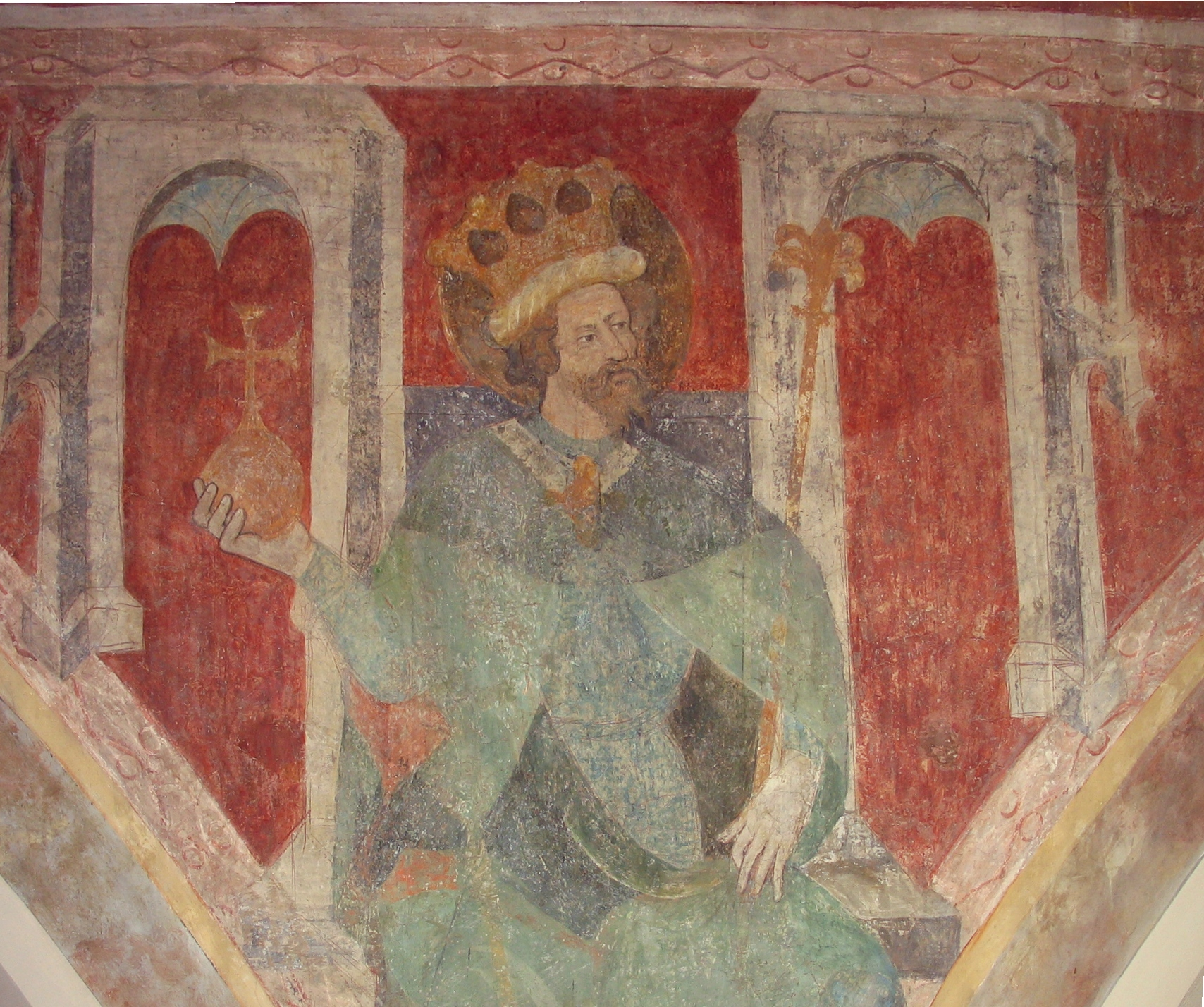
Fresco in Konstanz shows Sigismund in the guise of Saint Sigismund

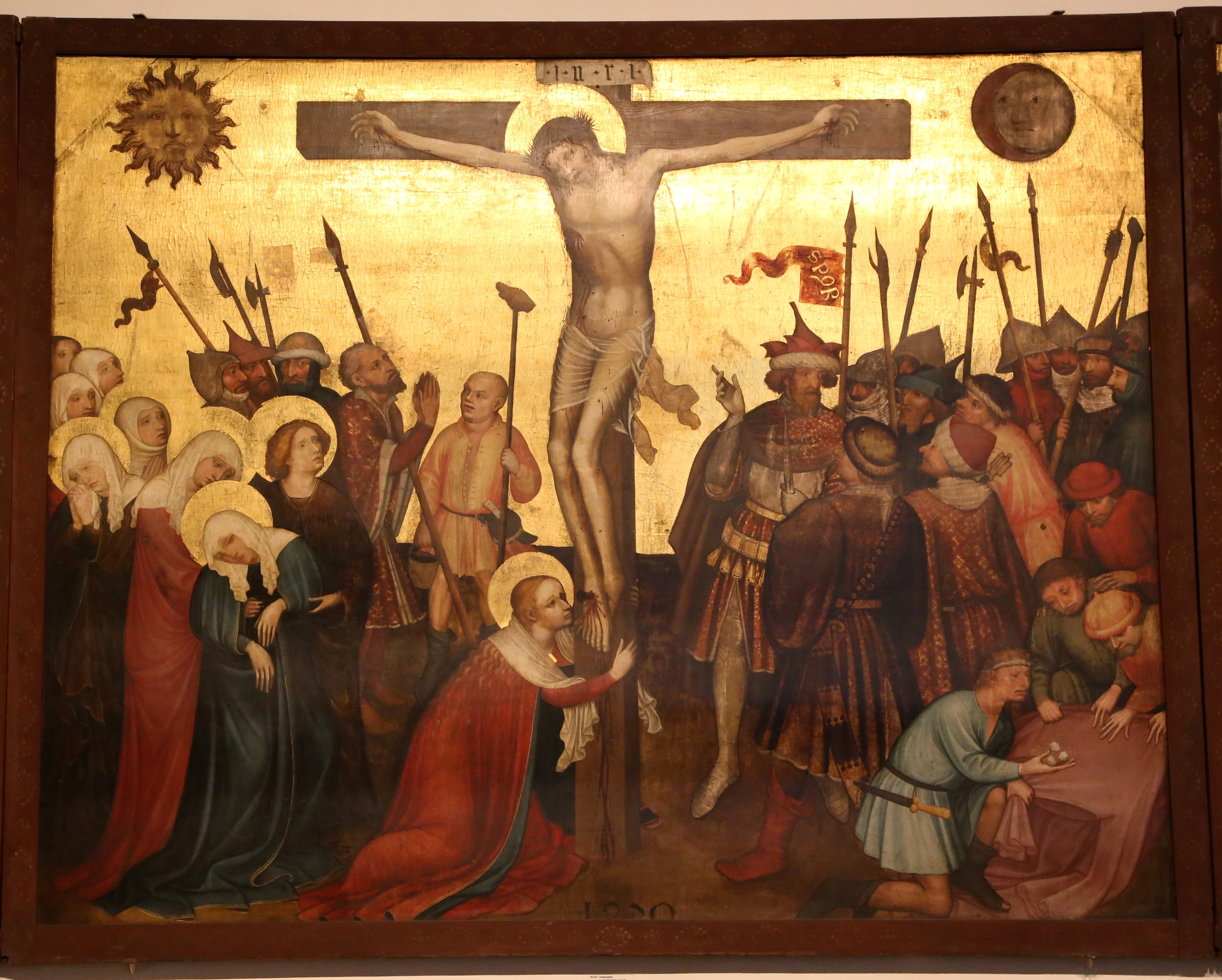
Bamberg altar (detail) with Sigismund in the guise of a centurion)

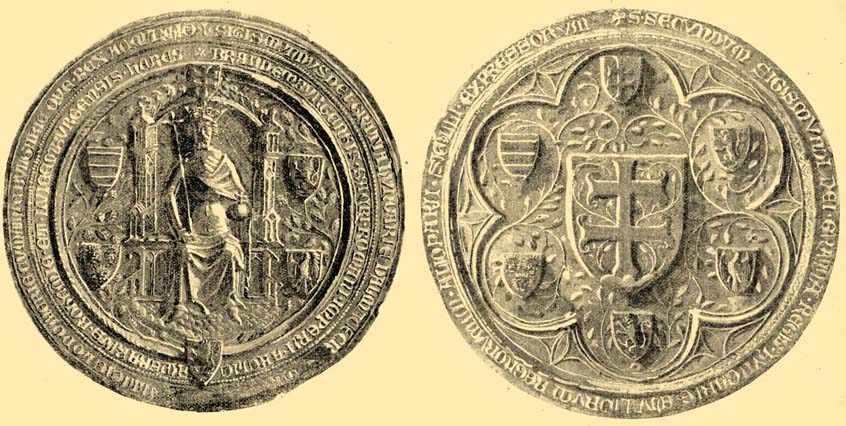
Sigismund's Hungarian majestic seal used before 1433.

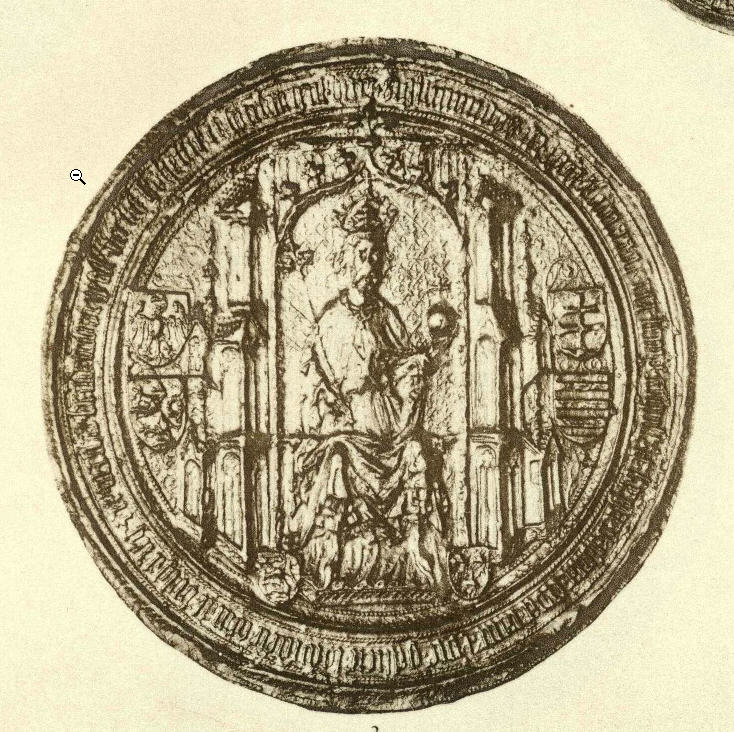
Sigismund's German majestic seal used before 1433.

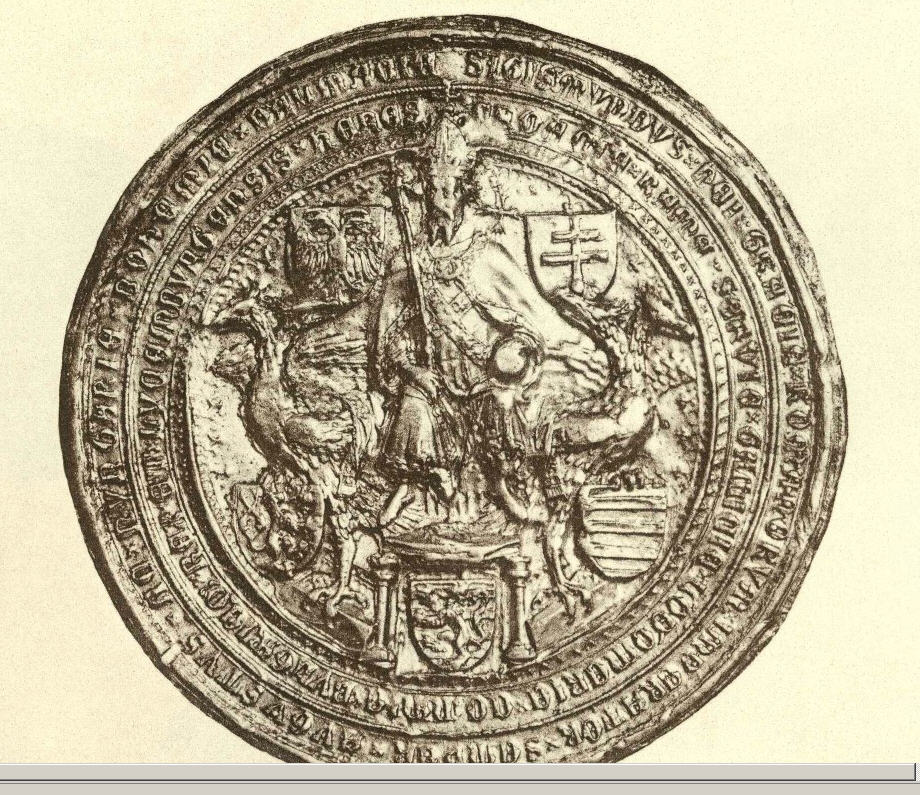
Sigismund's German majestic seal used after 1433.

Regarding Sigismund's portraiture, Len Scales notes that, "Sigismund's significant moment in European cultural history, when the multiplication of recognisable likenesses of the ruler came, as never before, to seem both possible and desirable. No monarch of the time was the subject of more intense and specific visual reproduction than Sigismund. Even his seals bear finely-sculpted portrait images, with characteristically abundant hair and bifurcated beard." The fact that all of his thrones were harshly contested might have provided the general motivation, but the specific circumstances or purposes were unknown. The traces of Sigismund's personal involvement are sparsely registered. Instead, most of his surviving portraits were posthumous and associated with different Central European locations, usually reflecting local impulses.

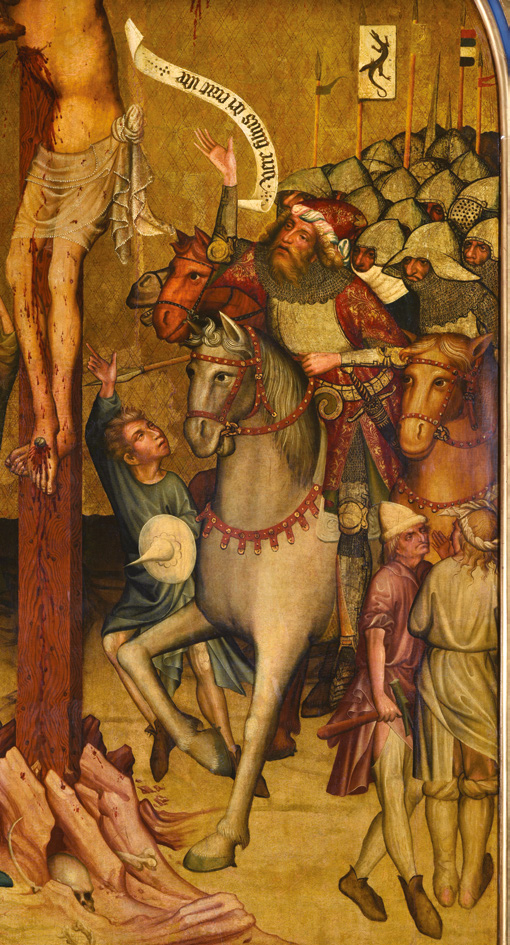
Calvary altar with the representation of King Sigismund of Hungary, 1427

- Kolozsvári Tamás (Thomas De Coloswar)'s 1427 Garamszentbenedek altarpiece, showing the scene of the Passion of Christ (Esztergom, Christian Museum), features Sigismund as a centurion.
- A fresco at the Augustinian church at Konstanz (1417) shows Sigismund in the guise of Saint Sigismund.
- The Bamberg Altarpiece also shows Sigismund in the guise of a centurion in the scene of the Crucifixion (1429), Bayerisches Nationalmuseum, Munich.

=== Later depictions ===
==== Visual arts ====
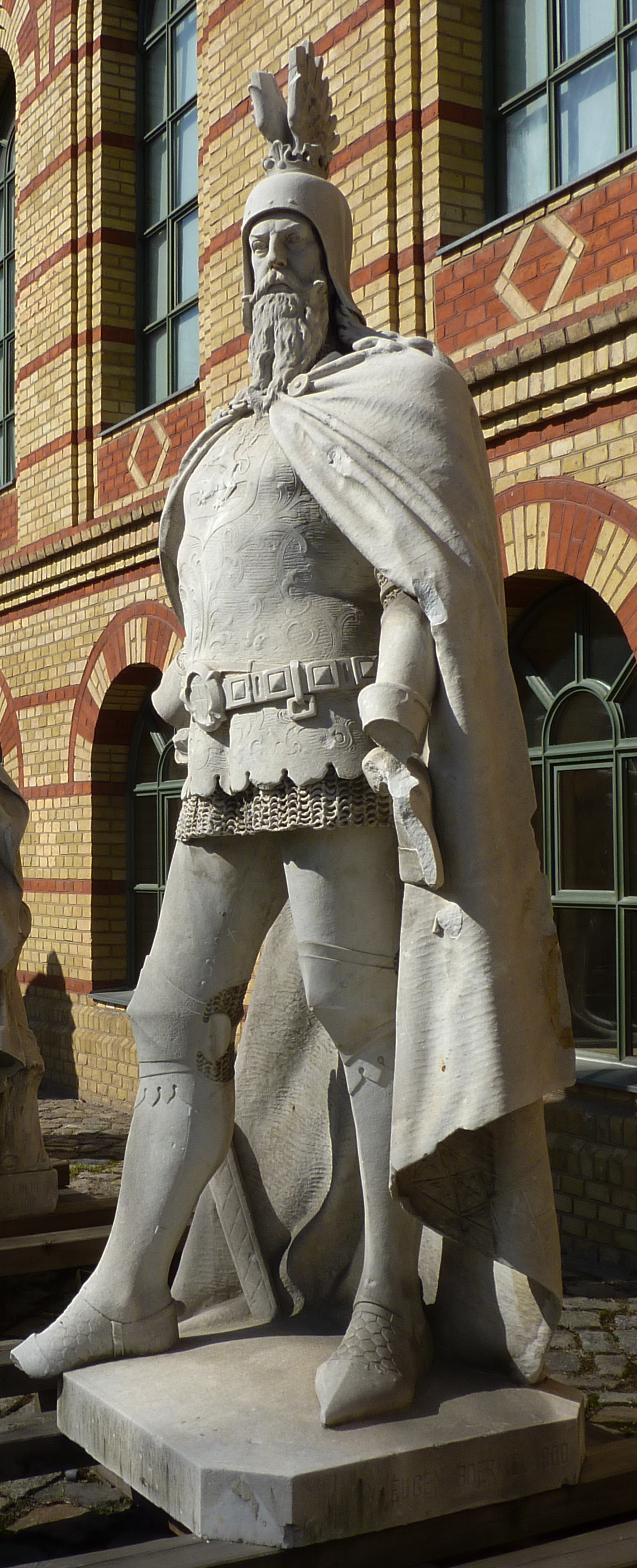
Sigismund by Eugen Boermel

- Albrecht Dürer painted the portrait of Sigismund between 1512 and 1513 for Nuremberg, whose residents were well-disposed towards him because of the favours he bestowed upon the city.
- Sigismund's portrait by Philipp Foltz (mid 19th century), is part of a series depicting emperors who reigned from 768 to 1806 (created from 1839 to 1853) in the Kaisersaal in Frankfurt am Main.
- In 1903, Leo Schnug painted the monumental Entrée solennelle de l'empereur Sigismond à Strasbourg en 1414, describing Sigismund's entry into Strasbourg in 1414.
- There is a group of statues in the former Siegesallee 14, Berlin, that commemorates Sigismund as the ruler of Brandenburg, built by Eugen Boermel between 1897 and 1900.

==== Theater ====
- La Juive, a 1835 opera by Fromental Halévy with original libretto by Eugène Scribe, features the Council of Constance.
- He was a character in the 1853 five-act trauerspiel Johann Huss by Carl Ernst.
- In the opera The Excursions of Mr. Brouček to the Moon and to the 15th Century by Leoš Janáček (premiered in 1920), Sigismund (Zikmund) does not appear but functions as the chief offstage villain, persecuting Hussite rebels.
- Gyula Háy's 1932 play Sigismund or Gott, Kaiser, Bauer ("God, emperor, peasant") portrays Sigismund's failed attempt to build an alliance with Jan Hus at the Council of Constance.
- The 2022 Hungarian drama Mária országa (The land of Mary), written by Csaba Székely and directed by Alföldi Róbert, features Sigismund. The director opines that it is strange how such a great king does not have a cult around himself like Louis the Great or Matthias.

==== Poetry ====
- The Czech poet Jan Jaroměřský (born before 1617) quotes Sigismund in his work about Jičín.

==== Films ====
In films, Sigismund often appears in the context of the Hussite movement.

- In the 1954–1956 Hussite Revolutionary Trilogy directed by Otakar Vávra, he is portrayed by Jan Pivec. As the antagonist, he is finally defeated by Jan Žižka in Against All.
- In the 1977 American biographical film John Hus, Marvin Miller plays Sigismund.
- In the 2015 Czech television film Jan Hus, directed by Jiří Svoboda, Sigismund is portrayed by Michal Dlouhý.
- In the 2022 Czech film Medieval (English-language film), also known as Warrior of God or Jan Žižka (in Czech), directed by Petr Jákl, he is depicted by Matthew Goode.

On Polish television, Sigismund has been portrayed by:

- Mariusz Dmochowski in Polish drama Królewskie sny (1988)
- Dominik Mirecki in the third season of Polish historical drama Korona królów (2019-2020). Maksymilian Dobrowolski portrayed young Sigismund (2019)

==== Others ====
- The story of the game Kingdom Come: Deliverance is about events in the reign of Sigismund. Sigismund himself appears in the sequel, Kingdom Come: Deliverance 2. In both games, he is depicted as a villain and a reason behind protagonist's plight, as he orders his home village of Skalitz to be razed, leading to the death of his family and friends.

== Commemoration ==
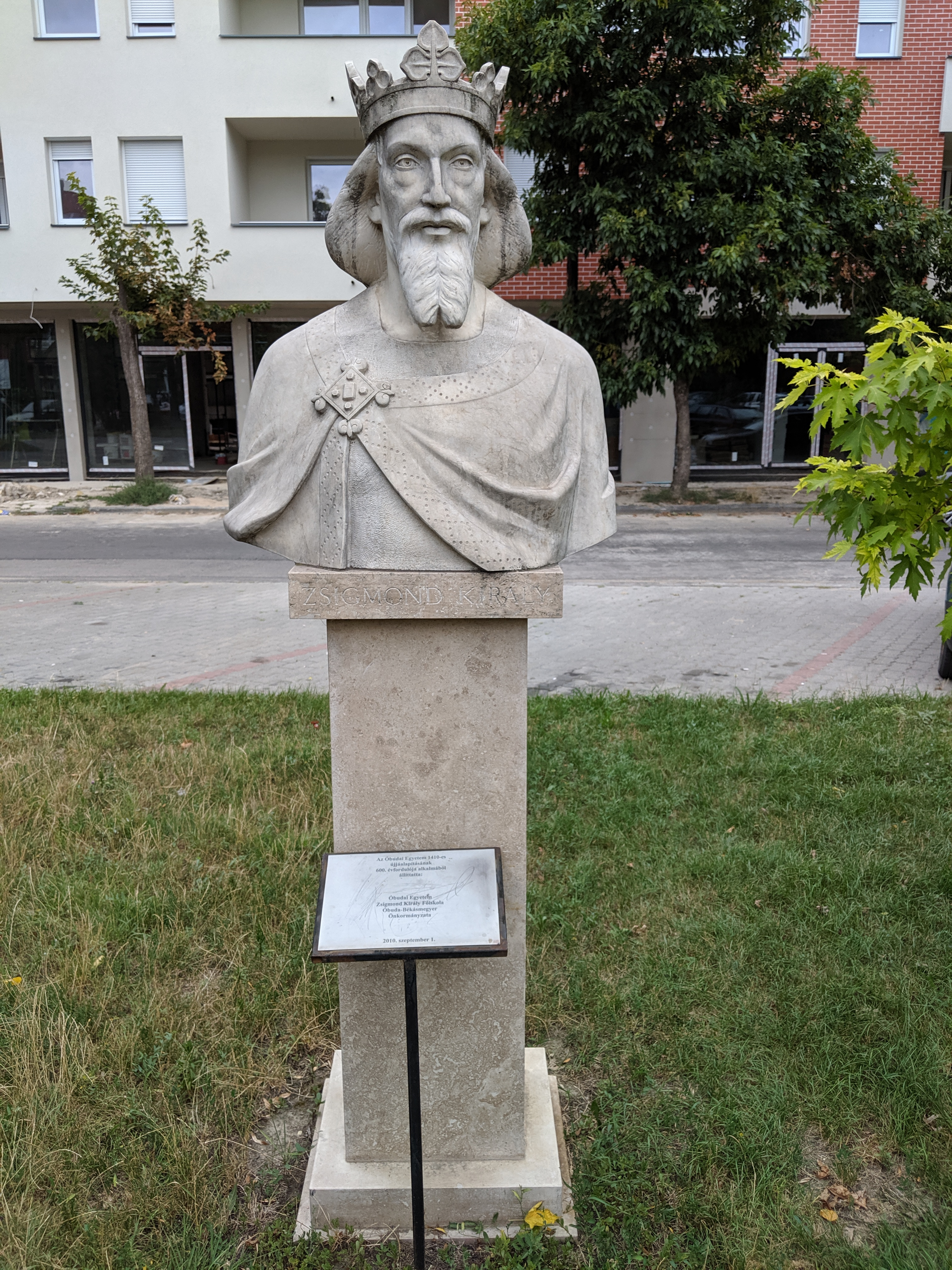
Bust of Emperor Sigismund by Katalin Csányi (2010) in Óbuda

In 2006, Hungary organized the great exhibition Sigismundus - Rex et Imperator - Art and culture under the last ruler of the Luxemburg Dynasty, 1387-1437 about the ruler's personality and activities as well as cultural achievements under his reign

== See also ==
- Cultural depictions of Charles IV, Holy Roman Emperor
- Cultural depictions of Barbara of Cilli
- Cultural depictions of Otto I, Holy Roman Emperor
- Cultural depictions of Otto III, Holy Roman Emperor
- Cultural depictions of Conrad II, Holy Roman Emperor
- Cultural depictions of Frederick I, Holy Roman Emperor
- Cultural depictions of Frederick II, Holy Roman Emperor
- Cultural depictions of Maximilian I, Holy Roman Emperor
- Cultural depictions of Charles V, Holy Roman Emperor

== Bibliography and further reading ==
Books

- Brady, Thomas A.; Brady, Thomas A. Jr. (13 July 2009). German Histories in the Age of Reformations, 1400–1650. Cambridge University Press. ISBN 978-0-521-88909-4.
- Hoensch, Jörg K. (1996). Kaiser Sigismund: Herrscher an der Schwelle zur Neuzeit, 1368–1437. München: Beck. ISBN 978-3406411199. Review by David Eltis
- Hruza, Karel (2012). Kaiser Sigismund: Zur Herrschaftspraxis eines europäischen Monarchen (1368-1437). Wien: Böhlau. ISBN 978-3-205-78755-6. Review by Winfried Irgang (in German)
- Mályusz, Elemér (1990). Kaiser Sigismund in Ungarn, 1387–1437 (in German). Akadémiai Kiadó. ISBN 978-963-05-4978-3. Review by Populer Michèle (in French)
- Sigismund von Luxemburg: ein Kaiser in Europa. Tagungsband des internationalen historischen und kunsthistorischen Kongresses in Luxemburg, 8.–10. Juni 2005. Mainz am Rhein: P. von Zabern. 2006. ISBN 3-8053-3625-X.
- Takács, Imre; Jékely, Zsombor (2006). Sigismundus Rex et Imperator: Kunst und Kultur zur Zeit Sigismunds von Luxemburg 1387–1437. Ausstellungskatalog, Budapest, Szépművészeti Múzeum, 18. März – 18. Juni 2006; Luxemburg, Musée National d'Histoire et d'Art, 13. Juli – 15. Oktober 2006. [Mainz]. ISBN 3-8053-3626-8. Review by Ansgar Frenken (in German)

Websites

- The Editors of Encyclopaedia Britannica. "Sigismund Holy Roman emperor Britannica". www.britannica.com.
