= Monika Dettwiler =

Swiss-Italian journalist and author

- Born: April 17, 1948 (age 77); Zürich, Switzerland
- Occupation(s): Swiss-italian journalist and author
- Website: www.monikadettwiler.ch

Monika Dettwiler (born 17 April 1948) is a Swiss-Italian journalist and author.

== Life ==
Monika Dettwiler was born in Zürich, 17 April 1948. She has a doctorate in history and studied history, art history and archeology in Rome, where she initially worked as a journalist and organizer of cultural tours. Her first novel, "Berner Lauffeuer", was published in 1998 and was on the bestseller list of the "Schweizer Buchhändler- und Verleger-Verband" (Swiss Booksellers and Publishers Association) for five months. In 1999, Dettwiler returned to Switzerland. She worked as a journalist at the Reformierte Presse from the year 2000 and was co-editor-in-chief from 2007 until her retirement in 2013.

She lives in Kanton Zürich and has two sons.

== Works ==
=== Novels ===
- Berner Lauffeuer. Roman zur Gründung des Schweizer Bundesstaates. Zytglogge, Gümligen 1998, ISBN 3-7296-0560-7
- Das Siegel der Macht. Ein historischer Roman um das Jahr 1000. Weitbrecht, Stuttgart/Vienna/Bern 2000, ISBN 3-522-71625-6.
- Der goldene Fluss. Historischer Roman. Kabel, Munich 2003, ISBN 3-8225-0626-5.
- Meerfeuer. Die Geschichte der Augustine W. Roman. Zytglogge, Oberhofen am Thunersee 2008, ISBN 978-3-7296-0752-1.
- Nordwestbrise Historischer Roman. Appenzeller Verlag, Herisau 2012, ISBN 978-3-85882-593-3.

=== Short stories ===
- Im Morgenrot. Die besten Kriminalgeschichten aus der Schweiz. Scherz, Bern 2001, ISBN 3-502-51801-7.
- Aroser Urne für Trinidad. In: Paul Ott (Hrsg.): Tatort Schweiz. 18 kriminelle Geschichten. Limmat, Zürich 2005, ISBN 3-85791-477-7, S. 9–24.
- Seegrund. In: Paul Ott (Hrsg.): Tatort Schweiz 2. 23 kriminelle Geschichten aus der viersprachigen Schweiz. Limmat, Zürich 2007, ISBN 978-3-85791-539-0.
- Die Radikalen sind eine höllische Drachenbrut. in: Paul Ott, Fritz von Gunten (Hrsg.): Gotthelf lesen – auf dem Weg zum Original. hep Verlag ag, Bern 2004, ISBN 3-03905-079-6.
