= Prayerbook of Otto III =

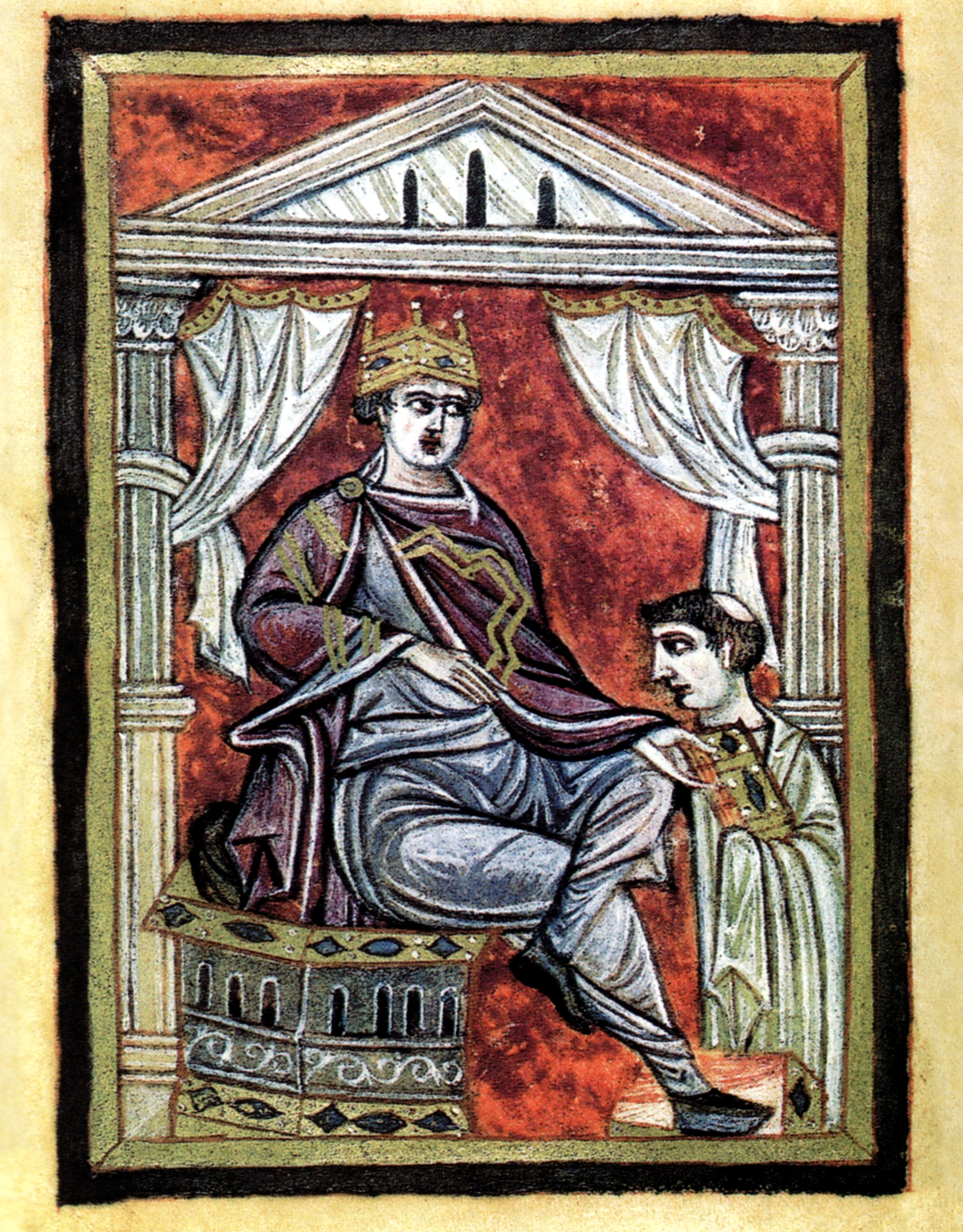
Dedicatory page, showing the manuscript being handed to Otto (folio 43, recto)

The Prayerbook of Otto III or Pommersfelden Prayerbook is an Ottonian illuminated manuscript, made up of 44 bound parchment folios. It was produced around 984 in Mainz for the private use of Otto III, Holy Roman Emperor, commissioned by his mother Theophanu and Archbishop Willigis. It is the only prayerbook to survive from the Ottonian era and its texts and images set out a monastic model for an ideal sovereign, making it more precisely a mirror of princes.

The book exemplifies the three main influences on Ottonian illumination: late Antique/early Christian, Carolingian, and Byzantine. The dedication miniature draws from the late Antique iconography seen in the Chronography of 354, the emperor prostrating himself before Jesus comes from Carolingian ideology, and the depiction of Otto orant below a Deesis derives from contemporaneous Byzantine imagery.

It was acquired in 1994 by the Bavarian State Library, and given the catalogue number Clm 30111.

== Sources ==
- Jeep, John M. (2001). Medieval Germany: An Encyclopedia. Psychology Press. pp. 600–. ISBN 978-0-8240-7644-3.
- https://web.archive.org/web/20160304191104/https://opacplus.bsb-muenchen.de/metaopac/singleHit.do?methodToCall=showHit&curPos=1&identifier=100_SOLR_SERVER_303272114
- Faksimile Verlag, publisher of the facsimile edition of the Prayerbook of Otto III
