= Michel Parisse =

French historian (1936–2020)

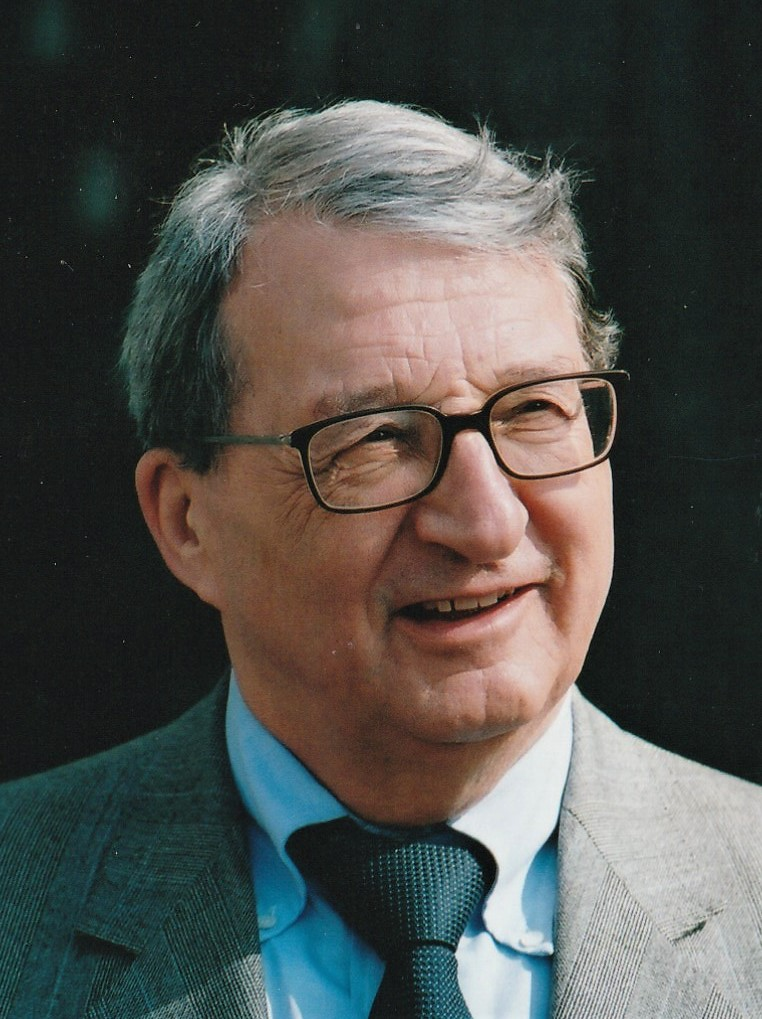
- Born: 1 May 1936; Void-Vacon, France
- Died: 5 April 2020 (aged 83); Paris, France
- Occupation: Historian

Michel Parisse (1 May 1936 – 5 April 2020) was a French historian who specialized in medieval studies. He was a professor emeritus at the University of Paris 1 Pantheon-Sorbonne.

== Career ==
Parisse earned his agrégation in history in 1959. He earned two doctoral degrees, with the first coming in 1966. His thesis was titled Actes des évêques de Metz (1120-1179). His second doctoral degree came in 1975, with the thesis La noblesse lorraine (xie – xiiie siècle). He was a professor at Nancy 2 University from 1965 to 1993. He was the Director of ARTEM from 1983 to 1993, which conducted research on medieval texts and their meanings. He directed the French Historical Mission in Germany from 1985 to 1991, and then worked as a professor of medieval history at Panthéon-Sorbonne from 1993 to 2002.

Parisse died on 5 April 2020 at the age of 83 due to COVID-19.

== Publications ==
=== Studies ===
- Le nécrologe de Gorze. Contribution à l’histoire monastique (1971)
- "Les chartes des évêques de Metz au xiie siècle : étude diplomatique et paléographique" (1976)
- La Noblesse lorraine, xie – xiiie siècle (1976)
- Historie de la Lorraine (1977)
- Histoire de Nancy (1978)
- Lorraine : cadre naturel, histoire, art, littérature, langue, économie, traditions populaires (1980)
- La Lorraine monastique au Moyen Âge (1981)
- Les Bénédictines de Lorraine et leurs documents nécrologiques (1982)
- Noblesse et chevalerie en Lorraine médiévale : les familles nobles du xie au xiiie siècle (1982)
- Les Nonnes au Moyen Âge (1983)
- La Tapisserie de Bayeux (1983)
- Les religieuses en France au xiiie siècle (1985)
- Histoire de la Lorraine (1987)
- Austrasie, Lotharingie, Lorraine (1990)
- Actes des évêques de France (1991)
- À propos des actes d'évêques : hommage à Lucie Fossier (1991)
- Le roi de France et son royaume autour de l’an mil (1992)
- Atlas de l’an Mil (1994)
- Atlas de la France de l'An mil : état de nos connaissances (1994)
- Bayeux : la tapisserie : comment comprendre cet univers familier aux spectateurs anglais ou normands du xiie siècle ? (1997)
- La Vie de Jean, abbé de Gorze (1999)
- Les Médiévistes français (2001)
- Allemagne et Empire au Moyen Âge : 400-1510 (2002)
- Histoire de la Lorraine (2005)
- Manuel de paléographie médiévale : manuel pour grands commençants (2006)
- Les chanoines réguliers : émergence et expansion, xie – xiiie siècles (2006)

=== Collective works ===
- 54 chartes originales antérieures à 1121 conservées dans le département de Meurthe-et-Moselle (1977)
- Noblesse et chevalerie en Lorraine médiévale : les familles nobles du xie au xiiie siècle (1982)
- Grandes dates de l'histoire lorraine (1982)
- Colloque Hugues Capet, 987-1987, la France de l'an mil (1987) Le roi de France et son royaume autour de l'An mil... (1987)
- L'abbaye de Gorze au xe siècle : table ronde de Gorze (1988)
- Encyclopédie illustrée de la Lorraine. 2, Histoire de la Lorraine. Austrasie, Lotharingie, Lorraine (1990)
- Les cartulaires : actes de la Table ronde organisée par l'Ecole nationale des chartes et le GDR 121 du CNRS (1991)
- Doppelklöster und andere Formen der Symbiose männlicher und weiblicher Religiosen im Mittelalter (1992)
- L'Allemagne au xiiie siècle : de la Meuse à l'Oder (1994)
- La Lorraine, la France, l'Europe (1996)
- Les chapitres de dames nobles entre France et Empire : actes du colloque d'avril 1996 / organisé par la Société d'histoire locale de Remiremont (1998)
- L'Europe au siècle de l'an mil (1999)
- Les historiens et le latin médiéval : colloque tenu à la Sorbonne (1999)
- L’Europe au siècle de l’an Mil (1999)
- Apprendre le latin médiéval : manuel pour grands commençants (2005)
