= Cultural depictions of Frederick Barbarossa =

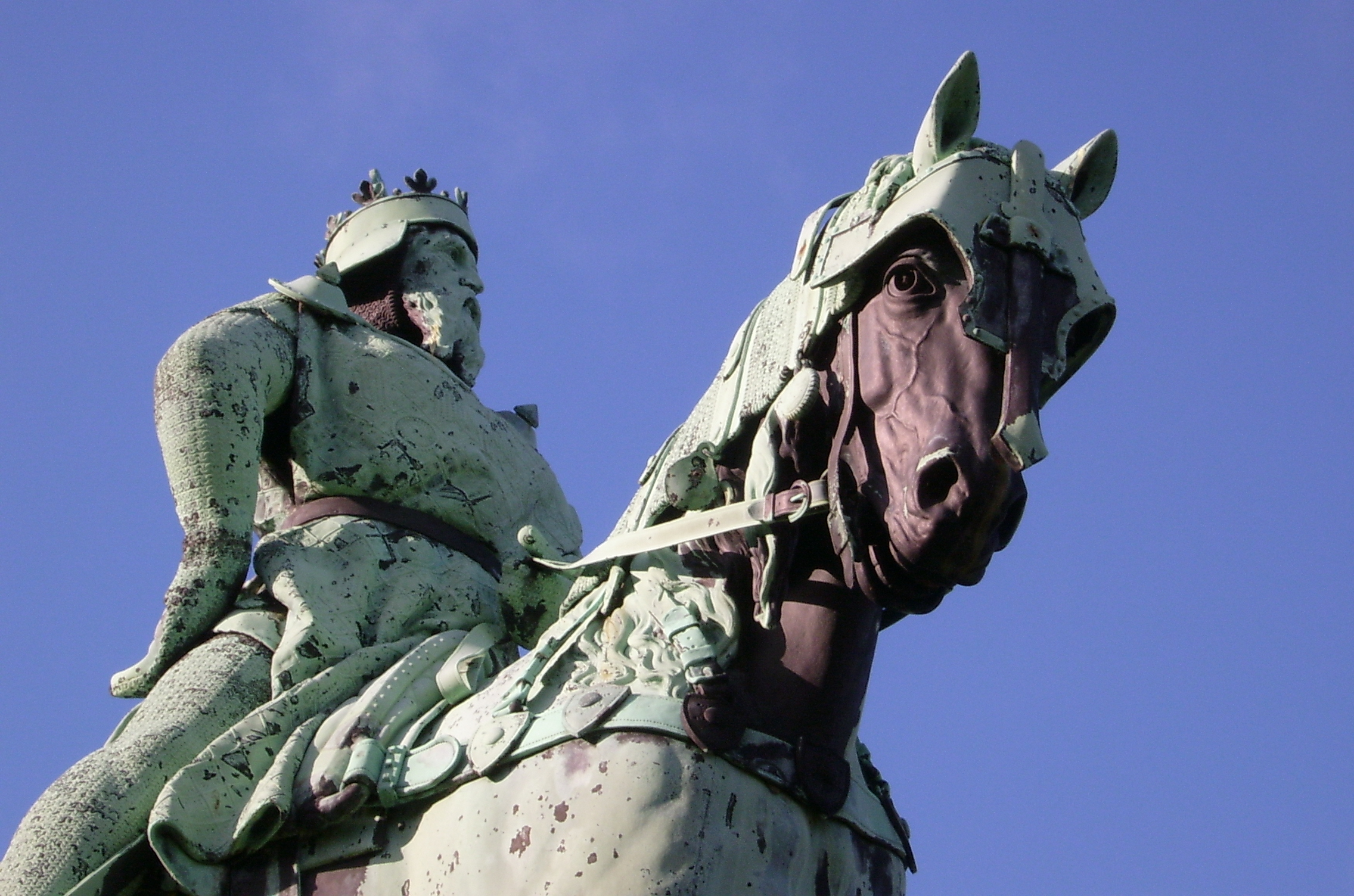
Equestrian statue of Frederick Barbarossa at the Kaiserpfalz complex

Frederick I, nicknamed Barbarossa, was one of the most notable Holy Roman emperors, who left a considerable political and cultural legacy, especially in Germany and Italy. Thus, he has been the subjects of many studies as well as works of art. Due to his popularity and notoriety, in the 19th and early 20th centuries, he was instrumentalized as a political symbol by many movements and regimes: the Risorgimento, the Wilhelmine government in Germany (especially under Emperor Wilhelm I), and the National Socialist movement. Today, when a tradition-establishing form of commemoration for the emperor is no longer necessary, scholars like Kurt Görich call for neutrality and warn against the instrumentalization of the historical person in the other way. Modern historians generally reject nationalist myths, while portraying the emperor as an influential ruler who suffered many setbacks but often managed to recover. He reestablished in Germany, enhanced the imperial position, but also made mistakes when trying to assert his authority over North Italian communes, leading to a prolonged struggle. After being humbled in the Battle of Legnano, he changed his policies and attained a better working relationship with the Italian communes. His successful diplomatic efforts together with a developing circumstance also opened new possibilities for the imperial position, notably through the marriage of his son Henry VI with Constance of Sicily. Different studies explore different aspects of his personality, with recent German scholarship emphasizing the emperor's relationship with the chivalrous-courtly culture of the time.

== Legends and anecdotes ==
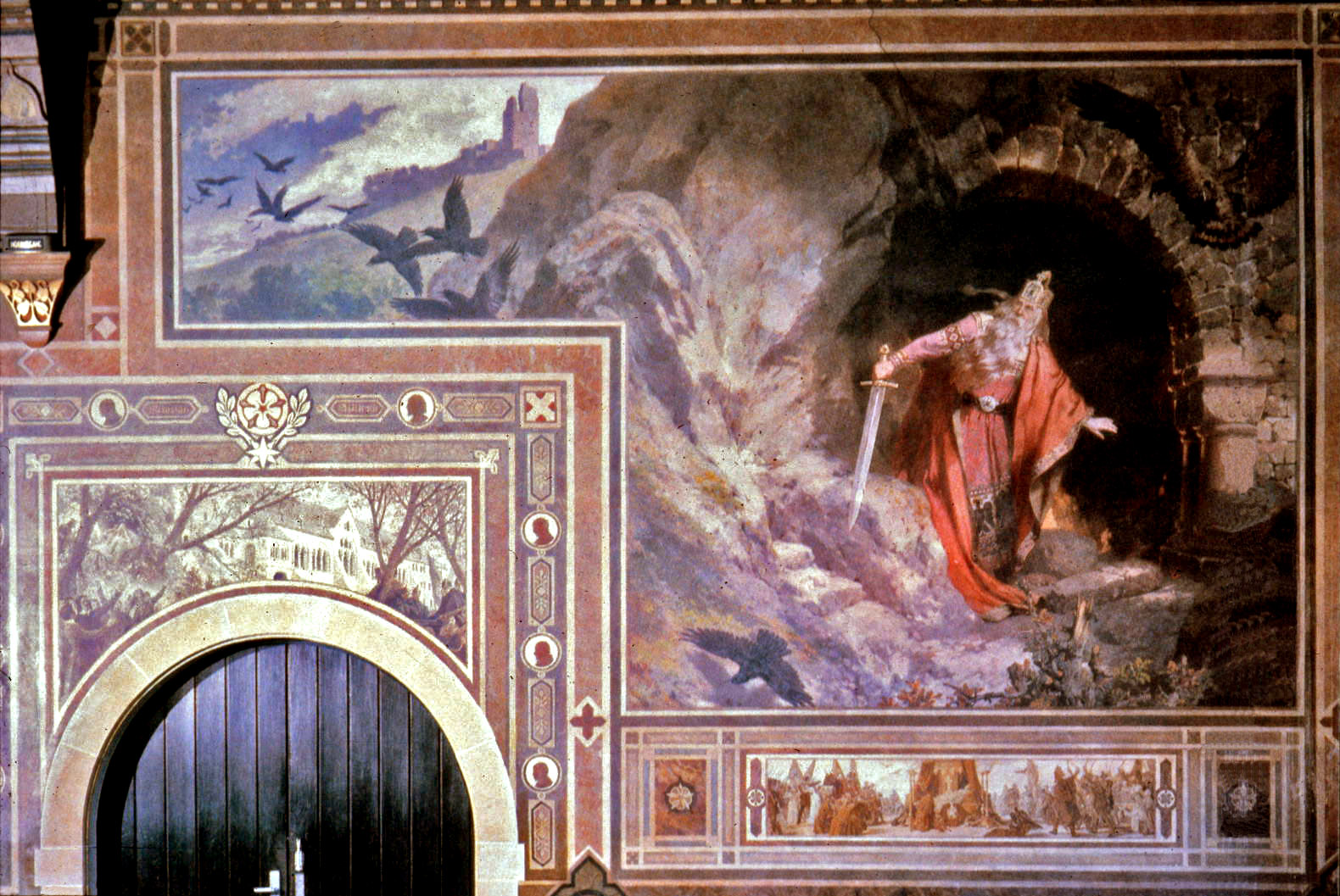
Barbarossas Erwachen (Barbarossa awakening. Wislicenus)

- After the 1162 conquest of the city of Milan in 1162, the remains of the Three Kings were sent to Cologne. Today, the Cologne Cathedral houses them and they are still venerated.
- As the popular emperor died without confessing (in the medieval time, a sudden death was considered a punishment from God), various myths were born to help the people cope with this situation. Some chroniclers thus changed the story so that the emperor could repent before dying.
- The most famous Barbarossa legend is the Kyffhäuser legend. The legend says he is not dead, but asleep with his knights in a cave in the Kyffhäuser mountains in Thuringia or Mount Untersberg at the border between Bavaria, Germany, and Salzburg, Austria, and that when the ravens cease to fly around the mountain he will awake and restore Germany to a Golden Age. According to the story, his red beard has grown through the table at which he sits. His eyes are half closed in sleep, but now and then he raises his hand and sends a boy out to see if the ravens have stopped flying. A similar story, set in Sicily, was earlier attested about his grandson, Frederick II. To garner political support the German Empire built atop the Kyffhäuser the Kyffhäuser Monument, which declared Kaiser Wilhelm I the reincarnation of Frederick; the 1896 dedication occurred on 18 June, the day of Frederick's coronation. According to Freed, the Prussians were not particularly passionate about the Barbarossa mania in the beginning though (Barbarossa had mainly been a symbol for the Southern princes, who wanted to send a message that they wanted to participate in the affairs of the central government as in the time of the emperor). They only started promoting the legend actively in 1871 (the year Wilhelm I became German emperor).

In medieval Europe, the Golden Legend became refined by Jacobus de Voragine. This was a popularized interpretation of the Biblical end of the world. It consisted of three things: (1) terrible natural disasters; (2) the arrival of the Antichrist; (3) the establishment of a good king to combat the Antichrist. These millennial fables were common and freely traded by the populations on Continental Europe. End-time accounts had been around for thousands of years, but entered the Christian tradition with the writings of the Apostle Peter.

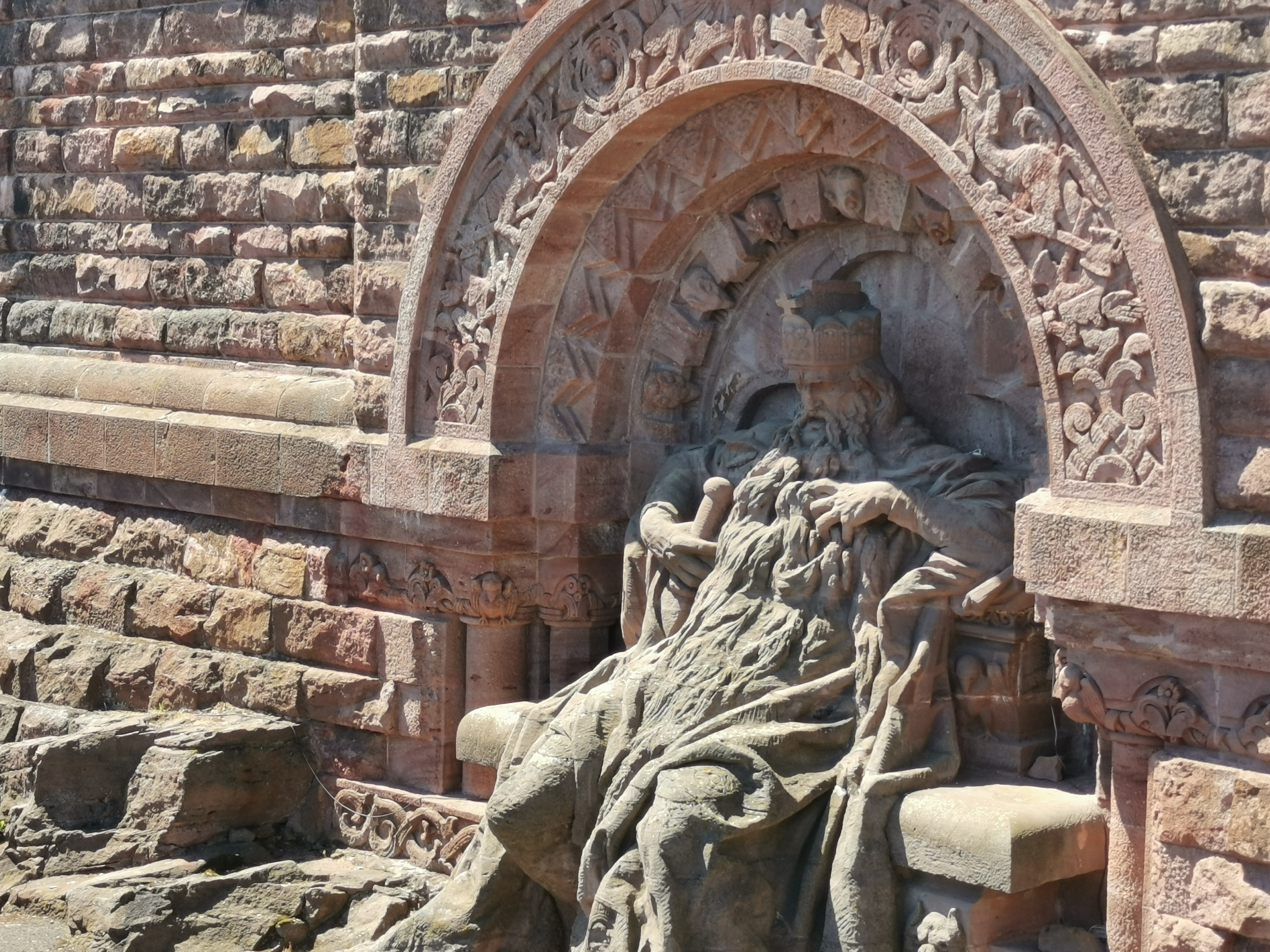
Barbarossa by Nikolaus Geiger, Kyffhäuserdenkmal, now a tourism magnet.

The legend has been read as prophecy from the beginning, as seen in the Italian collection Sibyla Eritrea, the Sächsische Weltchronik (1260), Salimbene di Adam's Cronica (1280). Barbarossa appears in a Messianic form, not just a new but also the final type of ruler – emperor of peace, who is associated with the latter days. In later centuries, German propaganda played into the exaggerated fables believed by the common people by characterizing Frederick Barbarossa and Frederick II as personification of the "good king". Other figures like Martin Luther, Frederick II the Great of Prussia and Bismarck also became associated with the cult of the national leader, which would later be mobilized by national socialists.

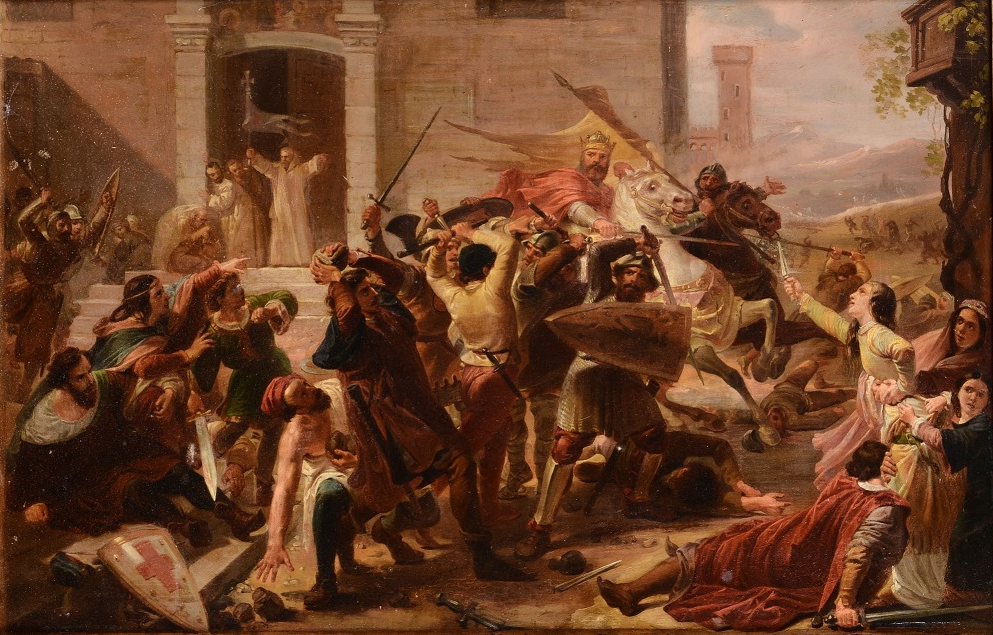
La cacciata dell'imperatore Barbarossa da Alessandria ("The expulsion of Emperor Barbarossa from Alexandria") of Carlo Arienti (1851).

- Another legend states that when Barbarossa was in the process of seizing Milan in 1158, his wife, the Empress Beatrice, was taken captive by the enraged Milanese and forced to ride through the city on a donkey in a humiliating manner. Some sources of this legend indicate that Barbarossa implemented his revenge for this insult by forcing the magistrates of the city to remove a fig from the anus of a donkey using only their teeth. Another source states that Barbarossa took his wrath upon every able-bodied man in the city, and that it was not a fig they were forced to hold in their mouth, but excrement from the donkey. To add to this debasement, they were made to announce, "Ecco la fica" (meaning "behold the fig"), with the feces still in their mouths. It used to be said that the insulting gesture (called fico), of holding one's fist with the thumb in between the middle and forefinger came by its origin from this event. This legend is mentioned in Gargantua and Pantagruel (sixteenth century).
- During the Risorgimento in Italy, Frederick became the symbolic barbarian, foreign oppressor who were defeated by heroes of a national independence movement respresented by the Lombard League. This interpretation later had influence on Italian historiography. Various stories arose – an example is the one by Cesare Cantù, who recounted that Frederick sent back Milanese people whose hands he had cut off or without their eyes. According to Cardini, until this day, some schoolbooks in Italy still describe Frederick Barbarossa as a National Socialist avant-la-lettre.
- In Italy, unlike in Germany, Barbarossa as a legendary character remains ambivalent. There are different, even contrasting accounts of his deeds. He inspires strong emotions. While in Milan, Tortona and Asti, the cities that were destroyed by Frederick Barbarossa, still see him as the foreign oppressor, he is seen in favorable light in Como, Pavia and Lodi (it was Lodi's complaint to Barbarossa about Milan's bullying that brought him to Italy) – the latter group sees him as "an ancient supporter of their own cities' traditions". In Brienno, he even has a holy image. For Spoleto, dark and light legends are mixed to produce a "beloved enemy" (amato nemico).

== Historiography ==
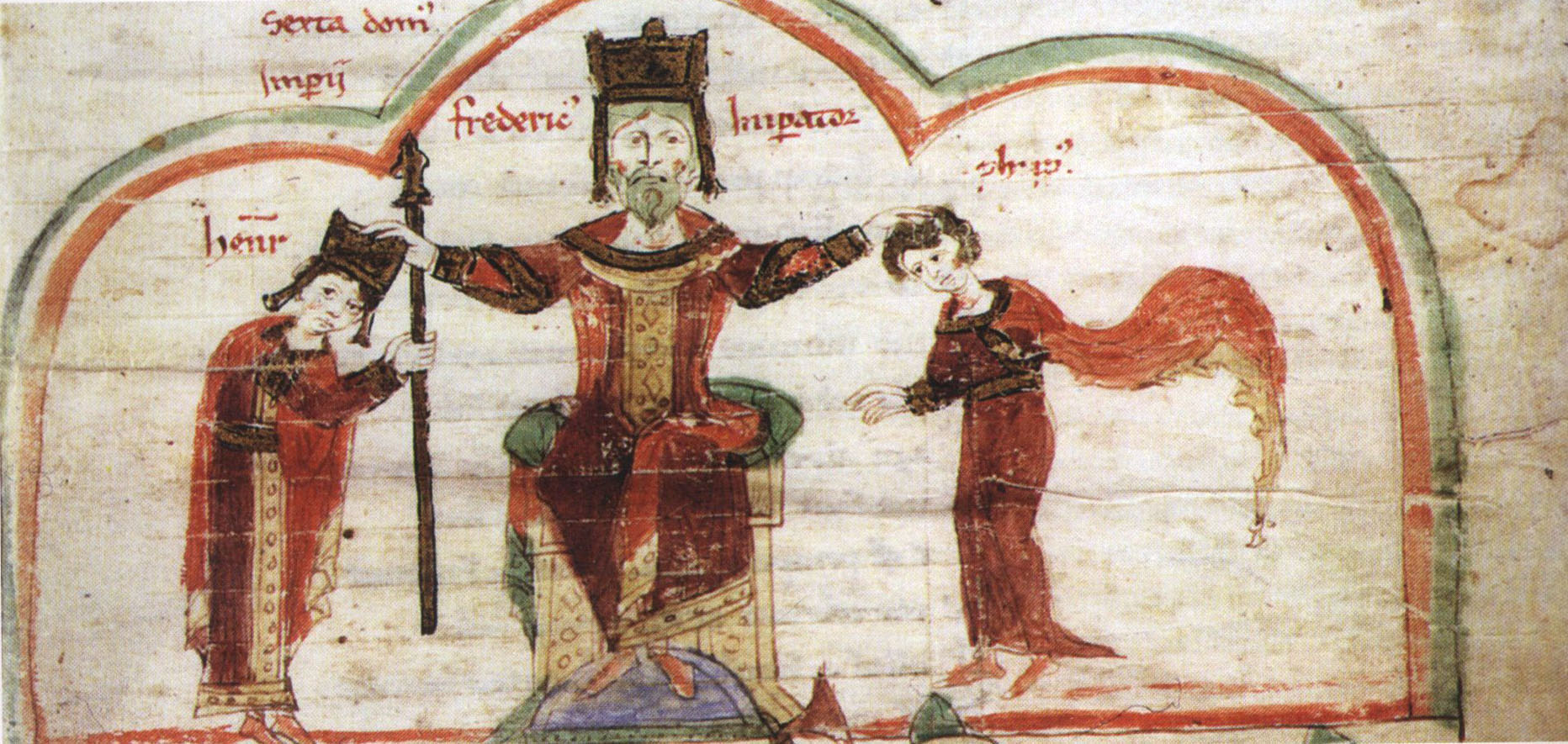
Barbarossa and his sons Henry and Philip, Liber ad honorem Augusti des Petrus von Eboli, Burgerbibliothek Bern, Codex 120 II, fol. 143r.

In 2010, Professor Gianluca Raccagni of the University of Edinburgh summarized the current knowledge on Frederick's rule as the following:

There are good reasons for Frederick’s enduring legacy and fame through the centuries, since he was deeply involved in expanding the influence of the Holy Roman Empire, enjoyed a long and remarkably stable rule in Germany (relatively speaking), was engaged in a momentous struggle with the papacy and the Lombard city communes, and had extensive contacts with the other Christian rulers in Europe and the Mediterranean, not to mention the crusade that he undertook and during which he died. Frederick came very close to killing the autonomy of the Italian city-states shortly after their birth, to re-establishing imperial control over the papacy, and to expanding his hegemony in the Mediterranean as well. A recent series of conferences has also underlined the profound influence of his reign on the development of public law.

Otto of Freising, Frederick's uncle, wrote an account of his reign entitled Gesta Friderici I imperatoris (Deeds of the Emperor Frederick). Otto's other major work, the Chronica sive Historia de duabus civitatibus (Chronicle or History of the Two Cities) had been an exposition of the Civitas Dei (The City of God) of St. Augustine of Hippo, full of Augustinian negativity concerning the nature of the world and history. His work on Frederick is of opposite tone, being an optimistic portrayal of the glorious potentials of imperial authority. Otto died after finishing the first two books, leaving the last two to Rahewin, his provost. Rahewin's text is in places heavily dependent on classical precedent.

According to John Freed, until the end of the nineteenth century, even scholars in Germany had to rely on a semi-popular history to get a general overview of Frederick's reign. There were two occasions a substantial effort was made to create a comprehensive biography for the emperor and both ended with the main author's death. The first was the work of Henry Simonsfeld, who died in 1913 and his book, never completed, ends with Otto of Freising's death in 1158. The other notable contribution is the two volumes about Frederick in Wilhelm von Giesebrecht’s Geschichte der Deutschen Kaiserzeit (1855–88). Giesebrecht died in 1889 and thus his student Bernhard von Simson was the one who completed the work in 1895. This later became the scholarly standard work on the emperor's life. Giesebrecht presents Barbarossa's era as a high point of German history. Freed opines that this work was meant to arouse patriotism.

In 1975, Frederick's charters were published. This and the postwar abandonment of the Kyffhäuser myth have led to the publications of several new biographies. The notable recent authorities among German-speaking historians include Ferdinand Opll, Johannes Laudage (who died in an accident in 2008 so could not write the section on the 1170s). and Knut Görich.

Bernd Schütte credits Ferdinand Oppl with raising the research of Frederick I to a new and resilient level, with contributions both through studies and bibliographical additions (Oppl is both a researcher and an archiver). Opll's Friedrich Barbarossa presents the emperor as a pragmatic leader with a capacity of adaptation and recovery after defeat. Jean-Yves Mariotte highly praises the works but adds that more clarity on the subjects of the imperial function or the financial aspect of the monarchy might widen the perspective.

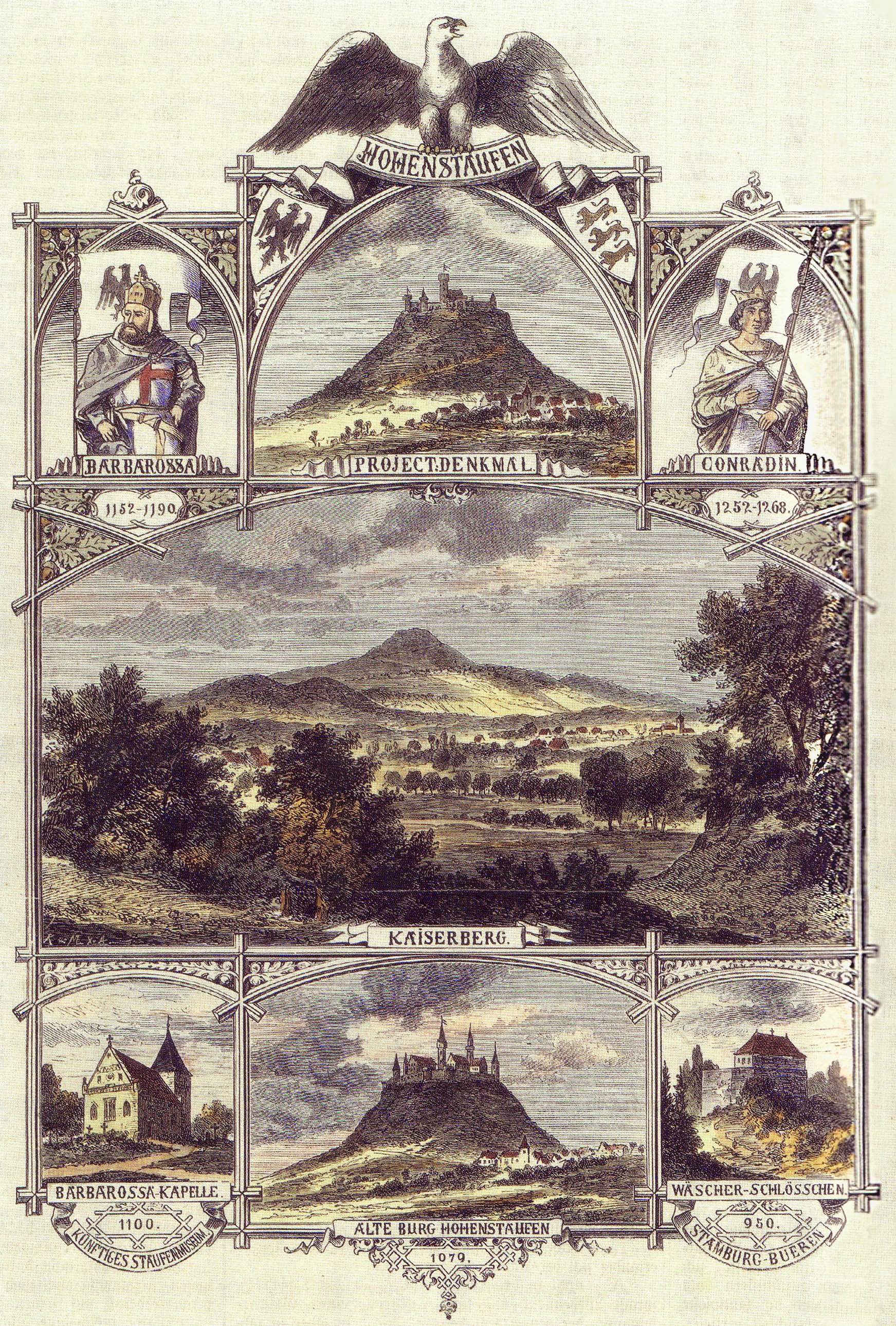
1871 Hohenstaufen Castle commemorative sheet for the national monument project (magazine "Über Land und Meer; source: Hohenstaufen/Helfenstein 2003, p.144)

Knut Görich's works on Frederick include Friedrich Barbarossa: Eine Biographie and Die Ehre Friedrich Barbarossas: Kommunikation, Konflikt und politisches Handeln im 12. Jahrhundert, in which he extensively discusses Frederick's attachment to the concept of honor imperii, which was tied to not only his self-understanding as a ruler, but also rights and duties, and also subject to balancing acts with what was politically possible. Görich does not see the 1177 Peace of Venice as a defeat for Frederick but a return to consensus, which later helped make room for maneuvre. Graham Loud agrees with Görich that the concept and language of honour permeated Frederick's reign but sometimes, they might have masked complex realities. Loud also notes Görich credibly shows Frederick as a man of ambition, calculation and skills – one of those was "an ability to satisfy and to recompense those who were not necessarily within his inner circle". On the other hand, Loud opines that Görich mentions Frederick's rule north of the Alps too little. Contrary to Laudage, Görich questions whether traditional researchers have overemphasized the intentional side of Frederick's politics and instead highlights his capability of moderating consensus politics and the will to trial new modes of rulership.

Laudage also sees the concept of honour as the central determinant behind Frederick's thinking and actions. According to Laudage, it was because the emperor lived in an environment in which many issues raised in diets and councils were ultimate conflicts of honours (Ehrkonflikte): "In a society that lacked a written imperial constitution, it was crucial to constantly and demonstratively assert one's own reputation and position in the social hierarchy."(p. 46) During his career, Frederick had demonstrated genuine chivalry and generosity, as well as great ambition, but also violence and ruthlessness. Laudage especially criticized the pure force approach Frederick employed against Milan, which ultimately doomed the enterprise. Bernd Schütte notes that Laudage "ascribes to the emperor and his advisors the decisive initiative in all fields, always future-oritented and accompanied by far-reaching ideas and plans." Schütte also opines that in comparison with Ferdinand Opll's work, published in 1990, the chivalrous-courtly aspect of Frederick is now presented in a more pronounced and clear way, as shown in Laudage's work as well as those by other recent scholars.

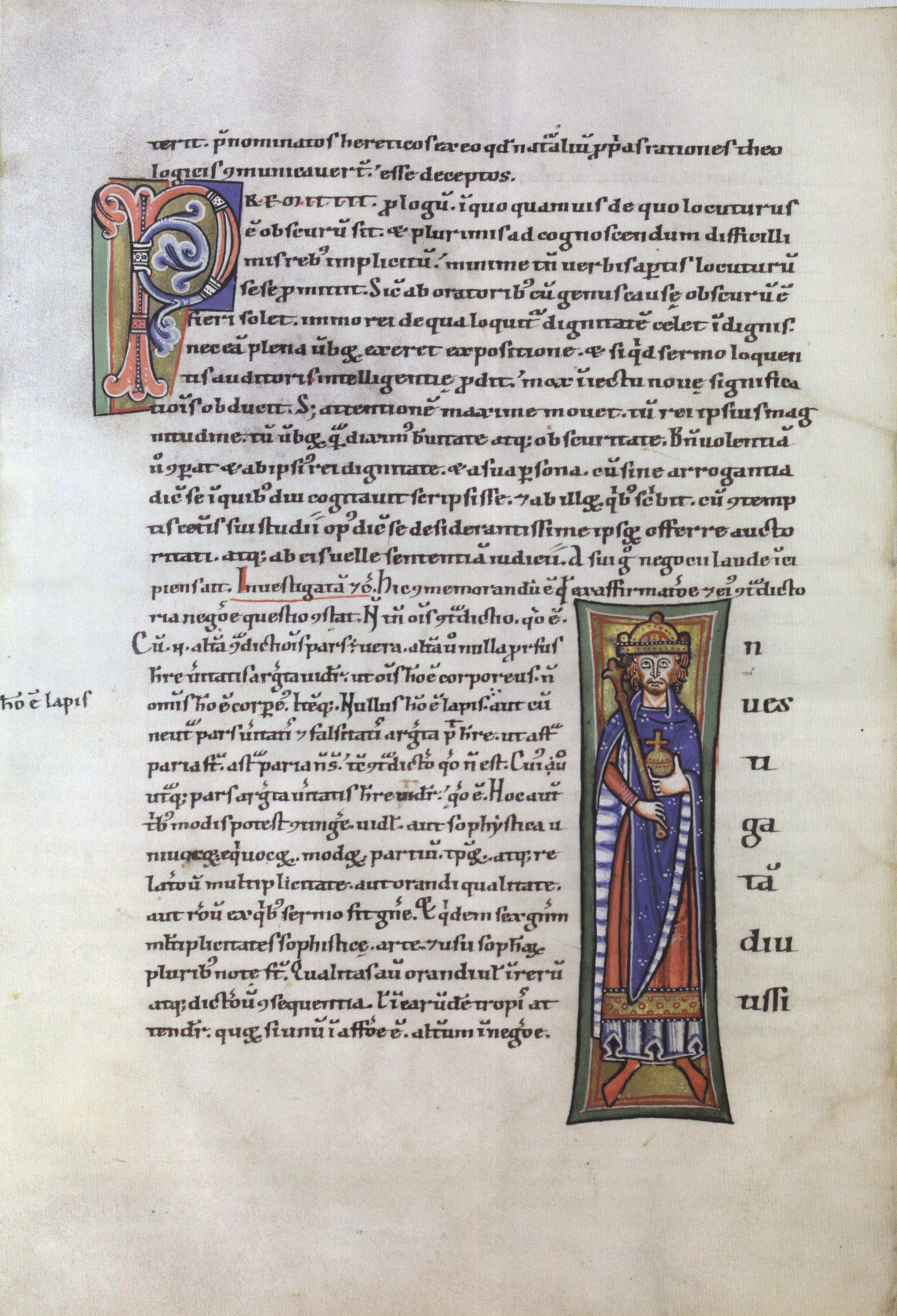
Barbarossa miniature in the 12th-century Freiburg manuscript (fol. 4v of Manuscript 367, University Library Freiburg (Universitätsbibliothek Freiburg).

Historians Plassmann and Foerster, in review of Freed's Frederick Barbarossa: the Prince and the Myth, note that the work, as "the first English-language biography of Frederick Barbarossa in several decades", is a valuable source and might serve English-speaking audience well, although there are some problems as well as views particular to the author. Other biographers also discuss the periods during the emperor was powerless, but they do not see it as pervasive throughout his reign as Freed. Plassmann notes that Freed ignores Knut Görich's point that argues that, "Frederick was universally accepted 'as king and emperor and managed to push for the succession he wanted'". According to Plassmann, Frederick achieved an "unusual level of acceptance" within Germany, which helped him to survive excommunication, pestilence, a crushing defeat against the Italian opposition and the defiance of one of the mightiest princes of the realm and ended up as the unquestioned leader of the German host on the third crusade".

Wolfgang Stürner's 2019 work on the Hohenstaufen dynasty Die Staufer. Eine mittelalterliche Herrscherdynastie. Bd. 1: Aufstieg und Machtentfaltung (975 bis 1190) is a highly regarded work about the emperor (two thirds of the book covers Barbarossa's reign). Stürner rejects the view of Barbarossa as an emperor driven by princes, and sees the emperor, first and foremost, as a ruler who tried to reestablish peace in the Empire through his role as arbitrator and judge, and his Landfriedensgesetze (peace laws), often with success. Hermann Kamp praises the overall quality of the work, while stating that it remains to be seen whether Barbarossa consistently thought and acted in this manner. He cites as an example the case of Henry the Lion and Henry Jasomirgott, whom Barbarossa reconciled expressly for the sake of family peace. For Stürner, honour did not play too much of a factor in Frederick's major decisions. For example, the defining factor in Frederick's conflict with Milian was the city's refusal to make peace with other cities that was complaining to Frederick about Milan, as well as Milan's rejection of Frederick's role as an authority appointed by God to maintain order and peace. Stürner also approves Barbarossa's plan for a centrally managed community in the Reichsitalien, although he opines that Barbarossa misjudged the self-understanding of ecclesiastical powers in the West and the unwillingness of the French and the English monarchs to support the imperial position in claiming supremacy in church matter.

In Italy, the scholarly attention towards Frederick's person and his reign has always been considerable, in light of his extensive activities in the Italian domains. In 1985, Franco Cardini wrote a sympathetic biography. Research often focuses on the relationship, or struggle, between Frederick and Italian municipalities. Today, the "oppressor and oppressed" mythical tradition, fostered by the Risorgimento, is not popular anymore. Researchers saw the conflict as the clash between opposite policial conceptions, for which the two sides tried to find solutions through legal measures as well as by force. Schumann notes that the work Federico Barbarossa nel dibattito storiografico in Italia e in Germania, edited by Manselli and Riedmann, is a definite synthesis of non-nationally oriented historiography approaches (combining German and Italian research results) of the last forty years.

Knut Görich opines that Italian writers tend to assume that responsibility the destruction of Milan lay solely with Frederick, but the cities in alliance with him played an important role too. Alfredo Pasquetti notés that German accounts show that the destruction was understood as a kind of revenge, but at the same time, the authors believed it to be justice and justified it with the hope that once the subjugation of Milan was completed, more glorious enterprises could be undertaken.

Joseph P. Huffman gives the emperor the following evaluation:

Frederick I Barbarossa died as he lived, far more successful in diplomatic victories than military ones. He was resourceful enough to leverage fissures among his opponents and to free himself from the consequences of serious setbacks, intuitively wise enough to offer his adversaries compensation for their losses while still building in future checks and balances, and politically realistic enough to believe in imperial honor and sovereignty while accepting the possible and practical when necessary.

Jenny Benham notes that the 1177 treaty of Venice ushed in a period of prosperity for the Sicilian kingdom, while the emperor and his descendants gained a claim to lordship of Sicily, and thus most of Italy, which would be realized by Constance and Henry later.

Joseph F. Byrne remarks that although the successes of the Italian communes were short-lived, in the long run, their resilience against Europe's greatest monarch reinforced a communal ethic that would last for another two centuries and beyond. Byrne opines that Frederick was a flexible politician, but in Italy, his blind spot made him refuse to understand the Italian communes' commitment to their liberties and thus, for a quarter of a century, unable to formulate a satisfactory. Together with his refusal to recognize Alexander as Pope and his need to deal with matters north of the Alps, this prevented him from succeeding as direct overlord. Peter Wilson opines that the 1177 truce, following by the Peace of Constance, through which the cities accepted imperial overlordship while the emperor recognized their communal autonomy and the League, ensured a good working relationship between both sides until the imperial civil war following the 1198 double election. Still, the situation remained open at Frederick's II death. With regard to the 1190 Crusade, Wilson writes that, "Barbarossa himself died en route, but though the expedition failed to recover Jerusalem, it relieved the pressure on the Crusader kingdoms and forged closer connections between crusading and the imperial office."

== Culture under Frederick Barbarossa ==
The reign of Barbarossa is noted for the flourishing of courtly culture and chivalrous literature. Peter Munz opines that this is "additional proof of social transformation which resulted in a universalization of feudal relationships."

=== Legal studies ===
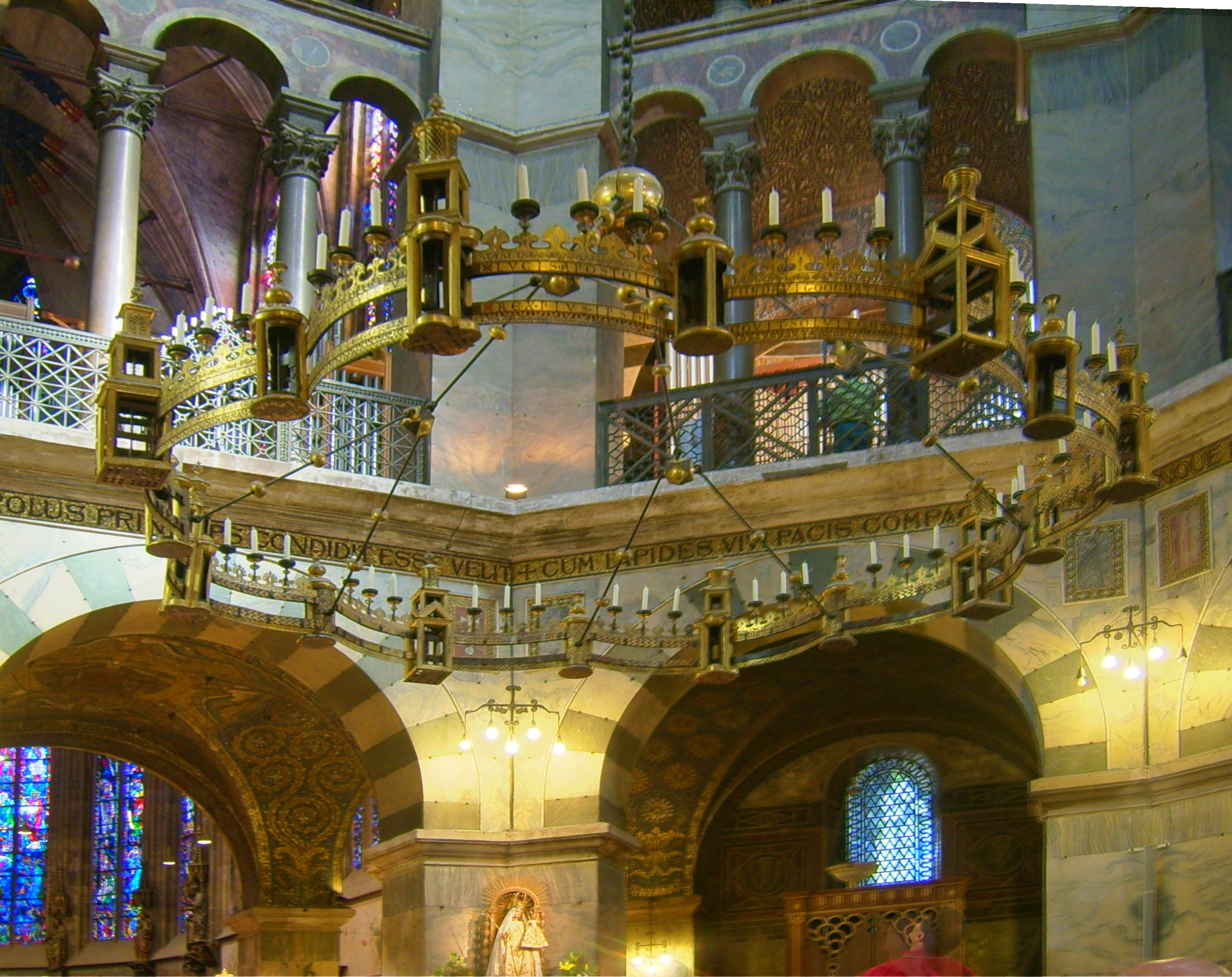
Barbarossa Chandelier in Aachen Cathedral, a gift of Barbarossa. Charlemagne was a role model for Frederick Barbarossa for his use of the law. Barbarossa advocated for Charlemage's canonization, which was done by Antipope Paschal III in 1165 (but not recognized by the Church)

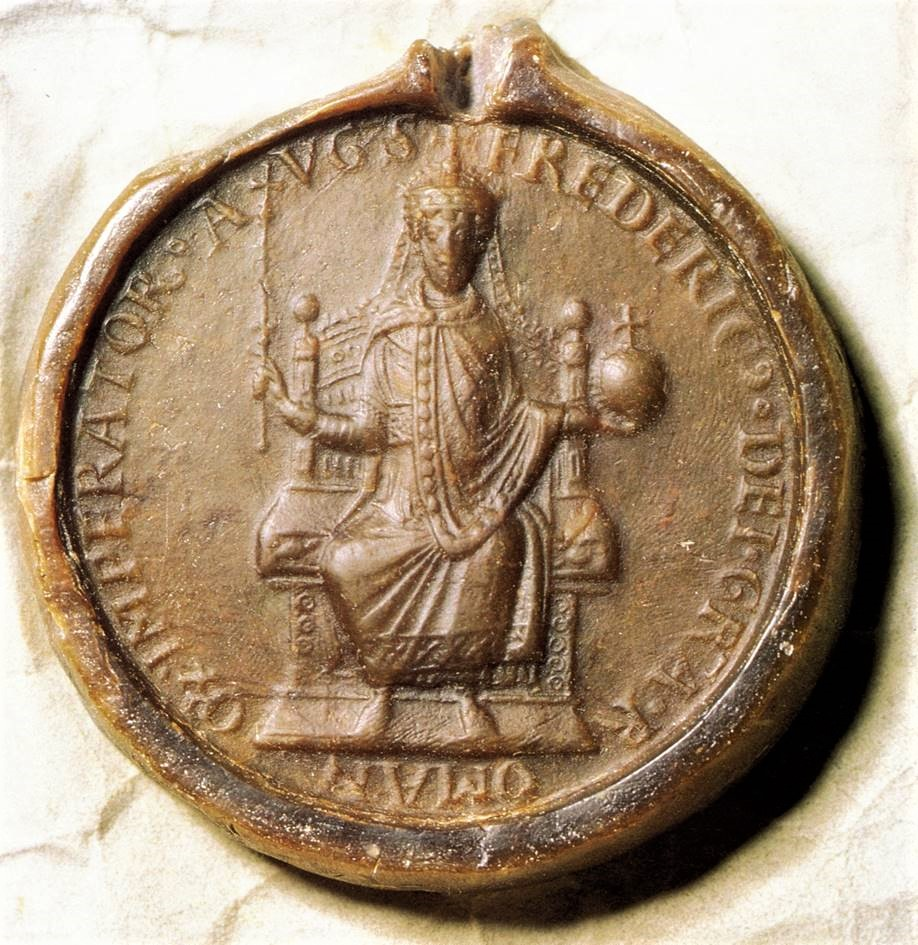
Seal of Barbarossa, 1162

Barbarossa's patronage of learning aimed chiefly at legal studies, specifically Roman laws. He took a special interest in the Law school of Bologna, granted the Authentica habita, granted the Bolognese clerics privileges and recognize the law's important role in imperial administration. The new legal learning influenced the laws issued by the emperor in Roncaglia.

=== Historiography and literature ===
Thomas Foerster remarks that the cultural and intellectual flourishing in Frederick's court was the result of both the expansion towards the Regnum Italia and the Mediterranean as well as Frederick's 1156 wedding to Beatrix of Burgundy. On one hands, the new king-emperor, through his deeds and achievements, inspired the intellectuals and historians of his time to produce works of poetry and historiography. On the other hands, the emperor showed an interest in the deeds of historical rulers, as evident in Otto of Freising's Chronica de duabus civitatibus, a Latin world chronicLe recording history from the creation of man to Frederick's era, and Gesta Friderici Imperatoris, a notable early Hohenstaufen historiographical work. Other notable works include the Carmen de gestis Frederici imperatoris in Lombardia, authored by a scholar residing in Italy; the Historia expeditione Frederici, referring the 1189–90 crusade; Ligurinus, an epic poem that turns the prose of the Gesta Friderici into verse; the works of Godfrey of Viterbo, who served both Barbarossa and Henry VI.

Together with bringing real peace to Germany, Frederick and his contemporaries tried to build a culture of peace. The king-emperor, as pater patria, was expected to bring peace. But Frederick emphasized setting the pattern of peace with justice, rather than affection in the Salian manner. Otto of Freising, in the Gesta Friderici Imperatoris, read this "attitude into his nephew's every gesture". In Otto's view, constancia made the emperor a rector who balanced between the functions of king and high cleric.

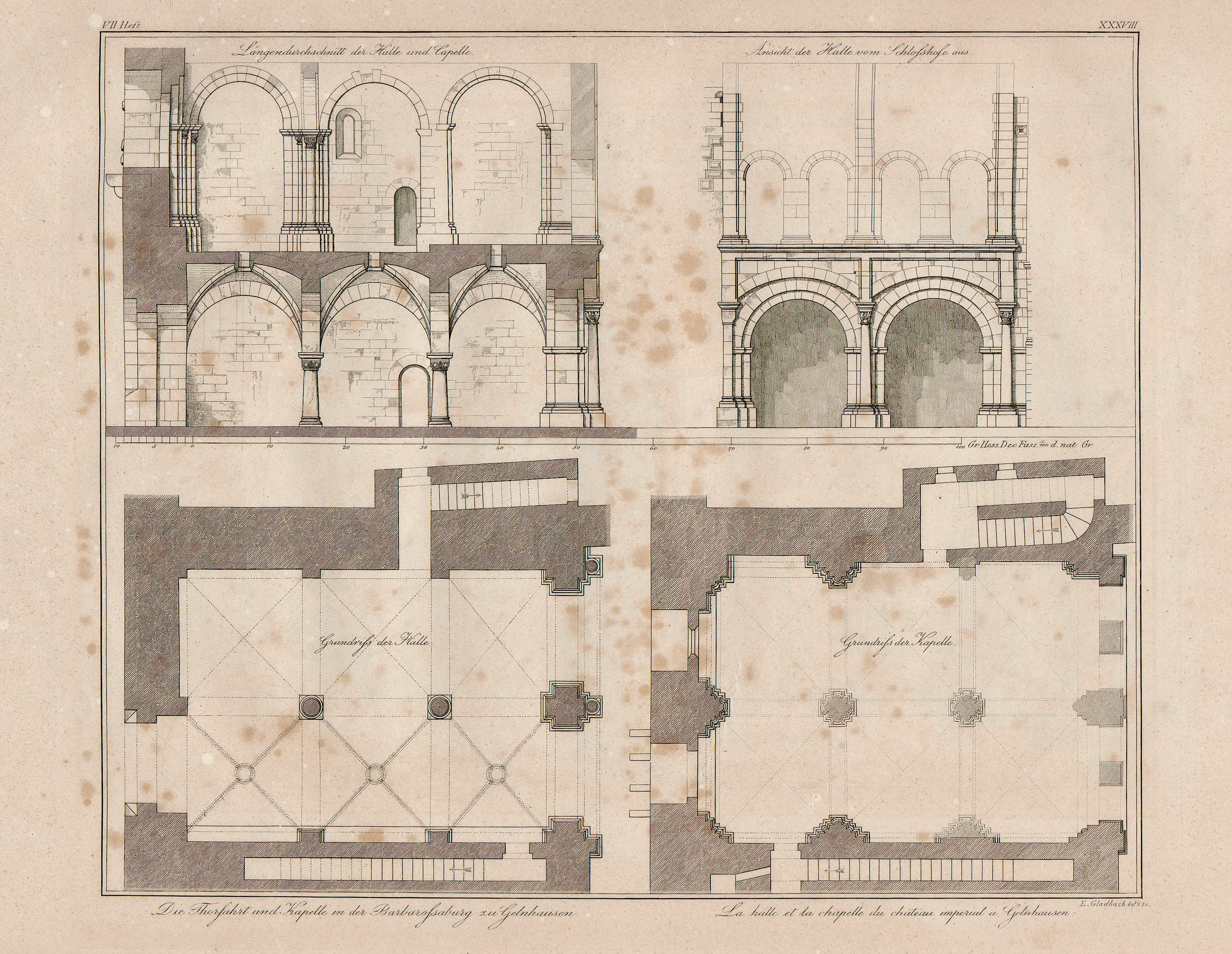
Hall and chapel of the Gelshausen Imperial Palace. From Denkmähler der deutschen Baukunst Band 3 (Volume 3).

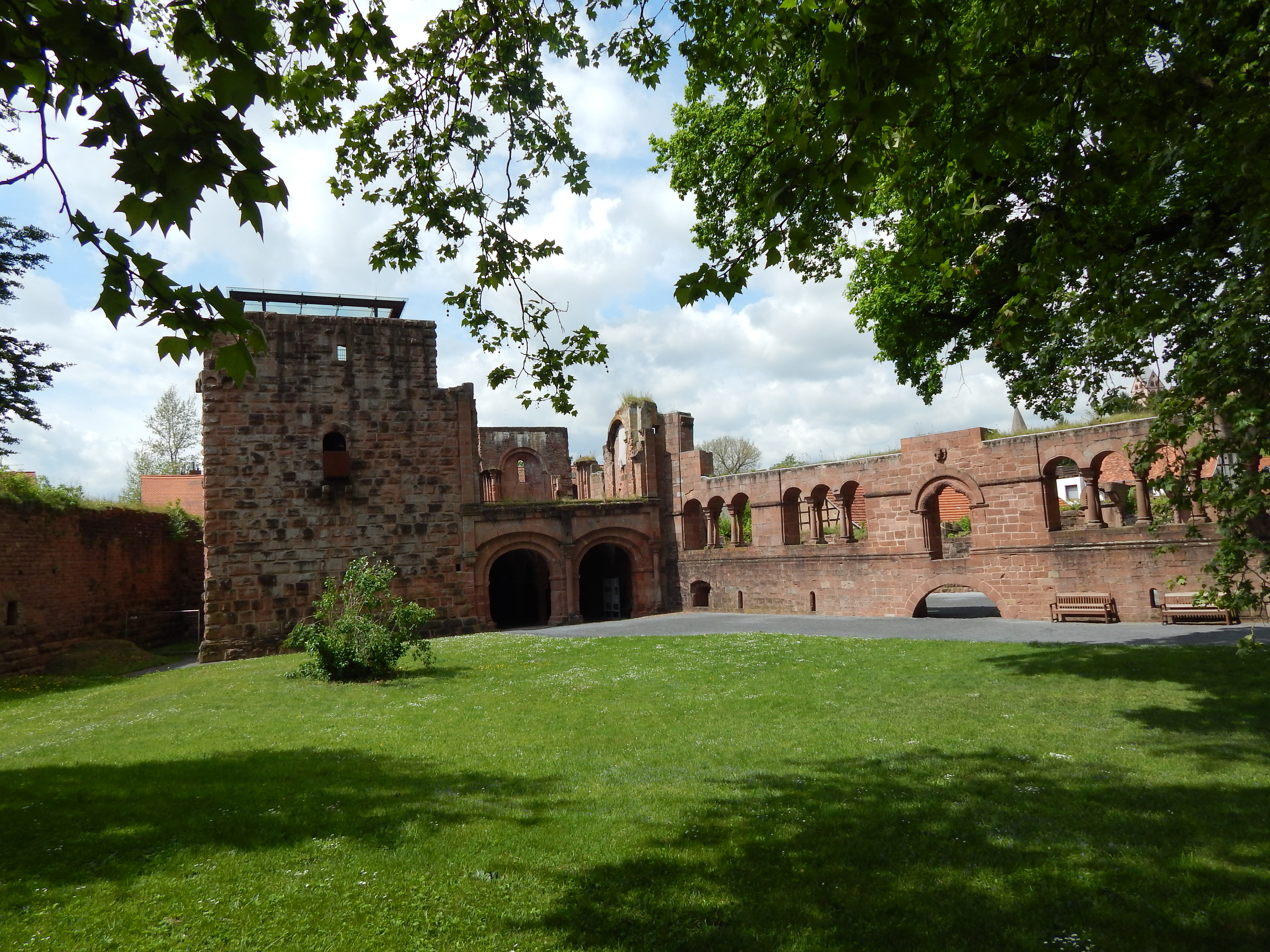
The ruins of the Gelshausen Imperial Palace

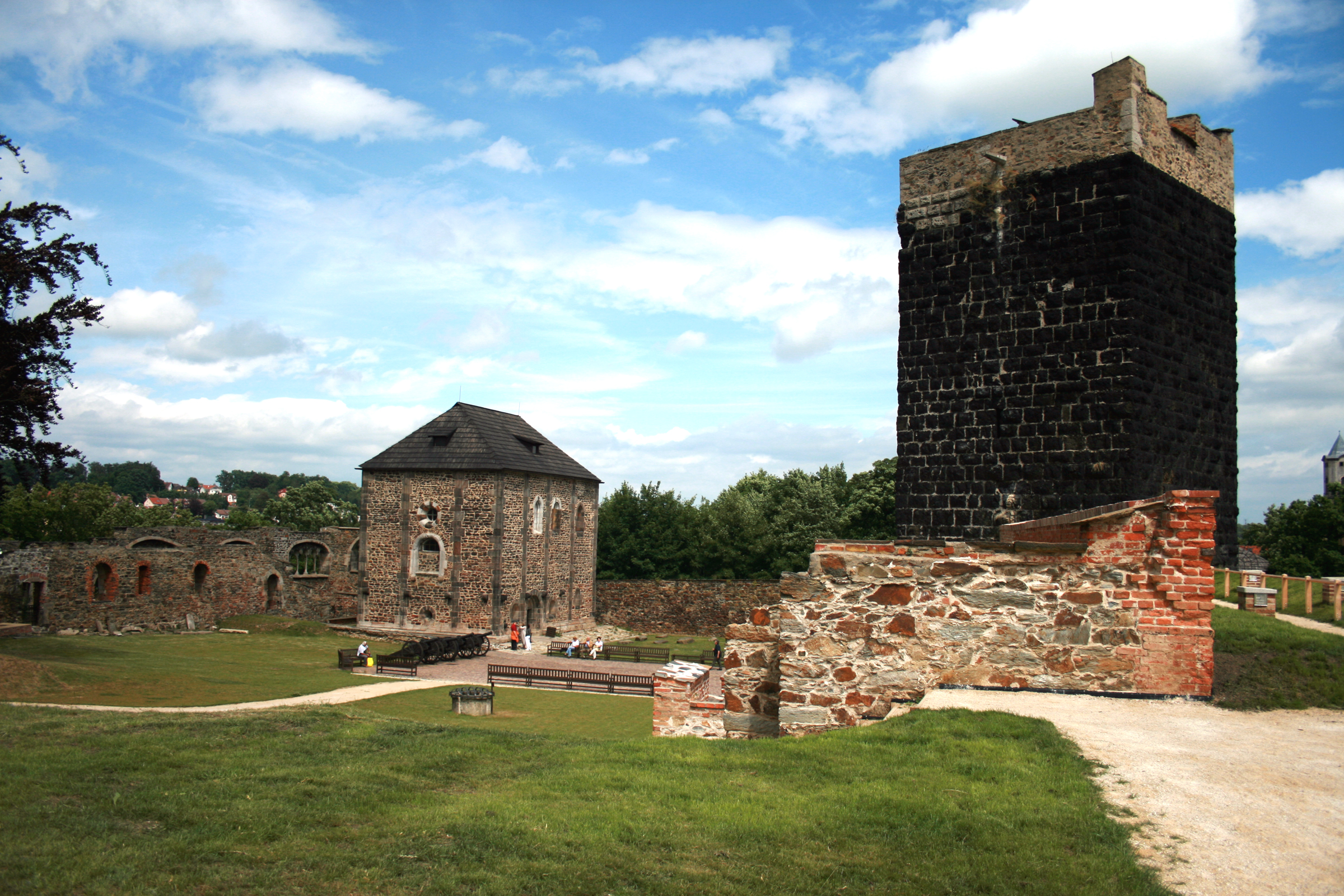
Eger Castle

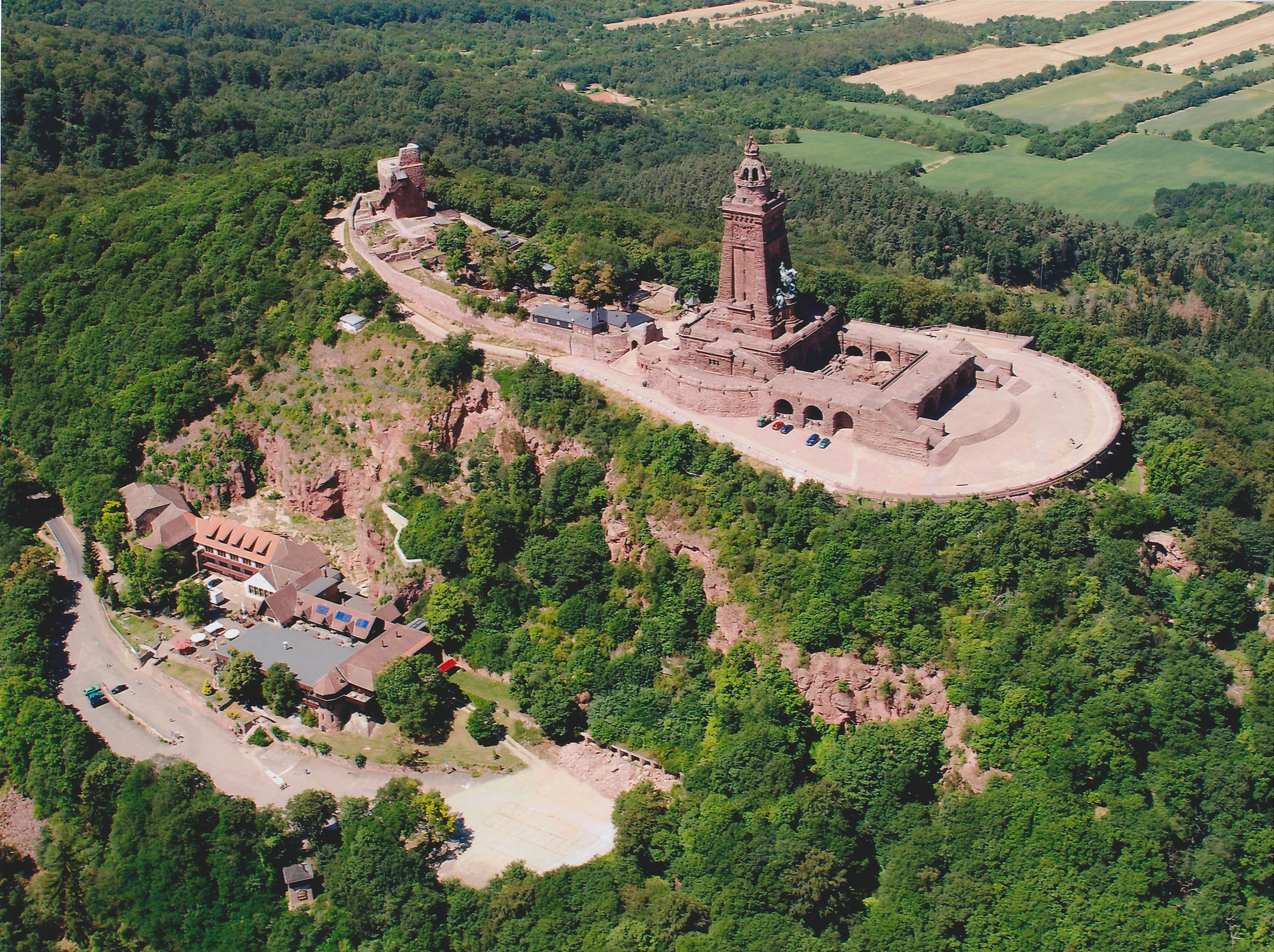
Kyffhäuser Castle with the Kyffhäuser Monument nearby

Architectural works of Barbarossa's era

=== Minnesang ===
After the wedding with Beatrice, together with the arrival of trouvères and troubadours like Guyot de Provins from Burgundy and Provence, the art of minnesang developed in Barbarossa's court. Early remarkable German Minnesänger incluđe Friedrich von Hausen, Bligger II von Steinach and Bernger von Horheim.

=== Architecture ===
Frederick was a great builder of palaces and public buildings.

- The Gelnhausen palace was built by Barbarossa as part of a plan to expand ancestral Hohenstaufen lands. The Grove Encyclopedia of Medieval Art and Architecture comments, "The great richness of the capitals and imposts at Gelnhausen points to southern France (e.g. La Daurade, Toulouse), and the arrangement of the engaged piers in the chapel is found there. A few motifs come from Lorraine. Yet all is combined into a unified whole of very high quality, suggesting the work of a brilliant master from the Upper Rhine who assimilated influences From southern France, Arles, and Toulouse, Autun, Alsace".
- The Eger fortress (Czech: Cheb): Around 1180–90, he built the Eger imperial fortress at an ancient Slavic settlement site. Characteristic of the idea of outward show of the Hohenstaufen era, it has a window arcade open to the outside, signifying the love of nature. The Black Tower and the double chapel still stand.

== Depictions in arts ==
=== Poems ===
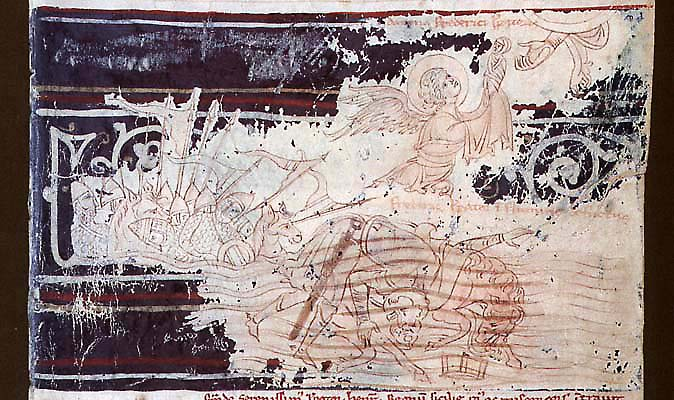
The scene of death of Frederick Barbarossa. Fol. 107r in Peter of Eboli (1195-1197's De Rebus Sicilis ). Bern, Stadtbibliothek, 120 II.Photograph Index of Medieval Art. Because Barbarossa died without confessing, the artist purposely portrayed the emperor's soul as an innocent child raised aloft by an angel who delivered him to the Hand of God. This was part of a concerted effort to protect Frederick's reputation as a noble Christian emperor.

- An unidentified poet, likely a citizen of the pro-imperial city of Bergamo, wrote The Song of the Deeds of Emperor Frederick in Lombardy. The text ends with the defeat of Frederick at the Battle of Carcano on 9 August 1160.
- The Archpoet, a famous contemporary, writes poems about the emperor.
- In the panegyric chronicle De Rebus Sicilis (1196) of Peter of Eboli, dedicated to Henry VI, Holy Roman Emperor (reigned 1190–97), Frederick's death is described in the following verses:

Already he sees the goal of his wishes [the Holy Land]
There he migrates in joy to Christ.

The accompanying illustration depicts an angel presenting the emperor's soul, as a baby, to the hand of God. At the same time, the physical body of Frederick is shown plunging into the water. The imperial crown already lies beneath water. John Freed writes that, "This jarring depiction and its ambivalent assessment of Frederick’s reign were soon covered up with a layer of paint that was not removed until the beginning of the twentieth century. The time is long overdue to uncover the prince beneath the myth."

- Christian Joseph Matzerath (1815–1876) wrote Kaiser Rotbarts Grab (Emperor Redbeard's grave).

=== Music ===
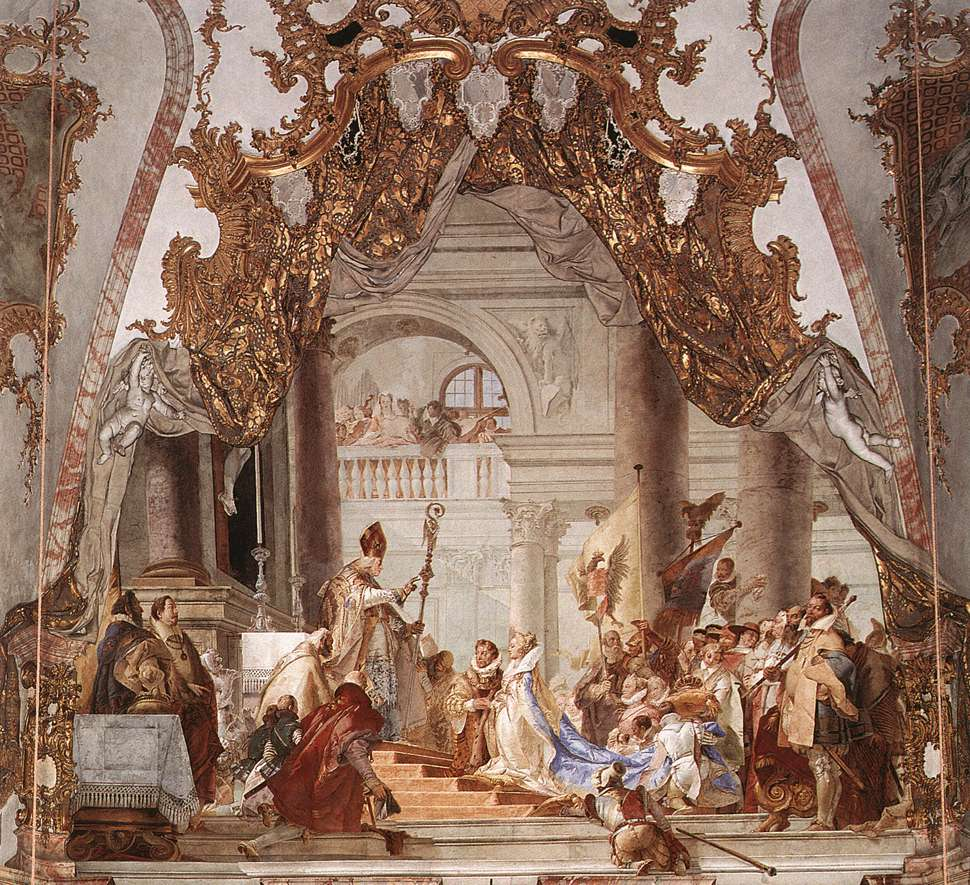
The Marriage of the Emperor Frederick I. Barbarossa to Beatrice of Burgundy (Hochzeit des Kaisers Friedrich I. Barbarossa und Beatrice von Burgund by Giovanni Battista Tiepolo, 1751. When Beatrice married Frederick, she brought her personal trouvère to his court.

German minnesang tradition began under the reign of Frederick and was inspired by his Crusade as well as his considerable art patronage (and also, the French troubadour tradition of the time), although they were not exhortative or political songs and tended to be love songs instead. Minnesingers such as Friedrich von Hausen depicted Frederick and his court in their works.

- Der alte Barbarossa, published in 1813 by the poet Friedrich Rückert (1788–1866), is a famous poem about the emperor who sleeps in the mountain, likely influenced by anti-Napoleon sentiments. Music is by Joseph Gersbach.
- Gustav Pressel (1827–1890) composed the notable ballad Barbarossa about the emperor.
- In 1888–1889, Siegmund von Hausegger composed a large work, the symphonic poem Barbarossa, also inspired by the Kyffhäuser legend and containing three movements.

=== Theatrical works ===
- La battaglia di Legnano: The opera by Giuseppe Verdi (music) and Salvadore Cammarano (libretto) was about the 1176 defeat of Frederick by the army of the Lombard League.
- Ernst Raupach (1784 – 1852) wrote four plays about Fredrick, one of his sixteen plays about the Hohenstaufens.
- Christian Dietrich Grabbe wrote the tragedy Kaiser Friedrich Barbarossa as part of his Hohenstaufen cycle in 1829.
- Der Untersberg (The Untersberg) is a Singspiel with three acts by Johann Nepomuk Poissl with libretto by Eduard von Schenk, first performed on October 30, 1829, in Munich. The setting of this work is the mountain near Salzburg inside which the emperor is supposedly asleep.
- Friedrich der Rothbart in Suza oder vassalentreue is an 1841 liederspiel about Frederick, written by Johanna Kinkel with libretto by Gottfried Kinkel.
- Frederick is a main character Gervinus, der Narr vom Untersberg oder Ein patriotischer Wunsch is an 1849 opera by Franz von Suppé (the title character Gervinus is his court fool).
- Federico Barbarossa a Redona, ed Ezzelino terzo, drammi. [In verse.] is an 1851 drama (written in verses) by Cesare Campori.
- Richard Wagner connected the two heroes Siegfried and Barbarossa, considering the latter as the second coming of the former. Originally he intended to write an opera about the emperor, mixing Germanic and medieval elements, but in 1848 he decided to write about Siegfried instead.

=== Visual arts ===
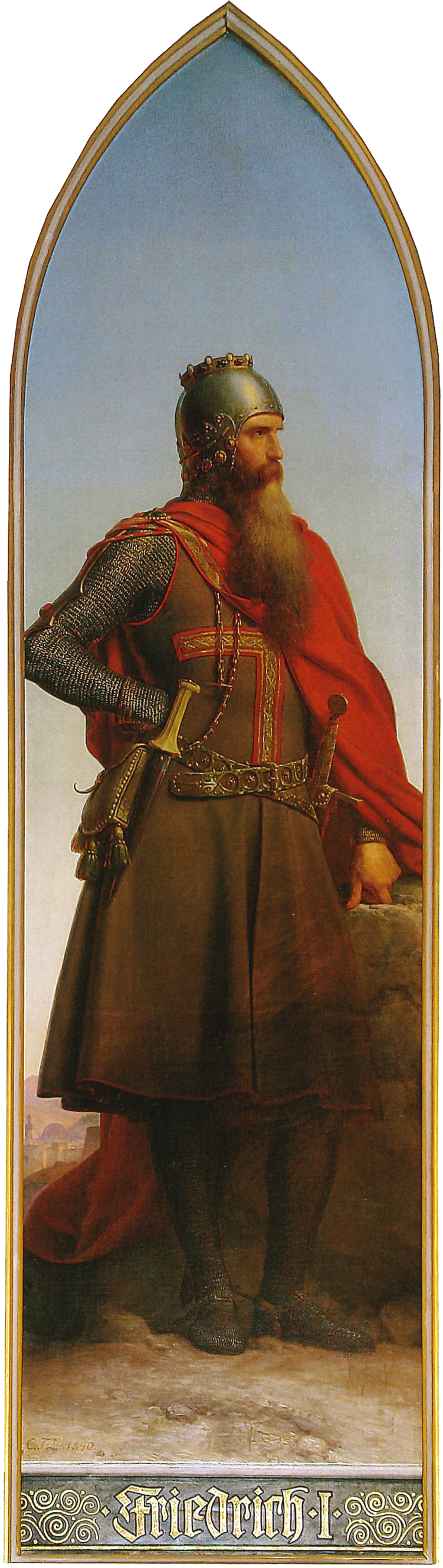
Kaisersaal Frankfurt am Main, Nr. 19 - Friedrich I., (Carl Friedrich Lessing)

- As the Wittelsbach Dynasty's rise was closely linked to the emperor, in 1166, they integrated an eagle, that represents both the Empire and the Count Palatine of Bavaria, into their coat-of-arms. In 1180, Frederick installed Otto on the ducal throne.
- There is a limestone carved figure, male and crowned, either Frederick Barbarossa or his grandson Frederick II, at the Castello di Lagopesole (Italy). This was made between 1242 and 1250.
- Emperor Frederick Barbarossa receiving the entreaties of his son for peace, around 1409–1415, was a drawing that reflects the composition of scenes commissioned by the Council oF Ten to Pisanello for the Great Council Hall of the Doge's Palace in Venice.
- Humiliation of Frederick I Barbarossa by Pope Alexander III was a painting commissioned by the Venetian government, originally painted by Giovanni Bellini. In 1516, after Bellini's death, the commission was transferred to Titian. This one was destroyed by fire in the 1570s. Giorgione might have been a part of the project.
- Tintoretto painted the scene of Barbarossa being crowned by Pope Adrian IV, according to Giorgio Vasari.
- Around 1552–1568, Italian artist Cristofano dell'Altissimo painted a portrait of Frederick Barbarossa.
- In 1589, Jan van der Straet, called Stradanus created the engraving The deer hunt of Frederick I Barbarossa and Ubaldino Ubaldini.
- In 1596, Haarlem commissioned a tapestry depicting Emperor Barbarossa and the Patriarch of Jerusalem bestowing Haarlem with an Augmentation of its Arms. The designer was the Haarlem painter Pieter de Grebber. The tapestry corresponds to a painting of the same subject, also painted by De Grebber made for the Haarlem townhall. Both the tapestry and the painting show the presents bestowed by Emperor Barbarossa and the patriarch of Jerusalem (a silver sword and the Holy Cross) on the city.
- Sant'Ubaldo e Federico Barbarossa (Saint Ubald of Gubbio and Frederick Barbarossa) is a 1683 painting by Ciro Ferri.
- Frederick's famous portrait in the Kaisersaal in Frankfurt am Main is part of a series depicting emperors who reigned from 768 to 1806 (created from 1839 to 1853). This portrait is painted by Karl Friedrich Lessing (1808–1880) in 1840. On the ceiling of the Kaisersaal, there is a fresco depicting Beatrice of Burgundy being brought by Apollo as a bride to Frederick, painted by Giovanni Battista Tiepolo (1696–1770) in 1751. Another fresco on the ceiling by the same artist is Hochzeit des Kaisers Friedrich I. Barbarossa und Beatrice von Burgund depicting the marriage of Frederick and Beatrice.

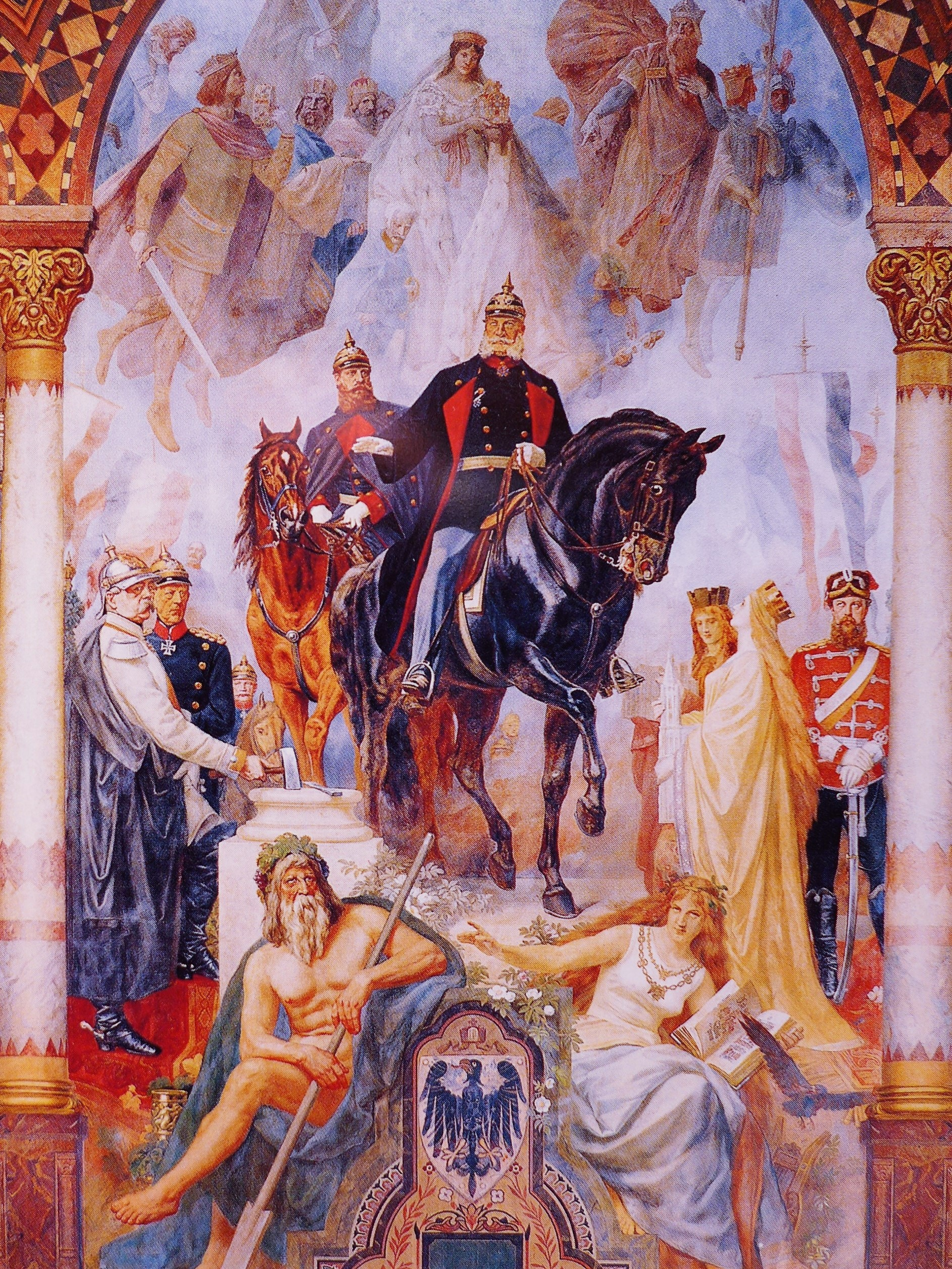
Reichsgründung 1871, or Proclamation of the Reich, by Wislicenus. Freed remarks that Frederick is depicted the same way as God the Father at the Baptism of Jesus.

- Other than the Kyffhäuser Monument mentioned above, during the early years of the German Empire, an iconographical program which associated Frederick with Wilhelm I was carried out in Goslar, centred on the old Kaiserpfalz (Imperial Palace). A famous equestrian statue of Frederick Barbarossa, built by Robert Toberentz (1849–1895) in 1893–1895 and erected until 1900, stands in Goslar, with Wilhelm's statue standing nearby (Frederick on the North, Wilhelm on the South). The Kaiserpfalz was decorated with paintings depicting the life of Frederick too, presided over by Johannes Wislicenus, who combined history wỉth fairytale (the German nation as the Sleeping Beauty, or Dornröschen) and saga (the Barbarossa legend), the medieval with the modern. In The proclamation of the Reich, Frederick looked down with approval at the proclamation while Queen Luise was presented as Germania. Other paintings in this program include: Barbarossas Erwachen (Barbarossa awakened), Barbarossas Fußfall vor Heinrich dem Löwen (Barbarossa falling on his knees in front of Henry the Lion, which describes Frederick begging Henry at Chiavenna for military aid against the Lombards in 1176.), Barbarossas Sieg bei Ikonium (Barbarosa's victory in Iconium), Heinrich der Löwe bittet Barbarossa um Verzeihung (Henry the Lion begged Barbarossa for forgiveness, which describes the event in Erfurt in 1181).
- L'Imperatore Federico Barbarossa, durante il lungo assedio di Alessandria, avendo tentato d'impadronirsi per sorpresa della città, ne viene cacciato dal popolo (1174). Federico Barbarossa cacciato da Alessandria (Frederick Barbarossa expelled from Alexandria) is an 1851 painting by Carlo Arienti.
- Friedrich Barbarossa 1157 zu Besançon, den Streit der Parteien schlichtend (depicting the emperor trying to separate two conflicting parties – here Otto von Wittelsbach, 1120–1183, wants to physically attack the papal legates) is a painting (1859), by Hermann Freihold Plüddemann (1809–1868).
- Julius Schnorr von Carolsfeld (1794–1872) created several depictions of the emperor, among them the engraving Friedrich Barbarossas Tod (Death of Barbarossa); the painting The Sleep of Emperor Frederick Barbarossa; Einzug Friedrich Barbarossas in Mailand (Frederick Barbarossa entering Milan) (1839/40, encaustic, carton, 585x631 cm, now destroyed).

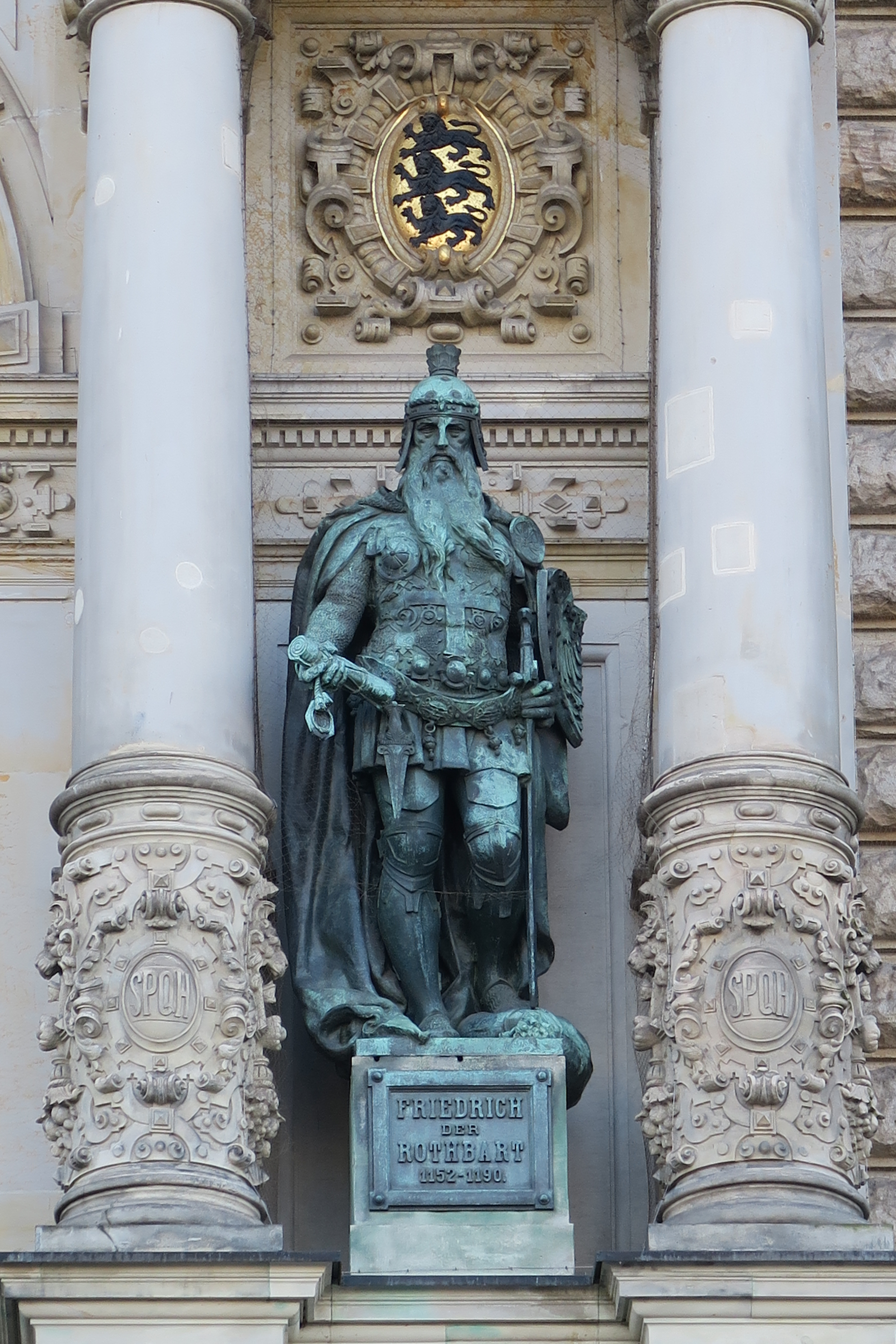
Barbarossa's statue at the Rathaus in Hamburg.

- There was a hall name Barbarossasaal in the Royal Palace of Bavaria at Munich, with paintings commissioned by King Ludwig I of Bavaria and depicting Barbarossa's life (painted by Johann Georg Hiltensperger, Ludwig Michael Schwanthaler, Joseph Karl Stieler and Schnorr): his election as emperor, the entry into Milan, the banishment of Henry the Lion, the installation of Otto of Wittelsbach, his reconciliation with Pope Alexander III, imperial festival at Mayence, the Battle of Iconium, his death. Reliefs were done by Schwanthaler. There is also a Barbarossa Hall at the Castle of Lenzburg, once the emperor's residence.
- Peter Janssen's Herzog Heinrich der Löwe vor Barbarossa depicting Henry kneeling in front of Frederick.
- Around 1862, Filippo Carcano painted the Federico Barbarossa e il duca Enrico il Leone a Chiavenna. Federico Barbarossa e il duca Enrico il Leone a Chiavenna (Frederick Barbarossa and Duke Henry the Lion in Chiavenna).
- In 1892, in 1892, Konstanz's sculptor Hans Baur (1829–1897), won the competition to build a fountain to replace the then dilapidated fountain in the Marktstätte. Baur built a red sandstone four-sided stele or obelisk at the centre of a granite basin of the fountain, now called Kaiserbrunnen (Imperial Fountain). Four great German emperors, representing four great ruling dynasties were chosen: Heinrich III (Franks), Friedrich Barbarossa (Hohenstaufen), Maximilian I (Habsburg) und Wilhelm I (Hohenzollern). The choices and manners of depicting the emperors were considered traditional. When the new fountain was unveiled on 30 October 1897, Bauer had died six months before. Later, the portraits were melted down during wartime. In 1993, new imperial portraits were made by Gernot and Barbara Rumpf. Maximilian (now together with his unloved empress Bianca Maria Sforza), and Frederick Barbarossa returned, depicted in a caricatural manner, while Otto I was introduced (depicted seriously). Barbarossa's figure is fused with that of a large fish, seemingly symbolizing his water-related death. Emperor Wilhelm I was replaced with a pigeon, perhaps symbolizing peace.
- Frederick's statue at the city hall in Nijmegen is part of a group depicting Trajan, Charlemagne, the anti-king William of Holland, Henry VII of Luxembourgh, Emperor Charles IV and Charles V.
- Madonna di Provenzano con Federico Barbarossa e Alessandro III is a 1959 palio painting by Vasco Valacchi describing Frederick kneeling in front of Pope Alexander III beside the figure of Madonna of Provenzano.
- Madonna di Provenzano con Federico Barbarossa e Alessandro III is a 1981 palio painting by Mario Ghezzi on the same subject.
- On the occasion of the 800th anniversary of the Mainz Imperial Festival and the Diet of Pentecost 1184, Erwin Mosen's team created a Barbarossa monument (2m in height; the emperor is shown flanked by his two sons in Mainz.

=== Novels ===
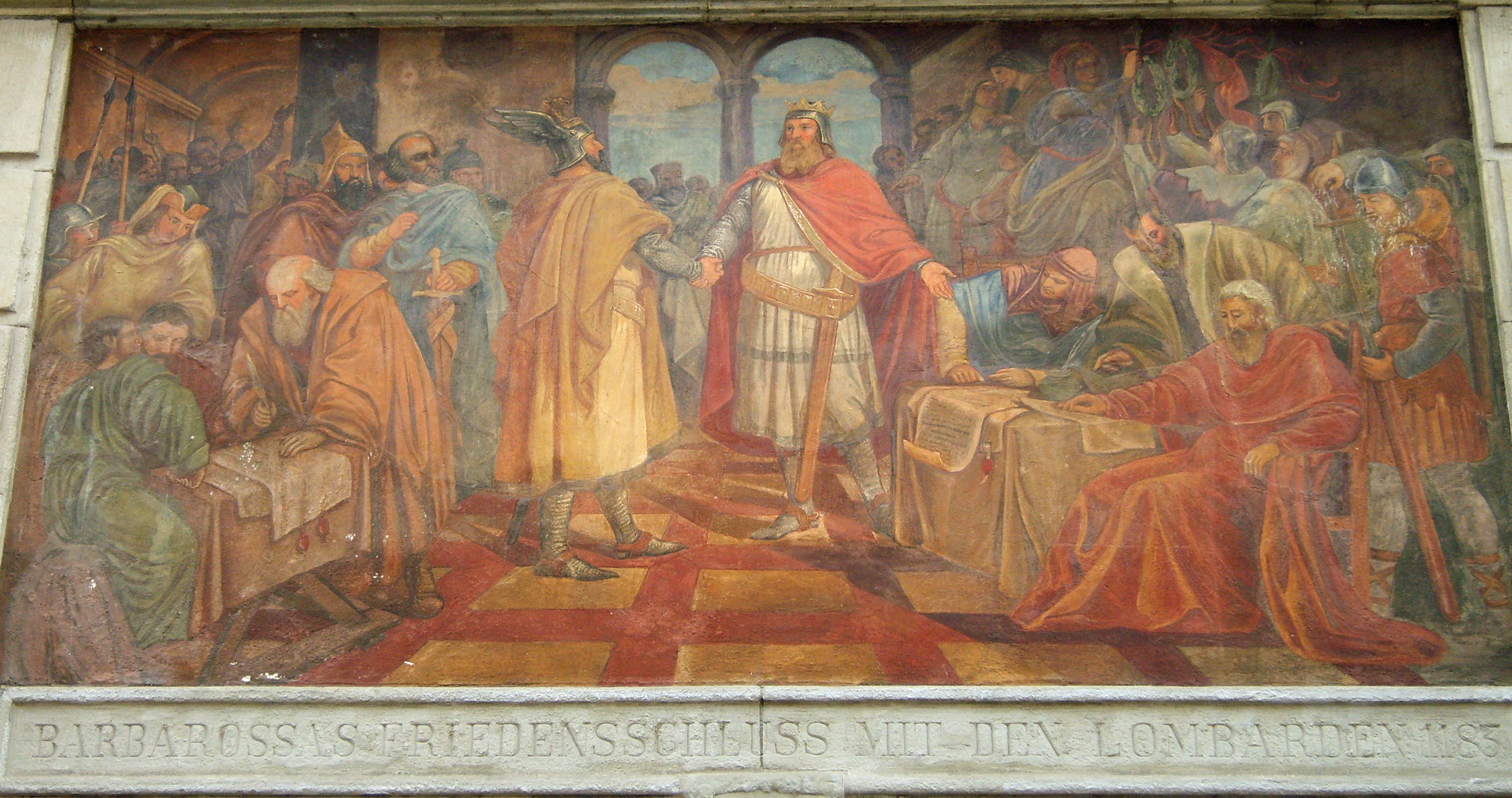
Peace of Constance with the Lombards, fresco, Rathaus, Konstanz

- He is a character in the fictional work La Religieuse by Marie-Catherine de Villedieu (1640–1683). In the story, he acted as a benefactor of a convent to court a beautiful nun who lived there.
- Friedrich's des Ersten letzte Lebenstage is an 1858 novel by Julius Bacher about the last days of the emperor.
- Federico Barbarossa all'assedio di Crema romanzo storico is an 1873 novel by the Italian writer and playwright Pietro Saraceni.
- Karl Hans Strobl wrote the novel Kaiser Rotbart in 1935, using the life of the emperor to provide a framework to desbribe the early German Middle Age.
- Barbarossa is a novel about the emperor by Conrad von Bolanden.
- Kaiser Friedrich Barbarossa: Historischer Roman is a 1954 novel about Frederick by Heinrich Bauer (1896–1975).
- Frederick is an important character in Wie ein Falke im Sturm. In this novel, he was served by the young nobleman Ditho who tracked down an assassin who tried to kill him.

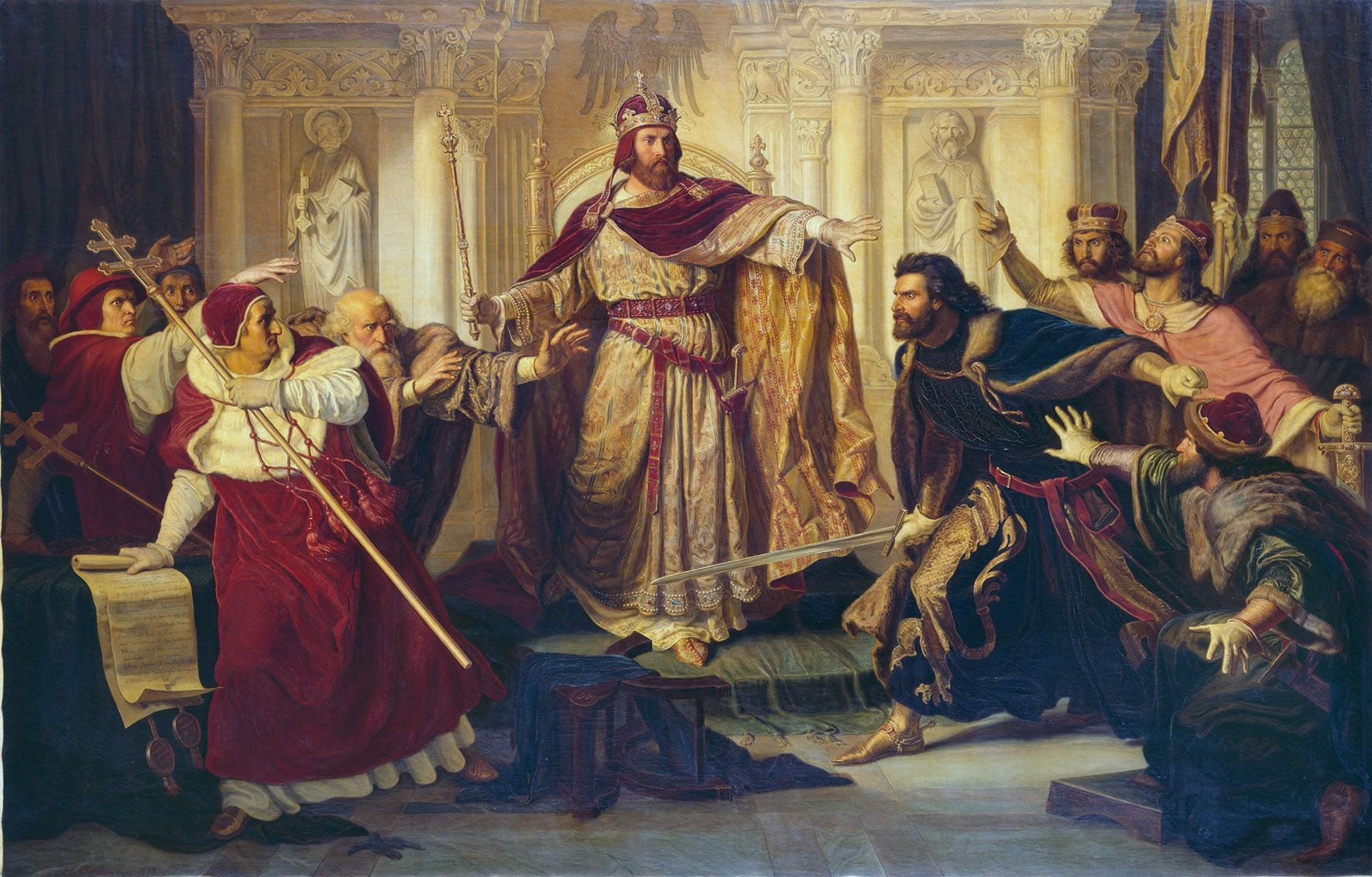
Friedrich Barbarossa at Besançon, by Hermann Plüddemann (1859)

- Baudolino is a 2011 novel by Umberto Eco. The story is about the young farmer Baudolino, Frederick (Federico Barbarossa)'s godson.
- Sabine Ebert (born 1958) writes a five-book saga on Frederick, which includes:
  - Schwert und Krone – Meister der Täuschung. Droemer Knaur, München 2017, ISBN 978-3-426-65412-5
  - Schwert und Krone – Der junge Falke. Droemer Knaur, München 2017, ISBN 978-3-426-65413-2
  - Schwert und Krone – Zeit des Verrats. Droemer Knaur, München 2018, ISBN 978-3-426-65445-3
  - Schwert und Krone – Herz aus Stein. Droemer Knaur, München 2019, ISBN 978-3-426-22662-9
  - Schwert und Krone – Preis der Macht. Droemer Knaur, München 2020, ISBN 978-3-426-22710-7
- Adler und Löwe: Friedrich Barbarossa und Heinrich der Löwe im Kampf um die Macht is a 2021 novel about Frederick and Henry the Lion by Paul Barz.
- Le fils chartreux de Barberousse is a 2015 novel by Annie Maas about Terric, the natural son of Barbarossa.
- Barbarossa - Im Schatten des Kaisers: Historischer Roman is a 2022 novel about Arndt von Cappenberg, who served Frederick but loved Beatrice, by Michael Peinkofer.

=== Films ===
- Frederick is portrayed by Amleto Novelli in the 1910 Italian film Federico Barbarossa, also named La Bataille de Legnano, directed by Mario Caserini. The film ends with Frederick being fatally wounded in battle by Alberto da Giussano.
- In Vision (2009 film), a movie directed by Margarethe von Trotta, he is played by Devid Striesow.
- Barbarossa (film) (also released as Barbarossa: Siege Lord or Sword of War) is a 2009 Italian English-language film set primarily in Northern Italy during the late 12th century. Despite the film's title, Friedrich "Barbarossa" played by Rutger Hauer features only as a supporting character in this film, which is primarily concerned with the struggle of the Lombard League, which struggled to maintain independence from the Holy Roman Empire, led by the legendary Guelph warrior Alberto da Giussano.

==== TV series ====
- The emperor was dramatized in season 1, episode 3 of the ZDF documentary Die Deutschen, titled Barbarossa und der Löwe (Barbarossa and the Lion, 2010).

== Barbarossa cities ==
There are several cities associating themselves with the memory of the emperor (called Barbarossasttadt, or Barbarossa city). The cities usually mentioned include Sinzig, Kaiserslautern, Gelnhausen, Altenburg, Bad Frankenhausen, but Annweiler am Trifels, Bad Wimpfen, Eberbach and Waiblingen consider themselves as such as well.

== Events ==
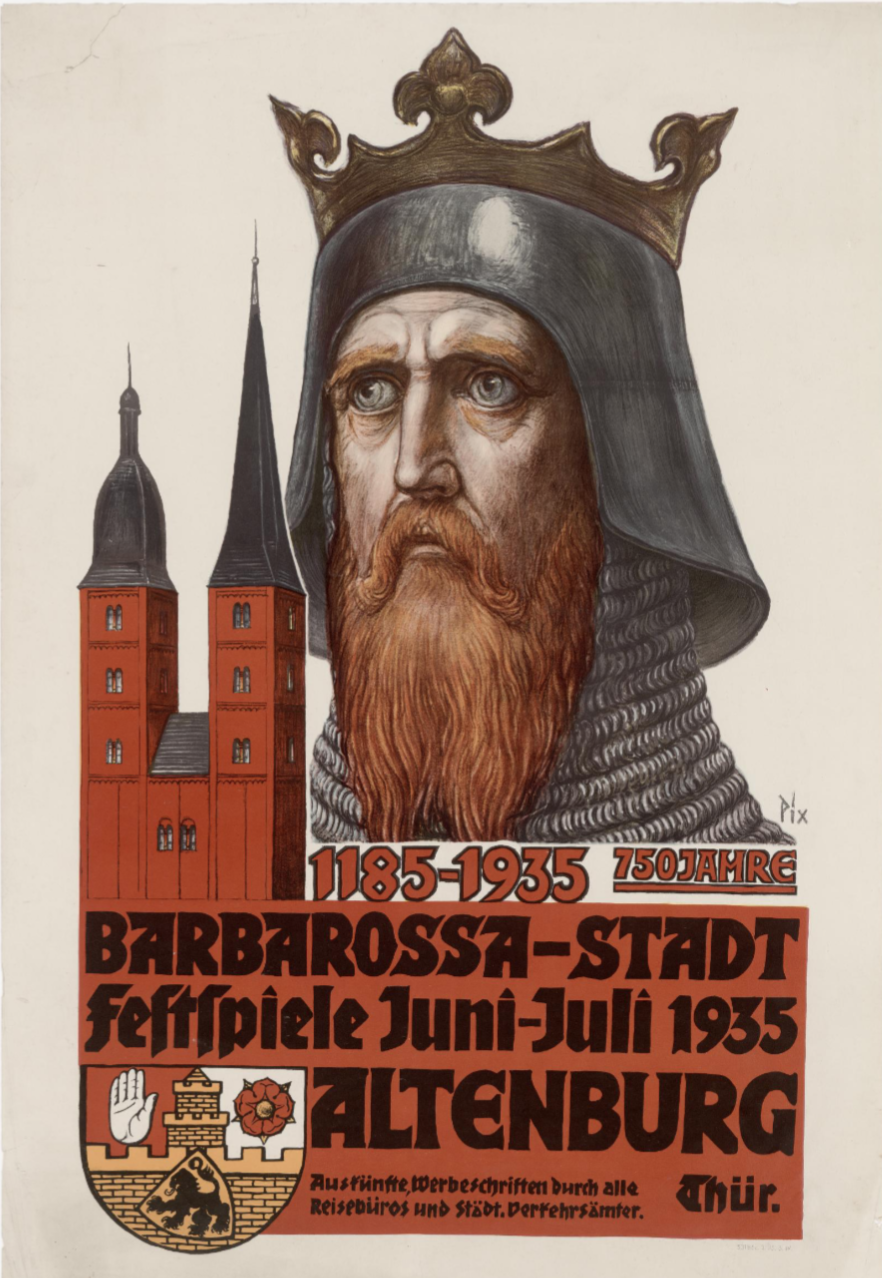
Poster of the Barbarossa-Stadt Altenburg Festival June - July 1935, designed by Otto Pech.

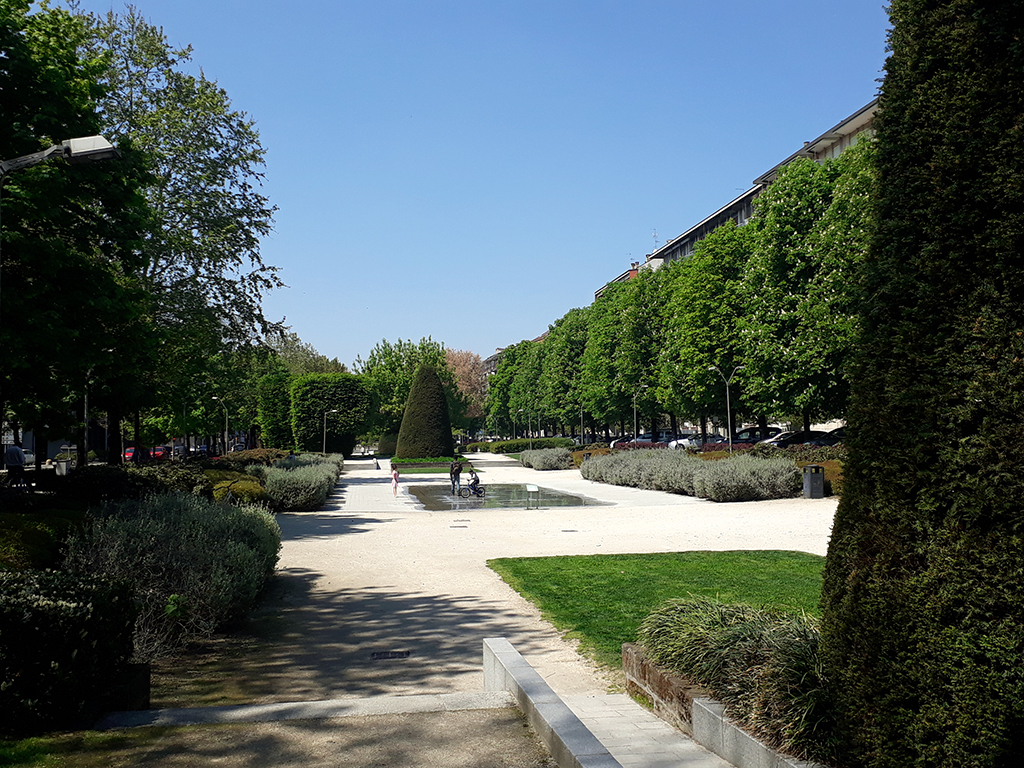
The public garden Federico Barbarossa in Lodi.

There are various medieval festivals associated with Frederick and the Hohenstaufen dynasty in Germany, with some of the notable ones including:

- The Barbarossa Spectaculum, a great biennial medieval festival organized at the Marienberg Fortress in Würzburg.
- The Barbarossa Festspiel in Altenburg.
- The Stauferspektakel in Göppingen.
- The Staufer-Spektakel in Waiblingen.

Since 1981, Como organized the Palio del Baradello, in which various villages competed to win the Pallium, a silk drape that is hand-painted by various artists from Como every year.

2022 is the 900th commemoration year of the birth of Frederick Barbarossa. Recently in Selm, a stele has been created to commemorate the emperor. Events like exhibitions and festivals about Frederick have been planned in various German localities, including a celebration at the Barbarossa Cave.

Recently, to commemorate the emperor, the Supply Battalion 131 (called "Battalion Barbarossa") of the Kyffhäuser barracks (Kyffhäuser-Kaserne, Bundeswehr built a huge ground artwork in Bad Frankenhausen, which uses among other things 300 roles of fabric (each was 100 meters long). The mission is named Rotbart ("Redbeard").

== See also ==
- Cultural depictions of Frederick II, Holy Roman Emperor
- Cultural depictions of Otto I, Holy Roman Emperor
- Cultural depictions of Otto III, Holy Roman Emperor
- Cultural depictions of Conrad II, Holy Roman Emperor
- Cultural depictions of Charles IV, Holy Roman Emperor
- Cultural depictions of Sigismund, Holy Roman Emperor
- Cultural depictions of Maximilian I, Holy Roman Emperor
- Cultural depictions of Charles V, Holy Roman Emperor
- Imperial Palace of Goslar
- Wilhelm I, German Emperor
- Barbarossa Palace, Gelnhausen
- Barbarossa city
- Barbarossa Cave
- Kyffhäuser Monument
- Lenzburg Castle
- Kaiserbrunnen in Konstanz (German Wiki)

== Bibliography and further reading ==
- Arnaldi, Girolamo; Arnaldi, Professor Emeritus of Medieval History Girolamo (2005). Italy and Its Invaders. Harvard University Press. ISBN 978-0-674-01870-9.
- Beck, Georg (1990). Friedrich I. Barbarossa zum 800. Todestag (in German). Magistrat.
- Brown, R. A. (1972). The Origins of Modern Europe. Boydell Press.
- Cantor, N. F. (1969). Medieval History. Macmillan and Company. ISBN 978-0-02-319070-4.
- Cardini, Franco (1990). Friedrich I. Barbarossa: Kaiser des Abendlandes (in German). Verlag Styria. ISBN 978-3-222-11971-2.
- Carson, Thomas (1994). Barbarossa in Italy: Carmen de Gestis Frederici I. Imperatoris in Lombardia. Italica Press. ISBN 978-0-934977-30-2.
- Drescher, Michael Rodegang (31 December 2016). Poets of Protest: Mythological Resignification in American Antebellum and German Vormärz Literature. transcript Verlag. ISBN 978-3-8394-3745-2.
- Elliott, Gillian (June 2005). "Review of Mierow, Charles Christopher, ed., The Deeds of Frederick Barbarossa". H-German, H-Review.
- Fomenko, Anatoly T. (2005). History: Fiction Or Science?. Mithec. p. 218. ISBN 978-2-913621-06-0.
- Freed, John (19 June 2016a). Frederick Barbarossa: The Prince and the Myth. Yale University Press. ISBN 978-0-300-22116-9.
- Giesebrecht (1895). Geschichte der deutschen Kaiserzeit (in German). Schwetschke.
- Görich, Knut (2001). Die Ehre Friedrich Barbarossas: Kommunikation, Konflikt und politisches Handeln im 12. Jahrhundert (in German). Wissenschaftliche Buchgesellschaft. ISBN 978-3-534-15168-4.
- Görich, Knut (22 November 2011). Friedrich Barbarossa: Eine Biographie (in German). C.H.Beck. p. 217. ISBN 978-3-406-62149-9.
- Jarausch, K. H. (1997). After Unity; Reconfiguring German Identities. New York: Berghahn Books. ISBN 1-57181-041-2.
- Laudage, Johannes (2009). Friedrich Barbarossa (1152-1190): eine Biografie (in German). F. Pustet. ISBN 978-3-7917-2167-5.
- Le Goff, J. (2000). Medieval Civilization, 400–1500. New York: Barnes and Noble.
- Loud, G. A. (16 March 2016). The Crusade of Frederick Barbarossa: The History of the Expedition of the Emperor Frederick and Related Texts. Routledge. ISBN 978-1-317-03685-2.
- Manselli, Raoul; Riedmann, Josef, eds. (1982). Federico Barbarossa nel dibattito storiografico in Italia e in Germania. Bologna: Il Mulino.
- Munz, Peter (1969). Frederick Barbarossa; a Study in Medieval Politics. Cornell University Press. ISBN 978-0-8014-0511-2.
- Opll, Ferdinand (1978). Das Itinerar Kaiser Friedrich Barbarossas (1152-1190) (in German). Böhlau. ISBN 978-3-205-08715-1.
- Opll, Ferdinand (1990). Friedrich Barbarossa (in German). Wissenschaftliche Buchgesellschaft. pp. 299–308. ISBN 978-3-534-04131-2.
- Otto I, Bishop of Freising; Mierow, Charles Christopher (2004). The deeds of Frederick Barbarossa. New York: Columbia University Press. ISBN 978-0-231-13419-4.
- Otto I. (Bishop of Freising); Emery, Richard Wilder (1994). The Deeds of Frederick Barbarossa. University of Toronto Press. ISBN 978-0-8020-7574-1.
- Novobatzky, Peter; Shea, Ammon (2001). Depraved and Insulting English. Orlando: Harcourt. ISBN 978-0-15-601149-5.
- Patze, Hans. "Frederick I - Legacy - Britannica". www.britannica.com.
- Stürner, Wolfgang (2020). Die Staufer (1. Auflage ed.). Stuttgart: Verlag W. Kohlhammer. ISBN 9783170353657.
- Venetz, David (2008). Kaiser Friedrich I. Barbarossa: Tod und Mythos (in German). GRIN Verlag. ISBN 978-3-638-94072-6.
- Walford, Edward; Cox, John Charles; Apperson, George Latimer (1885). "Digit folklore, part II". The Antiquary. XI: 119–123.
- Wies, Ernst Wilhelm (1990). Kaiser Friedrich Barbarossa: Mythos und Wirklichkeit : Biographie (in German). Bechtle. ISBN 978-3-7628-0494-9.
