= Toberentz =

Toberentz is a surname originating from Germany. Notable people with the surname include:

- Christian Toberentz (born 1955), German (voice) actor, singer, and dance teacher
- Lotte Toberentz (1900–unknown), German concentration camp overseer
- Robert Toberentz (1849–1895), German sculptor
