= Obergailbach =

- Commune
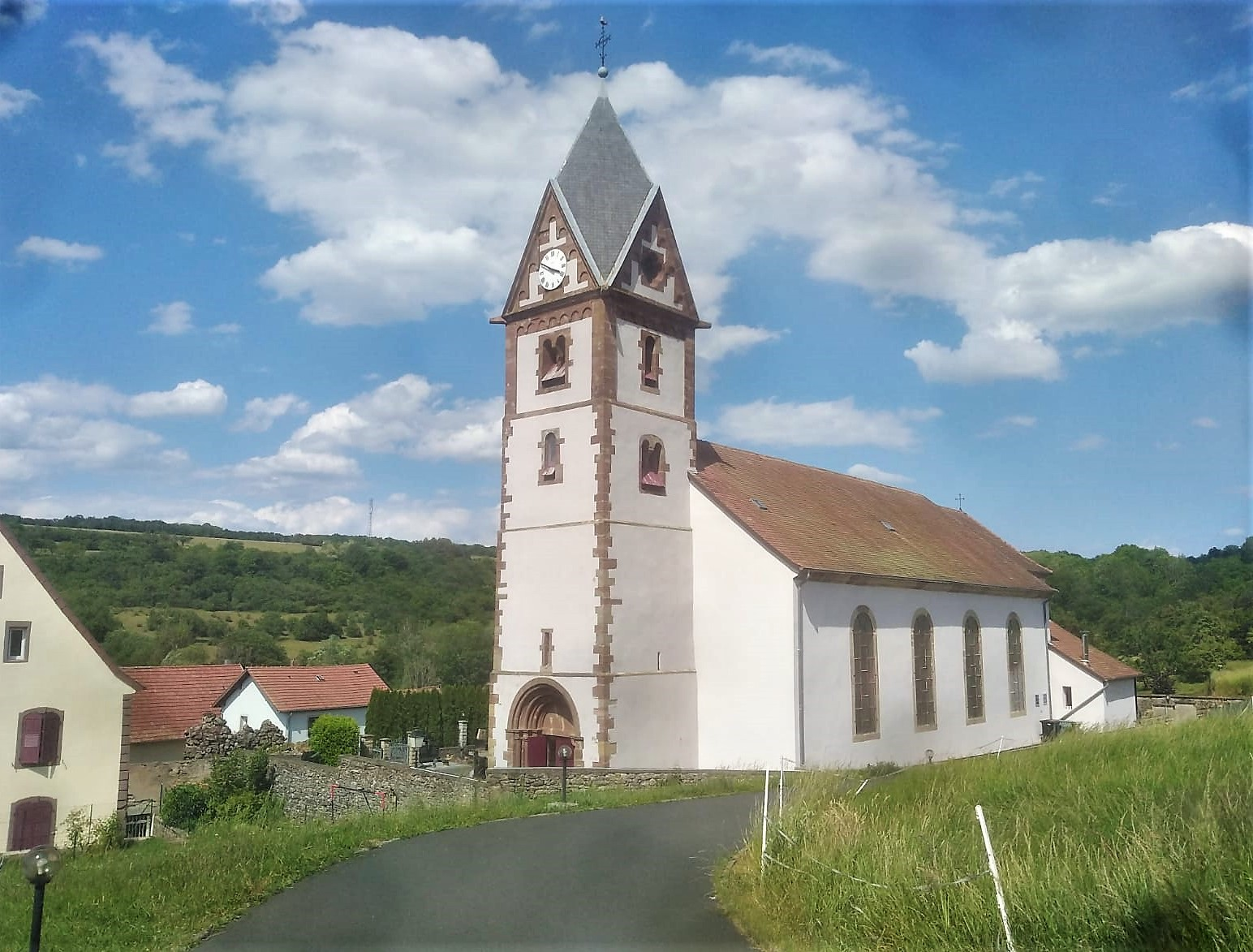
- Saint-Maurice church in Obergailbach

- Coat of arms
- Location of Obergailbach
- Location within France Location within Grand Est
- Coordinates: 49°07′07″N 7°13′07″E
- Country: France
- Region: Grand Est
- Department: Moselle
- Arrondissement: Sarreguemines
- Canton: Bitche
- Intercommunality: Pays de Bitche

Government
  - Mayor (2020–2026): Jean-Marc Hoellinger
- Area^{1}: 8.99 km^{2} (3.47 sq mi)
- Elevation: 120 m (390 ft)
- Highest elevation: 387 m (1,270 ft)
- Lowest elevation: 234 m (768 ft)
- Population (2023): 268
  - Density: 29.8/km^{2} (77.2/sq mi)
- Time zone: UTC+01:00 (CET)
  - Summer (DST): UTC+02:00 (CEST)
- INSEE/Postal code: 57517 /57720
- ^{1} French Land Register data, which excludes lakes, ponds, glaciers > 1 km^{2} (0.386 sq mi or 247 acres) and river estuaries.

Obergailbach (French pronunciation: [obəʁɡailbax]; Lorraine Franconian: Owergäälbach) is a commune in the Moselle department of the Grand Est administrative region in north-eastern France.

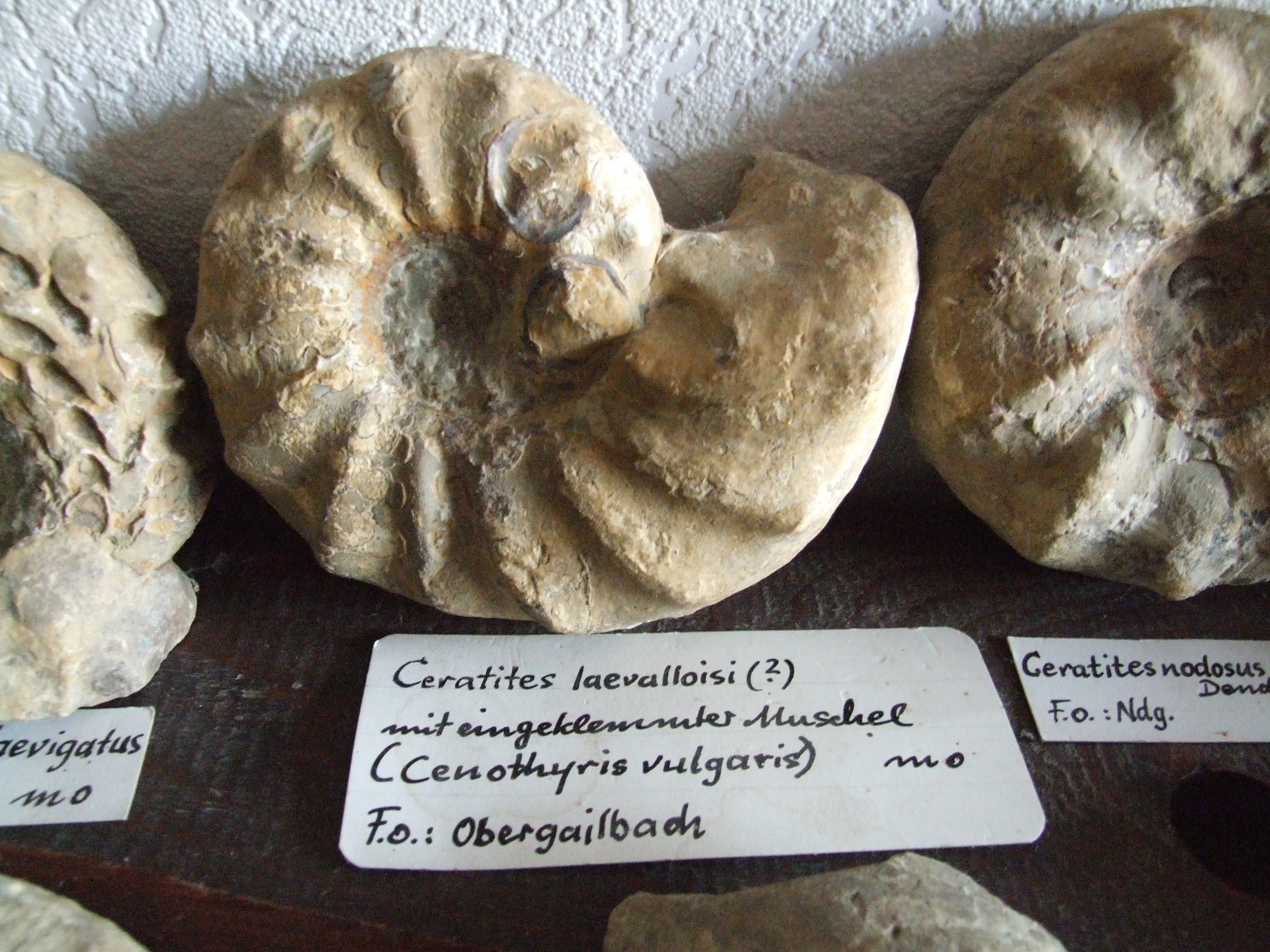
Fossil found in limestone of Obergailbach

The village belongs to the Pays de Bitche and to the Northern Vosges Regional Nature Park. Located on the border with Germany, it is adjacent to the German village of Niedergailbach.

== Population ==
Historical population
Year	Pop.	±% p.a.
1968	228	—
1975	217	−0.70%
1982	250	+2.04%
1990	264	+0.68%
1999	255	−0.38%
2007	306	+2.31%
2012	321	+0.96%
2017	304	−1.08%
2023	268	−2.08%
Source: INSEE

== See also ==
- Communes of the Moselle department
