= Conrad von Bolanden =

German prelate and novelist

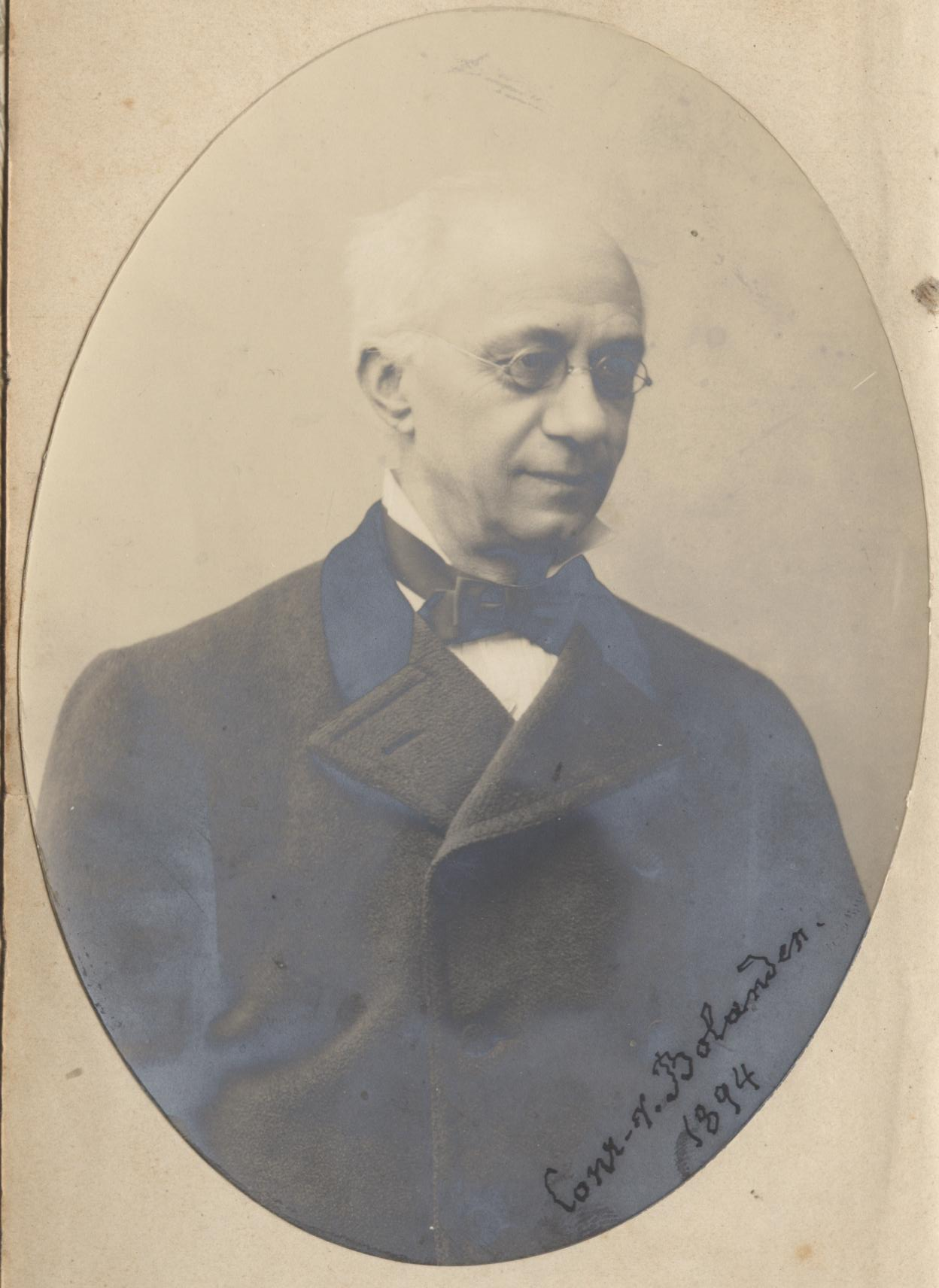
Conrad von Bolanden, private photo in civil dress (as a novelist he had a dispensation from wearing priestly garb) 1894, with his signature

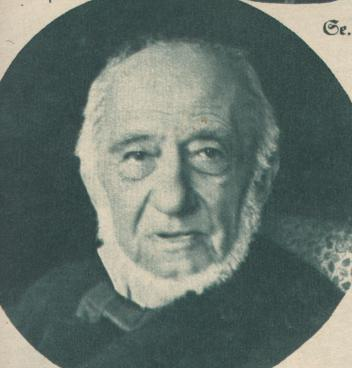
Conrad von Bolanden, one of his last photos, taken 1919, published in "Der Christliche Pilger", Diocesan Paper of Speyer, 1935

Conrad von Bolanden (9 August 1828 – 30 May 1920), born Joseph Eduard Konrad Bischoff, was a German prelate and novelist in the Roman Catholic Diocese of Speyer, who wrote A Wedding Trip, Queen Bertha and Historical Tales of Frederick II.

== Life ==
A German novelist, son of a rich merchant, born on 9 August 1828 in Niedergailbach, a village of the Palatinate, in that time a part of Bavaria. Now Niedergailbach belongs to the Saarland, although the main portion of the Palatinate region became a part of the neighbour-state Rhineland-Palatinate. Bolanden attended the Latin school at Blieskastel, the seminary in Speyer, and in 1849 entered the Ludwig-Maximilians-Universität München to study theology.

Ordained priest in Speyer in 1852, he was appointed assistant pastor at Speyer Cathedral. There he became the first priest of the diocese to receive a driver's license. Two years later he became pastor at Kirchheimbolanden. The following year he was transferred to Börrstadt and three years later to Berghausen. During this time he wrote his first four works. From the castle and village of Bolanden (between Kirchheim-Bolanden and Börrstadt) he chose his pen name "Conrad von Bolanden". In 1870, the priest resigned his parish to devote himself exclusively to literary work, and lived in strict retirement in Speyer.

Pope Pius IX granted Bolanden the title of a Papal Chamberlain. In his birth-village of Niedergailbach a street was named in his honour in 1993.

== Works ==
Bolanden published more than 60 books, mostly novels. These include:

- A Wedding Trip (about Martin Luther)
- Queen Bertha
- Historical Tales of Frederick II
- Gustav Adolf
- Canossa
- Franz von Sickingen
- Trowel or Cross
- Night of St. Bartholomew
- Savonarola
- Crusades
- Wambold
- Charlemagne
- Otto the Great
- Pillar of Truth

The 1913 Catholic Encyclopedia describes his novels, written in a simple style for a popular audience, as "not all of equal worth", but praises their conception, Bolanden's defense of Catholic positions, and his frequent quotations from original sources.

Bolanden's works were widely read and have been translated into English and other European languages. At one time his publications were prohibited in the Kingdom of Prussia.
