= Barbarossa city =

Nickname for five German cities

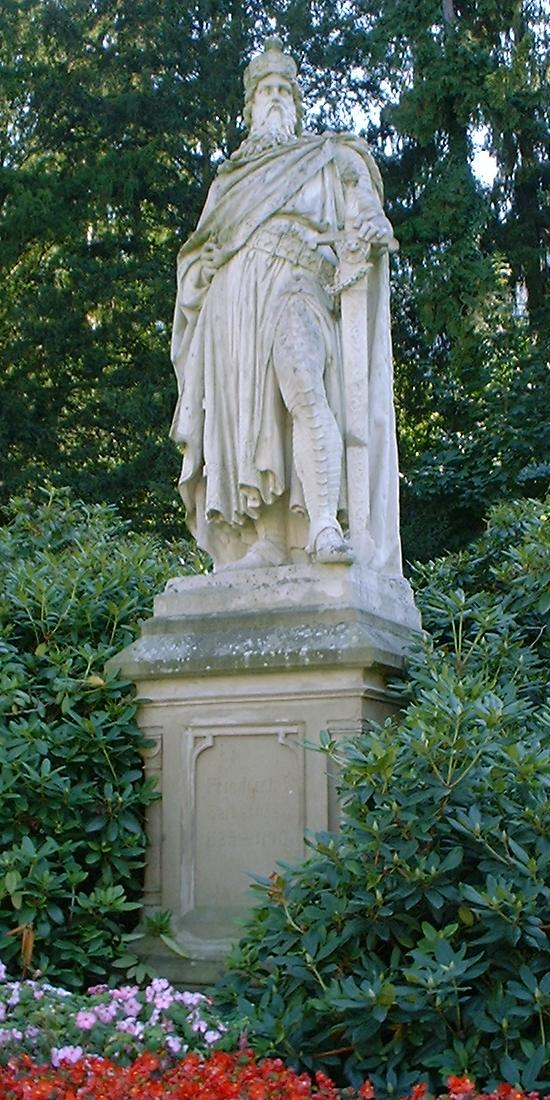
Memorial for Frederick Barbarossa in Sinzig

"Barbarossa city" (German: Barbarossastadt) is a nickname for German cities that the Staufer Emperor Frederick Barbarossa stayed in or near for some time. The cities usually mentioned include Sinzig, Kaiserslautern, Gelnhausen, Altenburg, Bad Frankenhausen, but Annweiler am Trifels, Bad Wimpfen, Eberbach and Waiblingen consider themselves as such as well.

== Sinzig ==
Sinzig is a city on the Middle Rhine in Ahrweiler County. Celtic in its early history and settled by the Romans, the city was first mentioned in 762 as a Franconian king's court, sentiacum. The city was at its height from the 12th through the 14th century as a Kaiserpfalz often visited by the German kings and emperors. Barbarossa himself stayed at Sinzig four times.

== Kaiserslautern ==
The settlement history of Kaiserslautern, an industrial city and university seat at the northern edge of the Palatinate Forest, begins in the 5th millennium BC. Around 1100 CE, Salian rulers built themselves a castle on the grounds of the present-day city hall. Between 1152 and 1158 Barbarossa had the castle expanded that would bear his name and serve as his Kaiserpfalz "with no insignificant amount of pomp". He designated Lautern the center of his Staufen empire, which marked the beginning of a boom for the community. The Kaiser's (imperial) palace was mentioned for the first time as "castrum domini imperatoris". In 1176 Barbarossa donated a hospital to the community and called Norbertines into Lautern to take on the hospital's management. The people of "Kaiser's Lautern" were proud to call their city a "Barbarossa city".

== Gelnhausen (Hesse) ==
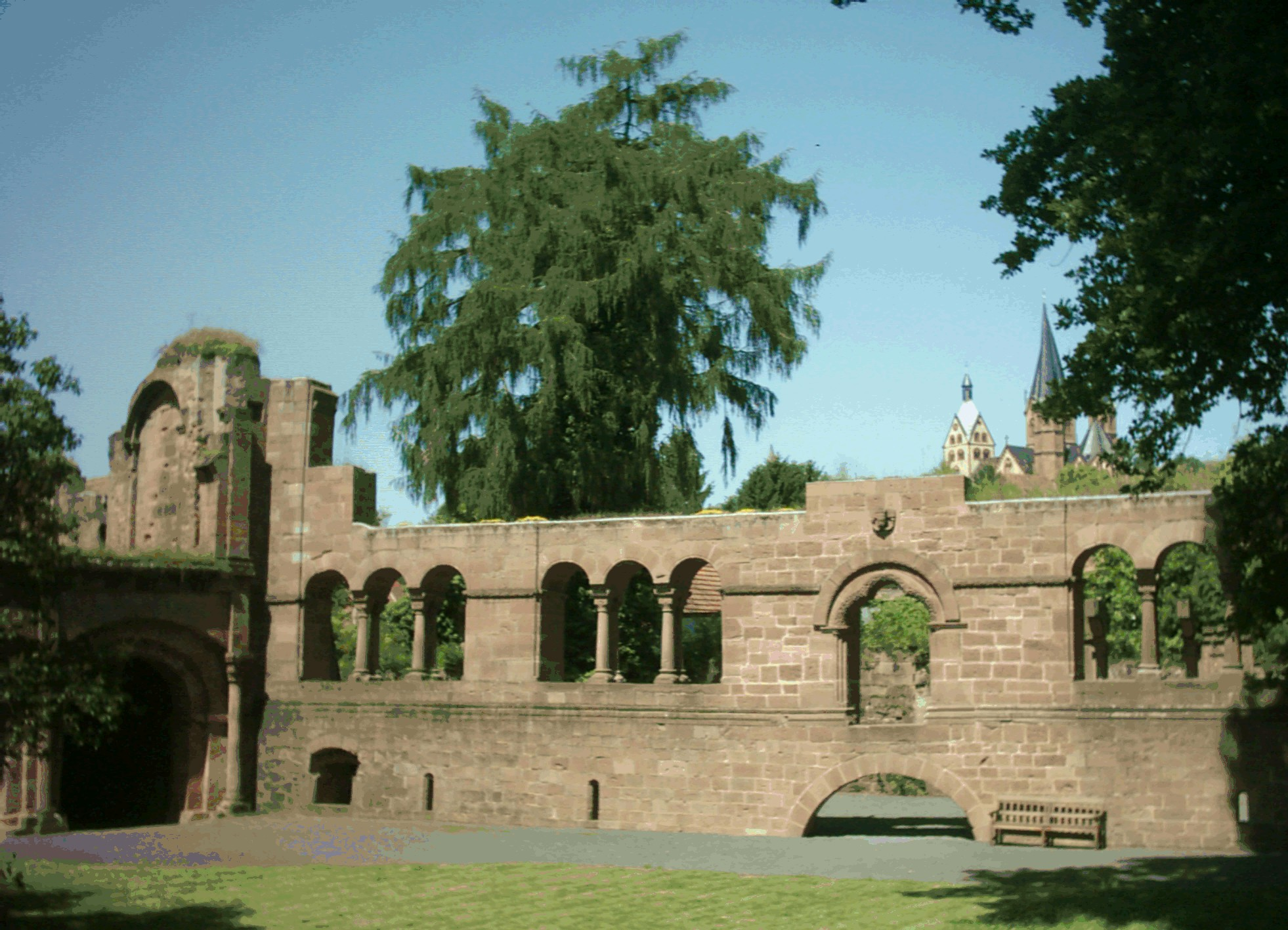
Imperial country castle at Gelnhausen 2005

The "Barbarossa city" of Gelnhausen is a city in Main-Kinzig County in the eastern part of Hesse. It was founded in 1170 by Barbarossa in this convenient location because the merchant highway Via Regia from Frankfurt to Leipzig intersected here with several other roads. Frederick I founded the city by combining three existing villages into the imperial free city of Gelnhausen. Imperial trading privileges such as duty-free zones lead to a rapid aggregation of traders and merchants. The fact that Gelnhausen was simultaneously awarded the Stapelrecht (Latin: Jus emporii), requiring passing merchants to offer their goods in town for a certain amount of time, also helped in making it a successful trading town. Only ten years after it was born the city hosted an important Reichstag where Henry the Lion was tried in absentia and all his lands were redistributed. The Kaiserpfalz in Gelnhausen is the best maintained Staufer country palace still in existence.

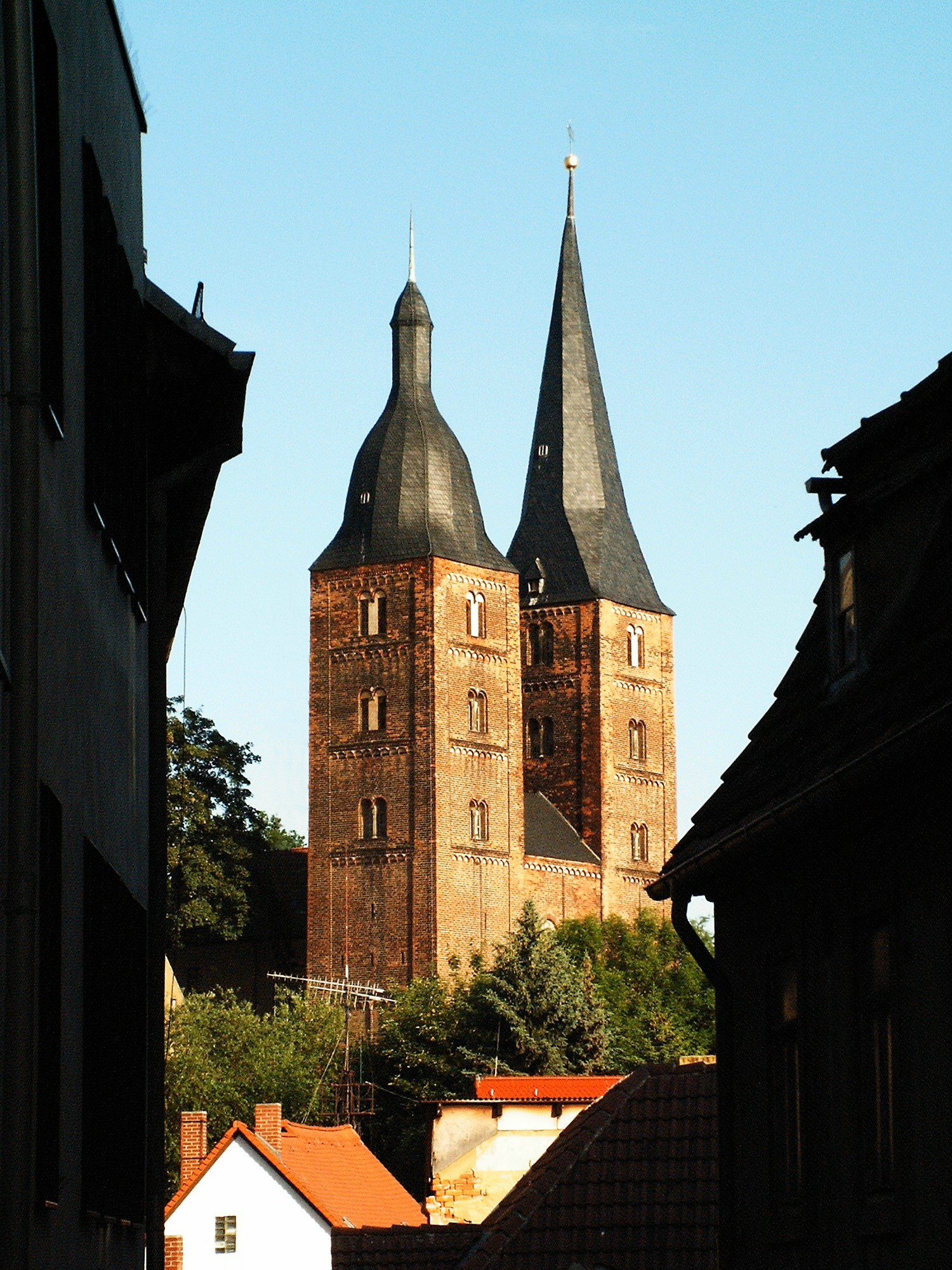
Rote Spitzen of Augustine monastery

== Altenburg (Thuringia) ==
Altenburg in the east of Thuringia may also rightfully call itself a "Barbarossa city". It was first mentioned in 976 by Emperor Otto II and Barbarossa stayed in the imperial castle Altenburg (Castrum Plysn), first mentioned in 1132, a total of six times between 1165 and 1188. In 1172 he consecrated the Augustinian monastery of "Our dear Lady St. Mary" at the top of the mountain.

== Bad Frankenhausen ==
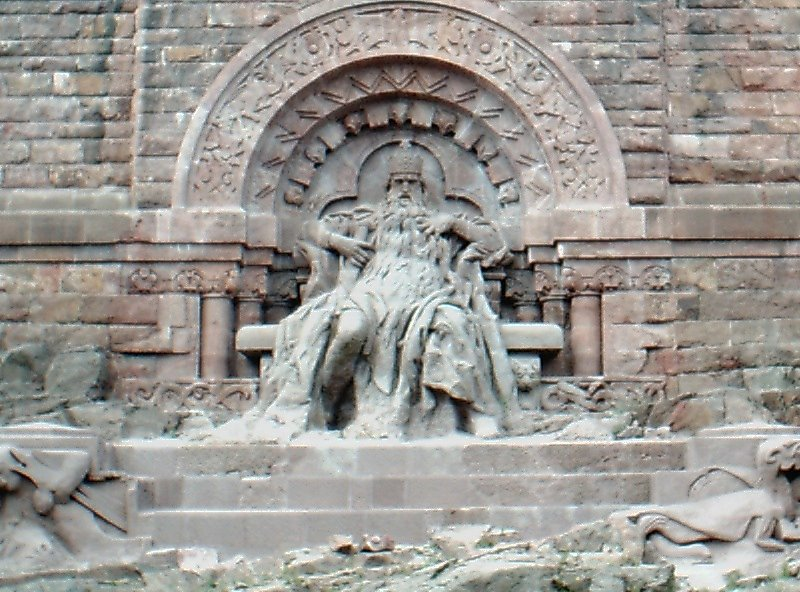
Kyffhäuser Monument with Frederick Barbarossa

Excavations evidence first settlements in Bad Frankenhausen at the southern edge of the Kyffhäuser area at approximately 8000 BC. The town itself was first mentioned in the 9th century in official documents of the abbey in Fulda where it was referred to as a Franconian settlement. Nearby is the "Barbarossa Cave" with its "emperor's throne" and the "Barbarossa Memorial" featuring a larger-than-life Frederick Barbarossa that was built on the ruins of the imperial castle of Kyffhausen (Reichsburg Kyffhausen) between 1890 and 1896. Because of these items, Frankenhausen is counted among the Barbarossa cities even though there is no evidence the Emperor ever stayed here.

== See also ==
- Frederick I, Holy Roman Emperor
- Cultural depictions of Frederick I, Holy Roman Emperor
