= Niedergailbach =

Coordinates: 49°08′02″N 7°12′26″E

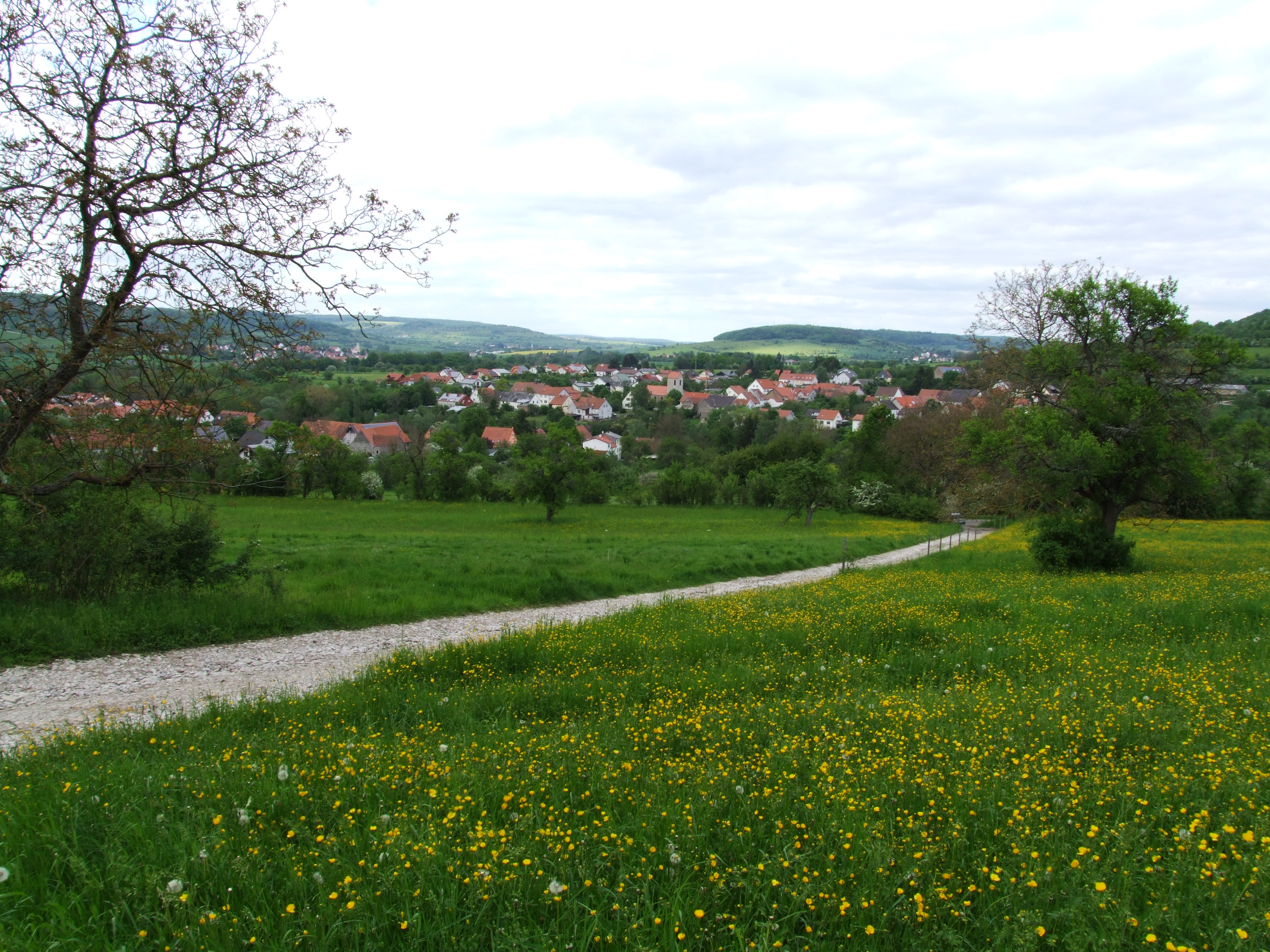
Niedergailbach

Niedergailbach is a small village in the German state of Saarland and belongs to the community of Gersheim in the Saarpfalz-Kreis. In 2000 it had 581 inhabitants. Located on the border with France, it is adjacent to the French village of Obergailbach.
