= Robert Toberentz =

German sculptor

Robert Toberentz (born 4 December 1849 in Berlin; d. 31 July 1895 in Rostock) was a German sculptor.

== Biography ==
He frequented the Prussian Academy of Arts in Berlin from 1867 to 1869. He then studied under Johannes Schilling in Dresden and from 1872 to 1875 in Rome. After his return to Berlin, he became a follower of Reinhold Begas, in whose manner he executed, among other works, the bronze figure of a "Shepherd Resting" (1878, Alte Nationalgalerie).

In 1879 he was appointed director of a master studio for sculptors connected with the Breslau Museum (German: Schlesisches Museum für bildende Künste), resigned in 1884, and after living in America in 1885–89, returned to Berlin in 1890 and became professor in 1895. He completed the "Luther Monument" of Paul Otto, in Berlin, modeled the equestrian statue of Frederick Barbarossa for the Kaiserhaus at Goslar, and made the statue of Frederick the Great for the Royal Palace in Berlin. He also fashioned several masterly life-size nude figures, such as an "Ancient Greek Maiden Sculptor" and "Girl Asleep on a Couch.”
