= Cultural depictions of Charles IV, Holy Roman Emperor =

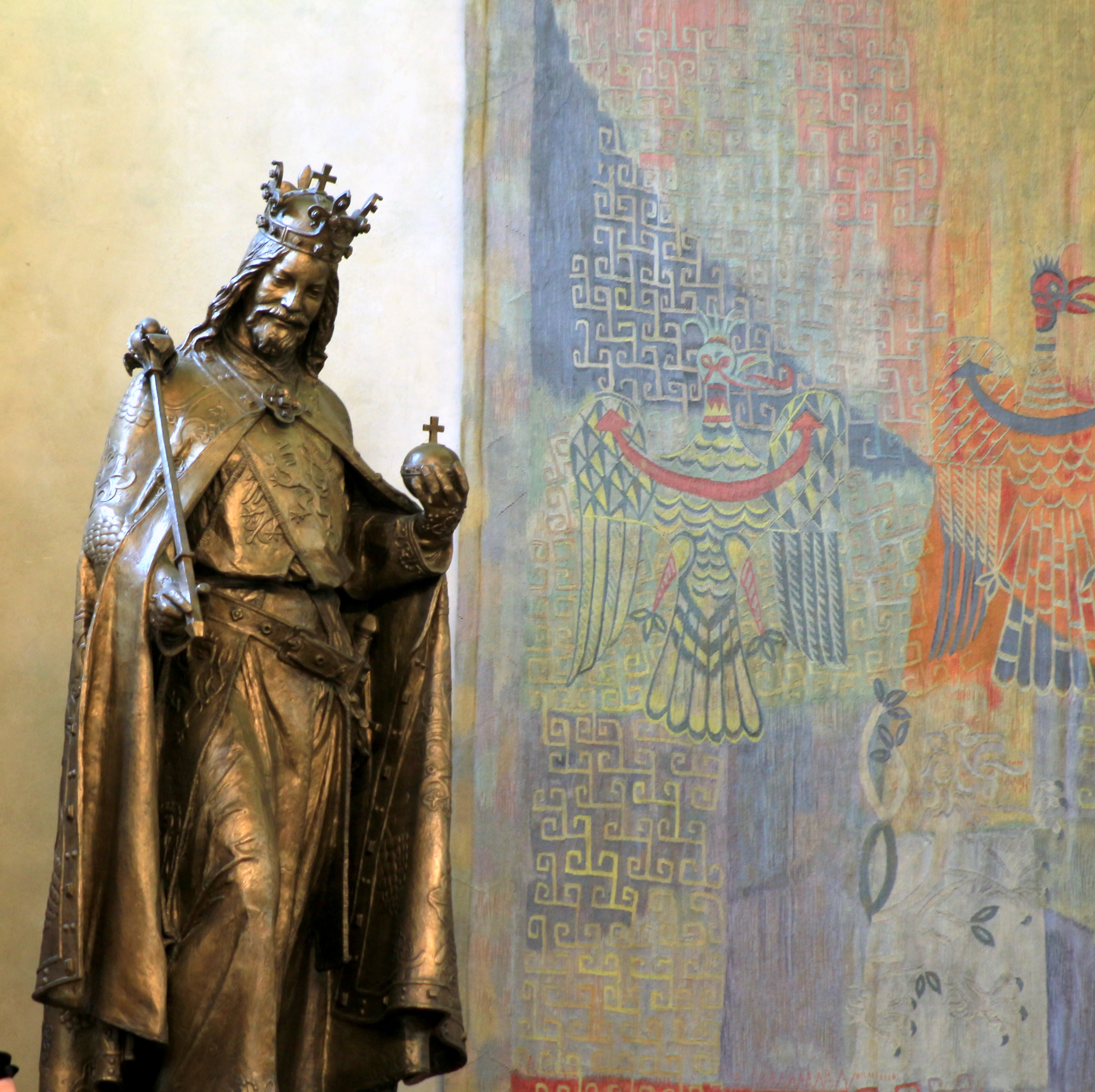
Charles IV's statue in Karolinum

Charles IV, Holy Roman Emperor, from the House of Luxembourg was King of Bohemia (1346–1378) and Holy Roman Emperor (1355–1378). A powerful and intellectual ruler, Charles has been remembered for his munificient patronage, especially in the Kingdom of Bohemia which reached the apex of political and cultural power under his reign. In the Holy Roman Empire, his Golden Bull of 1356 marked a point of change concerning the political structure of the Empire – some historians opine that this gave recognition to the victory of the particularism of the princes, while others think of the document as an achievement that maintained balance of power in the Empire and brought a measure of peace. Recently, some darker aspects of his rule like religious persecution have also attracted attention.

== Historiography ==
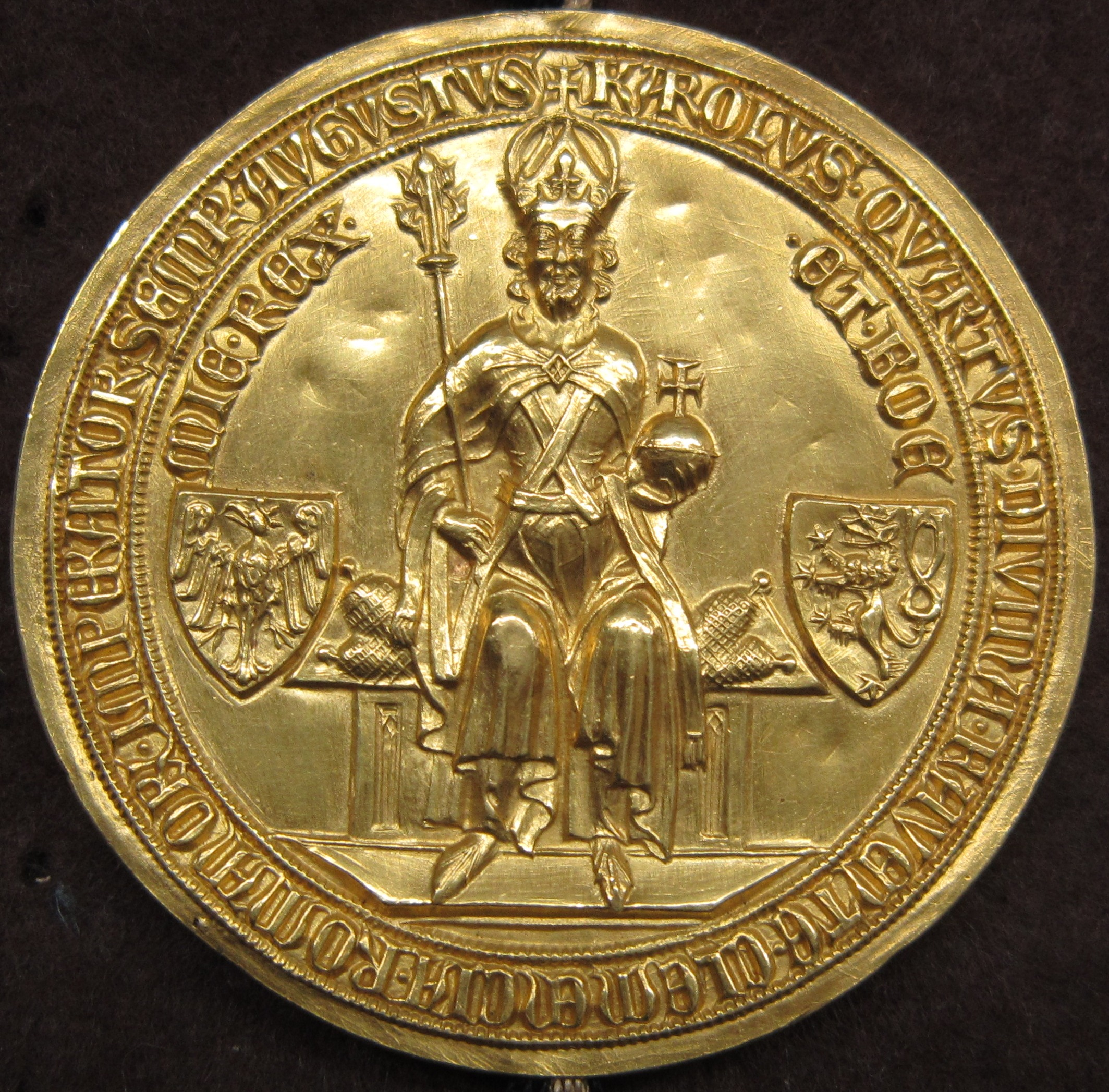
The seal of the Golden Bull of 1356.

Charles IV's era has been remembered as the Golden Age of the Czech nation and he has been praised for bringing great cultural prosperity to Bohemia – Prague became the center of the Holy Roman Empire and the "cultural capital of Eastern-Central Europe". He is widely considered to be the greatest Czech ruler (in a 2005 television competition, he also received the most votes as the greatest Czech overall).

Charles's reputation as Holy Roman Emperor and German king is more controversial. In his lifetime, his opponents criticized his alliance with the papacy and dubbed him "the pope's king". Maximilian I called him "arch-stepfather of the Empire" (playing on the epithet "Father of the Fatherland" given to Charles at his funeral). Nevertheless, nineteenth century German historians in general neither glorified nor denigrated Charles's legacy, while the Czechs were careful not to let their hero be appropriated by the Germans. In modern time, for some researchers like Peter Moraw, Charles was "the greatest ruler of the German Late Middle Age" and "probably also the foremost among the great European kings of the late European century". In The Story of Civilization, Will Durant opines that Charles governed well as emperor and king, and praised him for improving administration and commerce as well as providing relative peace. In 1978, Ferdinand Seibt wrote a sympathetic biography that affirms Charles's image as a clever diplomat, a restless worker and a prince of peace (that he had strived to build for himself during his lifetime – Eva Schlotheuber notes that he chose this image because he lacked "knightly talents").

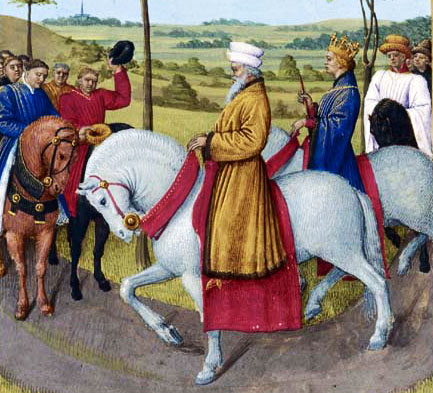
Charles IV and the dignitaries of Paris. Illustration from Grandes Chroniques de France, BnF, Ms fr. 6465, fol. 442v

The Golden Bull issued in 1356 by Charles IV is the subject of debates: on one hand, it helped to restore peace in the lands of the Empire, that had been engulfed in civil conflicts after the end of the Hohenstaufen era; on the other hand, the "blow to central authority was unmistakable". Thomas Brady Jr. opines that Charles IV's intention was to end contested royal elections (from the Luxembourghs' perspective, they also had the advantage that the King of Bohemia had a permanent and preeminent status as one of the Electors himself). Peter H.Wilson opines that the document was a compromise between emperor and princes, which helped stabilizing national politics and extending the Empire's existence, as part of the trend towards consensus politics. It also signified a break with Rome by linking the imperial dignity to the act of election in Germany rather than the coronation in Rome. Michael Lindner and Paul-Joachim Heinig opine that the Golden Bull depended on a set of contemporary political conditions and only gained it long-term structure-defining importance over the course of time. While Heinig sees the document as a complex compromise rather than representation of the formation of the Electoral College or imperial innovation, Lindner sees it as Charles's declaration of sovereignty against the Papacy.

The political philosophers Voegelin and Moulakis write about Charles IV as the following:

The changes in the German political structure found their recognition and formalization in the Golden Bull of 1356, in the reign of Charles IV (1347–1378). On the negotiations that determined the content of the instrument we have little information. After a period of suggestions and guesses as to who might have been the "author" of the document, the prevalent opinion today seems to be that the emperor himself took the initiative for the legislation, that the document was elaborated by the chancellery on the basis of negotiations between the emperor and the electors, and that it reflects on the whole the emperor's own policy. The personality of the man, however, who determined the German constitutional form for the next four and a half centuries is not yet seen quite clearly [...] The qualities that made him one of the most successful statesmen on the imperial throne were unpopular qualities – unpopular in his own time, and unpopular also with later historians. He was a devout Christian [...] the figures of his two patrons, Charlemagne and Saint Wenceslas, were of equal influence in determining his conception of rulership as a Roman emperor and a king of Bohemia. His sensitiveness to history and tradition, however, was not romantic; he was a master of rational politics, averse to violent solutions when diplomacy could achieve results. He was a careful administrator and house-holder, and he was probably the only prince of his time who never lacked money. His financial resources he used circumspectly for political purposes and with a thoroughness that can be explained only by a profound contempt of human nature and by the experience that almost every man has his price. The curious mixture of devotional Christianity and rational statecraft, the assertion of imperial claims – he was the last emperor to be crowned as king of Burgundy – on the one hand and the construction of the empire as an oligarchy of the princes on the other, his position over or between the nations—these complexities are probably why one of the great Western statesmen has remained to this day in a relative historical obscurity.

Reviewing Pierre Monnet's recent work Karl IV. Der europäische Kaiser, Wihoda disagrees with Monnet's assertion that Wenceslaus (Wenzel) IV failed to understand his father's style of ruling. Wihoda opines that based on Monnet's portrayal alone, Charles's much praised diplomacy skills did not appear that impressive and that Wenceslaus had to bear the price of debt and isolation. In that context, Wenceslaus had to abandon Charles's old advisors (who were of high noble origins) and replace them with economic experts who were needed to fix the shattered economy. In recent times, the traditional dichotomy between Charles (as the good king) and Wenceslaus (as the bad king, the good-for-nothing son who destroyed his father's inheritance) has been reviewed. While a completely reversed verdict is not formed, Wenceslaus is now seen in a more sympathetic light and some of his difficulties are traced back to problems arising from Charles's reign. Brady Jr. remarks that Charles's court's inability to deal with the great number of German-speaking immigrants in Bohemia (and the religious tensions this situation brought about) weakened public stability and decreased the chance for the Luxembourg imperial project's success. According to Brady, there was a contrast between the glittering, cultured court and the "reign of terrors" some commoners – mostly German immigrants alleged to be Waldensians – suffered.

== Anecdotes ==
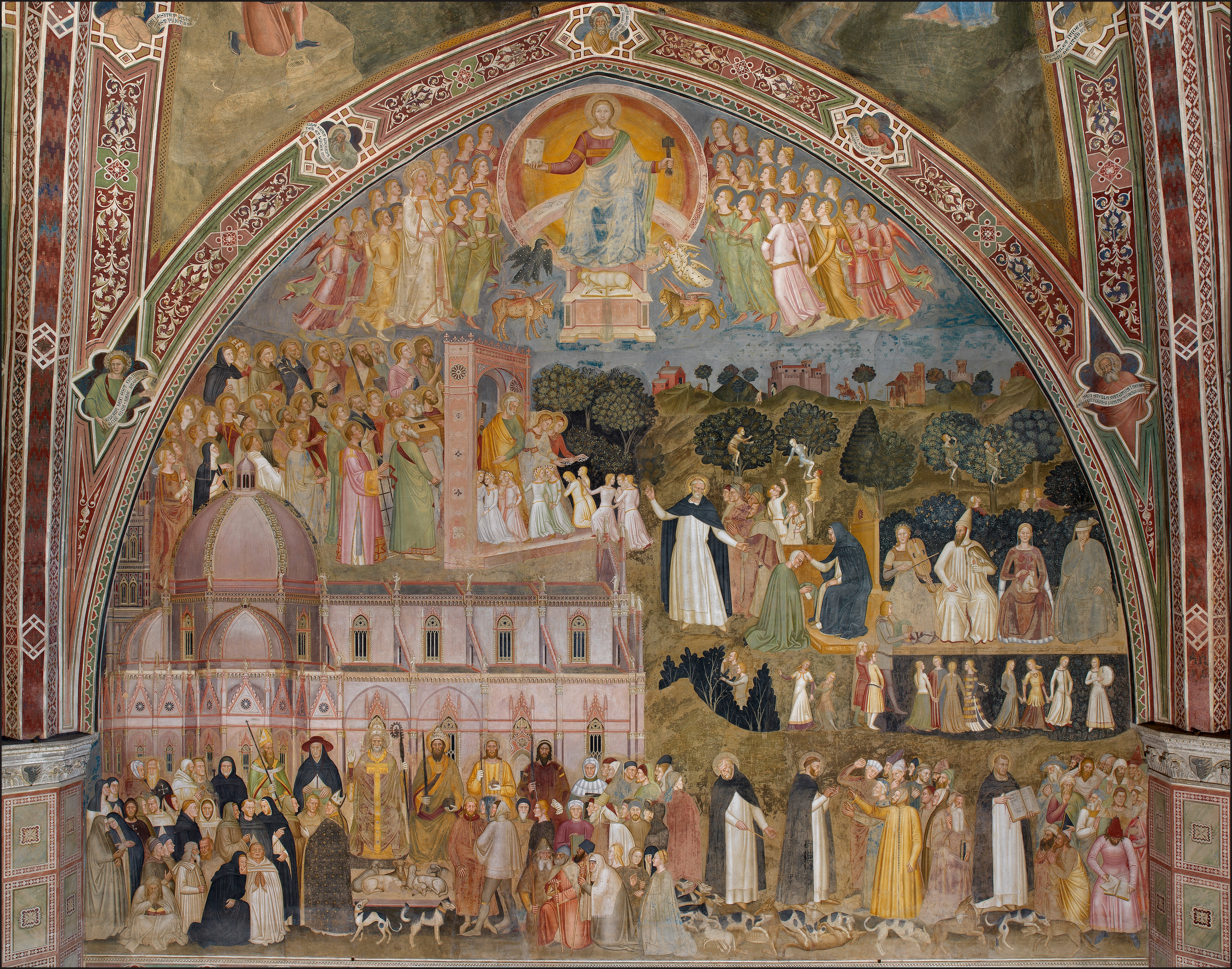
Andrea di Bonaiuto. Santa Maria Novella. Charles IV is enthroned and sits next to the Pope (Urban V or Innocent VI) in the left foreground. Fresco (1366).

There are anecdotes that reflect Charles's graceful personality.

- The emperor was once informed that a certain man had been seduced by his enemy with a large sum of money. Charles wrote to the man as the following: "I am sorry it has not been in your power to portion your daughter, who is now marriageable. Accept these 1,000 ducats for that purpose.” The man felt ashamed and chose to retire, full of gratitude toward the emperor.
- A Bohemian citizen lent the emperor 100,000 ducats, and received from Charles IV a bond. The next day, this citizen invited the emperor and many from the imperial court to a banquet. When they brought the dessert to the table, the host ordered the bond to be placed inside a golden cup, which was presented to Charles, and gave this speech: "The other part of this repast, Sire, you share equally with the rest of my guests. This cup belongs to you only, and I must beg you to accept it as present."

== Depictions in arts ==
=== Arts under Charles IV's reign ===
==== Writings by Charles IV ====
Charles IV was a writer himself.

- Charles's autobiography is the Vita Caroli. According to Geary, "His autobiography, which describes the life of the pan-European aristocracy during his time, is one of the first true autobiographies of a layperson in the West." The work corresponds to the first thirty years of his life and also provides insights about Charles's concept of an ideal ruler.
- His Legend of Saint Wenceslaus is also an important work that displays the author's devotion to the "national saint" (Charles's original name was also Wenceslaus).
- His Moralitates (Moralities) is a collection of theological and moral reflections, especially on the virtues of a king.

==== Architecture ====
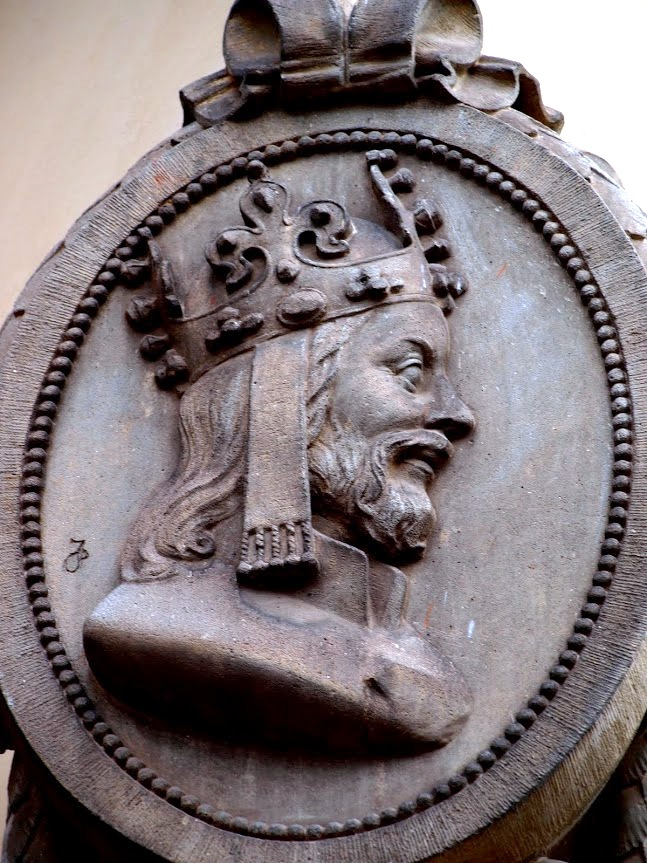
Charles's portrait in Karlštejn

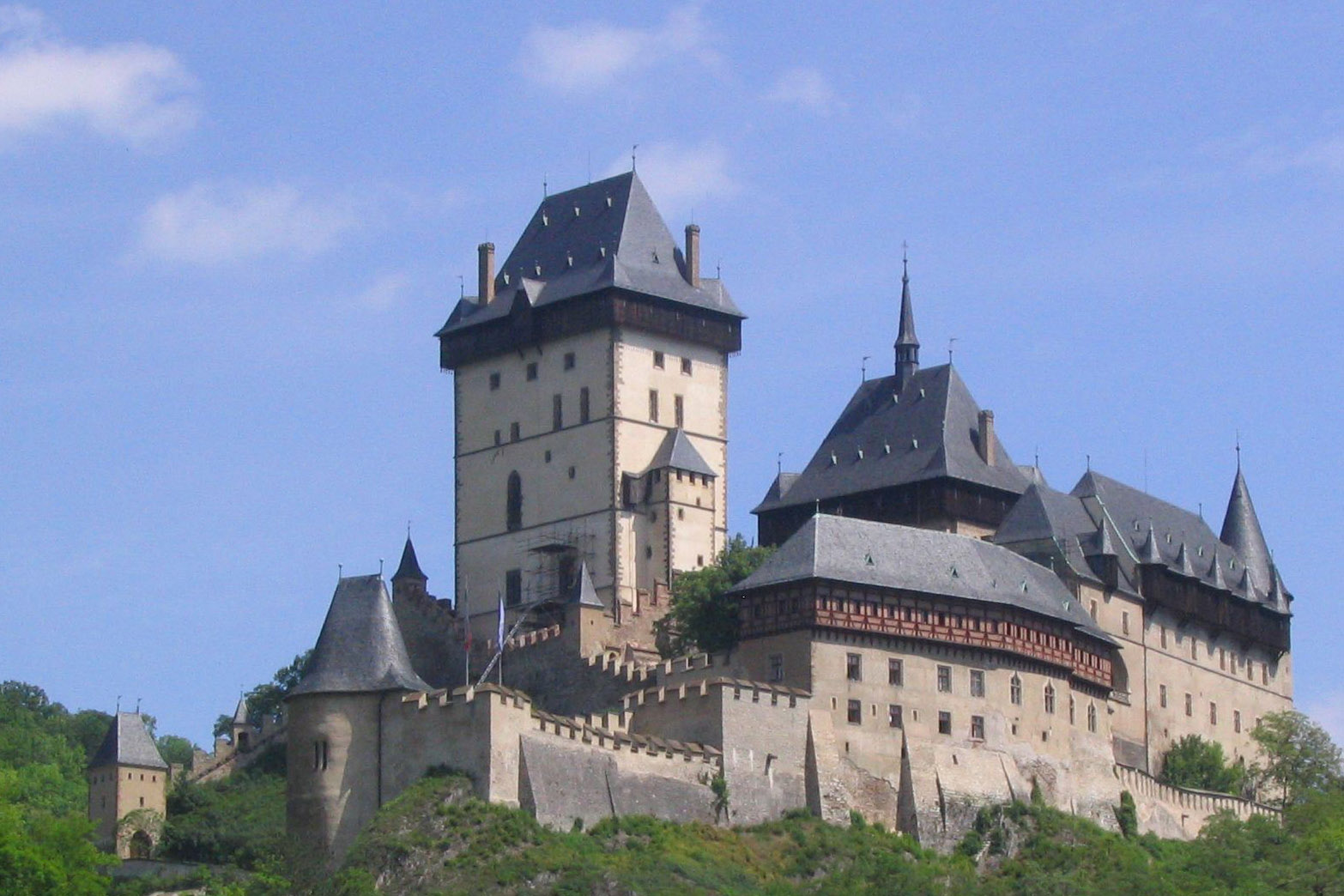
The Castle of Karlstein

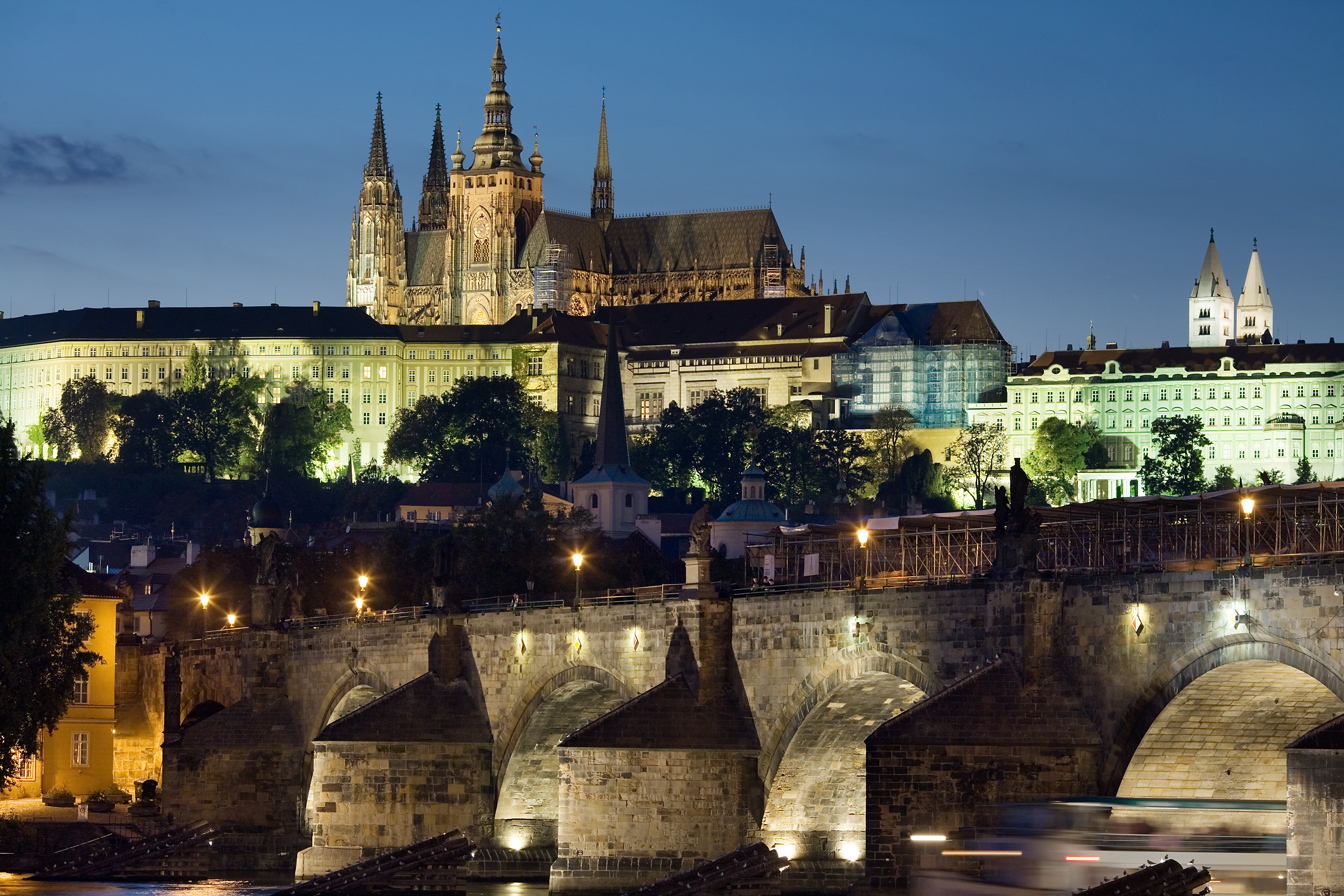
Charles Bridge at night

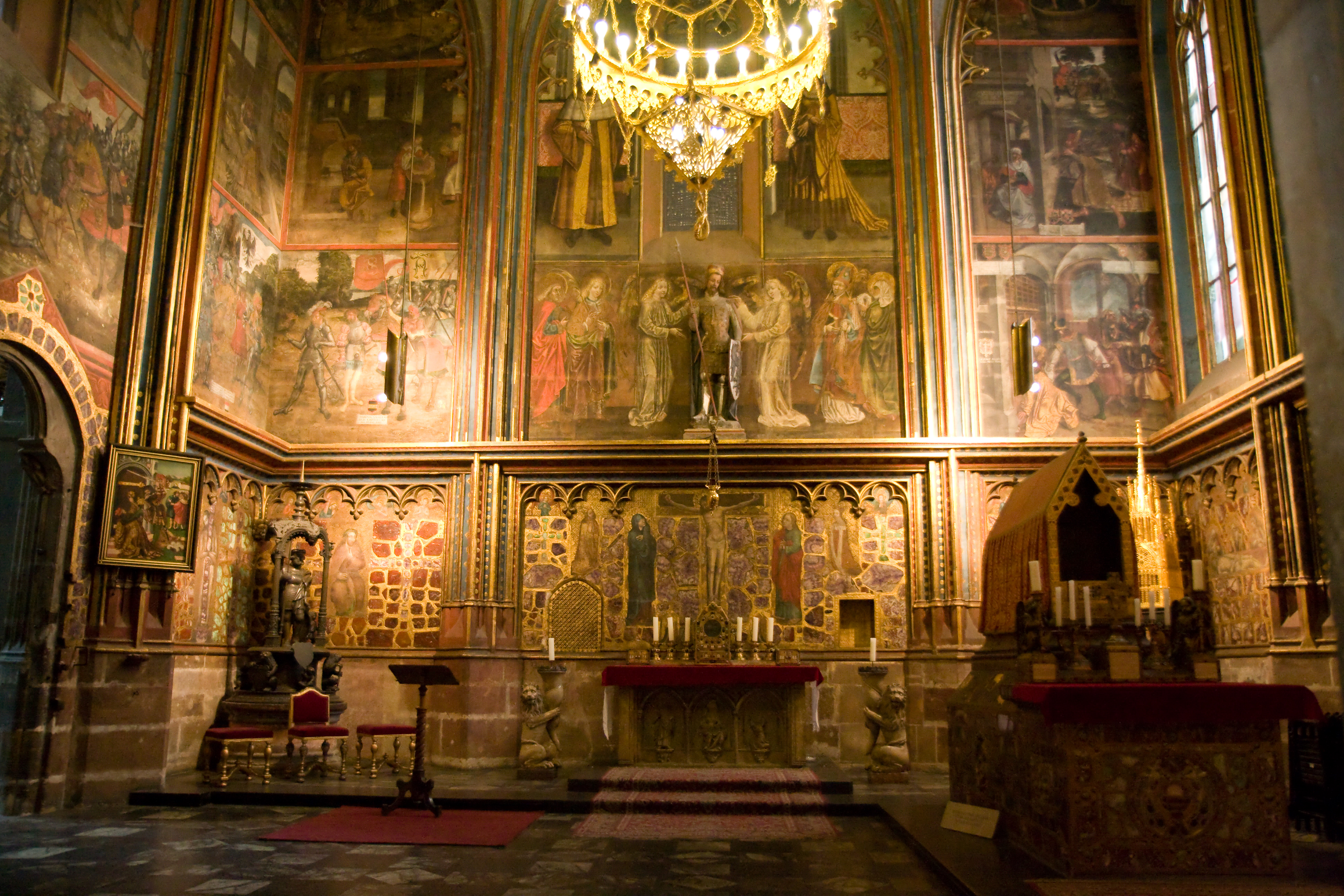
St.Wenceslaus Chapel in the St. Vitus Cathedral

Charles was a generous patron of architecture. The most important buildings he built include the Castle of Karlstein, St. Vitus Cathedral and the Charles Bridge.

- The Castle of Karlstein houses the imperial treasury and his collection of relics, providing an abundant of images of the emperor himself. There are three representations of Charles in a famois frescoed triptych, and many donation-scenes. Another key image, emphasizing dynastic continuity as well, appears on the so-called Coronation route of the Bohemian kings, on the gate tower of Charles Bridge. Charles also appears kneeling as a patron in several important images, among them the mosaic above the south (main) portal of St. Vitus.
- The current Gothic building of the St.Vitus Cathedral was built by Matthias of Arras and Peter Parler under the patronage of Charles. The likeness of Charles in the St. Wenceslaus Chapel "focus on Charles mainly as a ruler of the Czech lands, emphasizing his continuity with the sainted king of the Czechs, St. Wenceslas." Crossley remarks that the St.Wenceslaus Chapel is the ideological nucleus of the structure and is so foreign to Parler's usual oeuvre that it can only be attributed to Charles's functional and ideological interests.
- The Charles Bridge displays the emperor's power, combining the shields of the Holy Roman Empire (with the eagle) and Bohemia (with the lion).

=== Later depictions ===
==== Visual arts ====
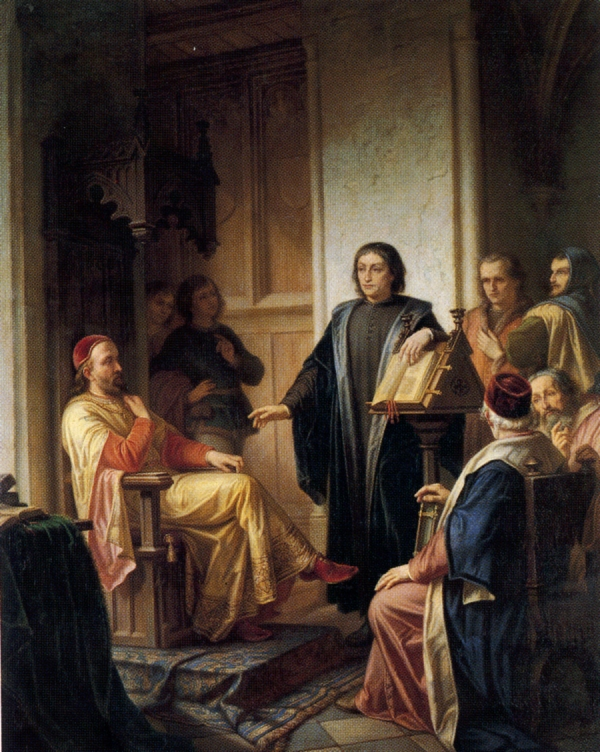
František Čermák - Karel IV. se svými rádci (1874 )

- Charles's portrait by Johann Franz Brentano (1840), is part of a series depicting emperors who reigned from 768 to 1806 (created from 1839 to 1853) in the Kaisersaal in Frankfurt am Main.
- In 1855, Josef Matyáš Trenkwald depicted the establishment of the Prague University (now the Charles University) by Charles.
- In 1858, the Prague sculptor Josef Max built the Column of Charles IV in Karlovy Vary.
- In 1874, František Čermák painted the Charles IV and his advisors, depicting the king as a wise, ideal king.
- Between 1896 and 1897, The sculptor Friedrich Hausmann built the statue of Charles IV at the Römer in Frankfurt. Hausmann also produced the statue of Maximilian II for the Römer.
- Between 1897 and 1900, Ludwig Cauer created the bronze statue of Charles IV at the Tangermünde Burg.
- In 1955, Karlovy Vary installed the statue of Charles IV created by Otakar Švec in Sady Karla IV. (Charles IV Park).

==== Theater ====
- The emperor in Goethe's Faust is model after Charles IV: the emperor, who has to struggle with a rival emperor and then distribute his powers to vassals, is portrayed with a "combination of luxurious ostentation and poverty" (and essential powerlessness). Goethe based his portrayal on Edward Gibbon's depiction, that recounts a story about Charles IV being detained by a butcher of Worms for failing to pay his expenses.
- Jaroslav Vrchlický's 1884 Noc na Karlštejně (A night at Karlstein), "a lyrical comedic romance", is about Charles IV and his court.

==== TV series ====
- The emperor was dramatized in season 2, episode 4 of the ZDF documentary Die Deutschen, titled Karl IV. und der Schwarze Tod (Charles IV and the Black Death, 2010).

== Commemoration ==
Charles IV is commemorated widely in the modern Czech Republic. In 2016, in commemoration of the 700th year of his birth, various exhibitions and events about the ruler's life were organized in Czech and Germany.

== See also ==
- Cultural depictions of Sigismund, Holy Roman Emperor
- Cultural depictions of Barbara of Cilli
- Cultural depictions of Otto the Great
- Cultural depictions of Otto III, Holy Roman Emperor
- Cultural depictions of Conrad II, Holy Roman Emperor
- Cultural depictions of Frederick I, Holy Roman Emperor
- Cultural depictions of Frederick II, Holy Roman Emperor
- Cultural depictions of Maximilian I, Holy Roman Emperor
- Cultural depictions of Charles V, Holy Roman Emperor

== Bibliography and further reading ==
- Rosario, Iva (2000). Art and Propaganda: Charles IV of Bohemia, 1346-1378. Boydell Press. ISBN 978-0-85115-787-0.
- Fajt, Jiří; Hörsch, Markus (2016). Kaiser Karl IV., 1316-2016: erste Bayerisch-Tschechische Landesausstellung : Ausstellungskatalog (in German). Národní galerie v Praze. ISBN 978-80-7035-613-5.
- Nagy, Balázs (2 October 2001). Autobiography of Emperor Charles IV and his Legend of St Wenceslas. Central European University Press. p. 177. ISBN 978-963-386-556-9.
- Seibt, Ferdinand (1978). Karl IV. [i.e. der Vierte]: ein Kaiser in Europa, 1346-1378 (in German). Süddeutscher Verlag. ISBN 978-3-7991-6015-5.
- Moraw, Peter (1979). Kaiser Karl IV. im deutschen Spätmittelalter (in German). Oldenbourg.
- Vlček, Emanuel; Royt, Jan (1 September 2016). Physical and personality traits of Charles IV, Holy Roman Emperor and King of Bohemia: A medical-anthropological investigation. Charles University in Prague, Karolinum Press. ISBN 978-80-246-3377-0.
- Brady, Thomas A. Jr. (13 July 2009). German Histories in the Age of Reformations, 1400-1650. Cambridge University Press. ISBN 978-0-521-88909-4.
- Karl IV. Kaiser von Gottes Gnaden : Kunst und Repräsentation des Hauses Luxemburg 1310-1437; [zur Ausstellung "Karl IV. - Kaiser von Gottes Gnaden. Kunst und Repräsentation unter den Luxemburgern 1347-1437" ... 16. Februar - 21. Mai 2006, Bildergalerie der Prager Burg; The Metropolitan Museum of Art, New York, 19. September 2005-3. Januar 2006. München: Dt. Kunstverl. 2006. ISBN 978-3-422-06598-7.
- Monnet, Pierre (2021). Karl IV. Der europäische Kaiser. Darmstadt. ISBN 978-3-8062-4271-3.
