= Cultural depictions of Frederick II, Holy Roman Emperor =

Cultural depictions of Holy Roman Emperors

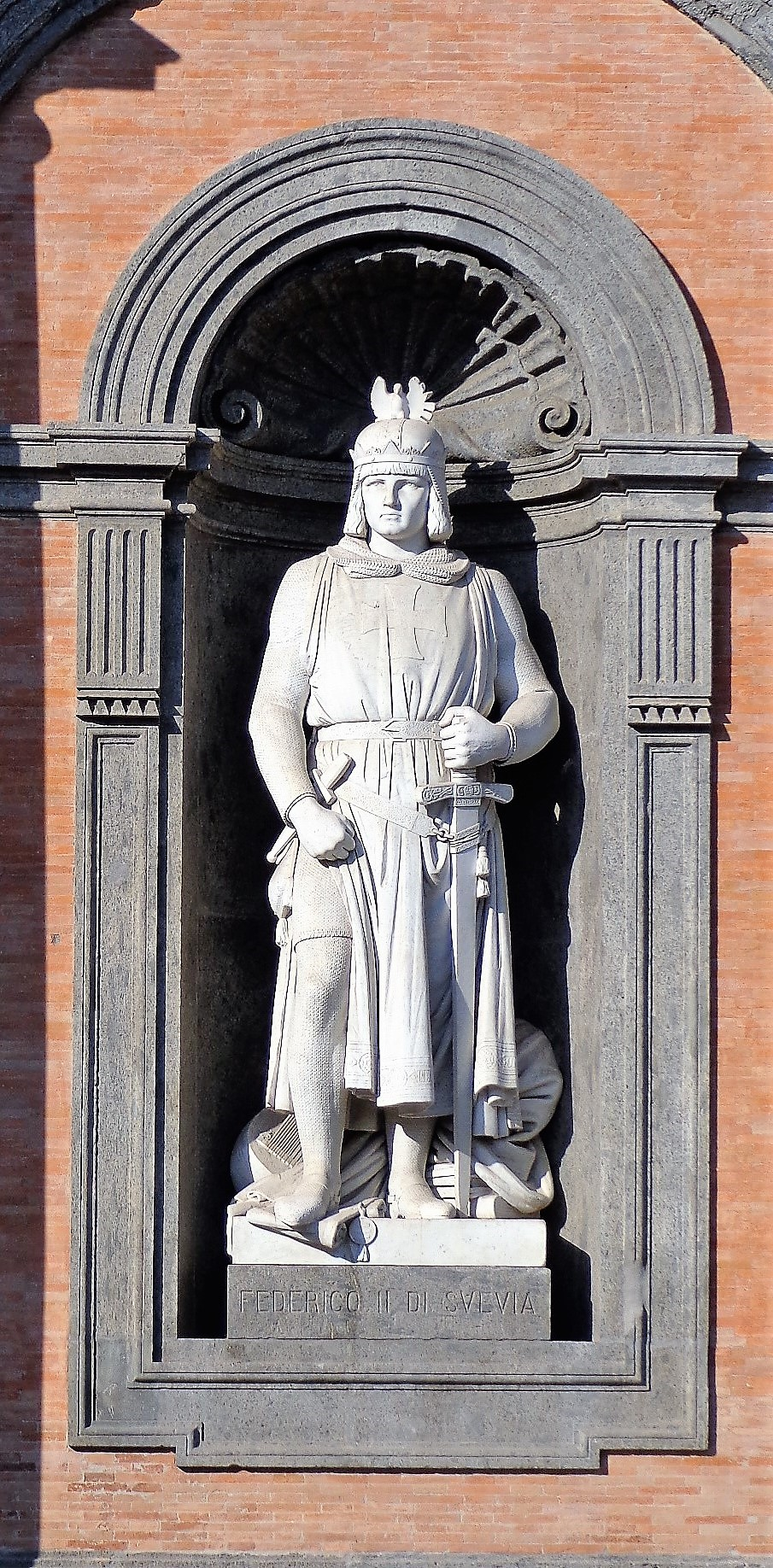
Frederick II's statue in Palazzo Reale di Napoli. The sculptor was Emanuele Caggiano (1888).

Frederick II, Holy Roman Emperor, also called Stupor mundi (Wonder of the World), was a notable European ruler who left a controversial political and cultural legacy. Considered by some to be "the most brilliant of medieval German monarchs, and probably of all medieval rulers", and admired for his multifaceted activities in the fields of government building, legislative work, cultural patronage and science, he has also been criticized for his cruelty and despotism.

In Italy, the emperor gained a split image, with one element being favoured over the other depending on the era and the region: tyrant, heretic, enlightened despot, Puer Apulia (Boy from Apulia), and father of the Fatherland. Modern scholars generally praise the emperor's many talents, but the degree Frederick's actions and attitude can be considered to be a break from contemporary norms, as well as his contribution to contemporary advancement of knowledge (in the context of Sicilian and Hohenstaufen legacies, as well as cultural developments by other courts) is often subject to debates.

== Historiography ==
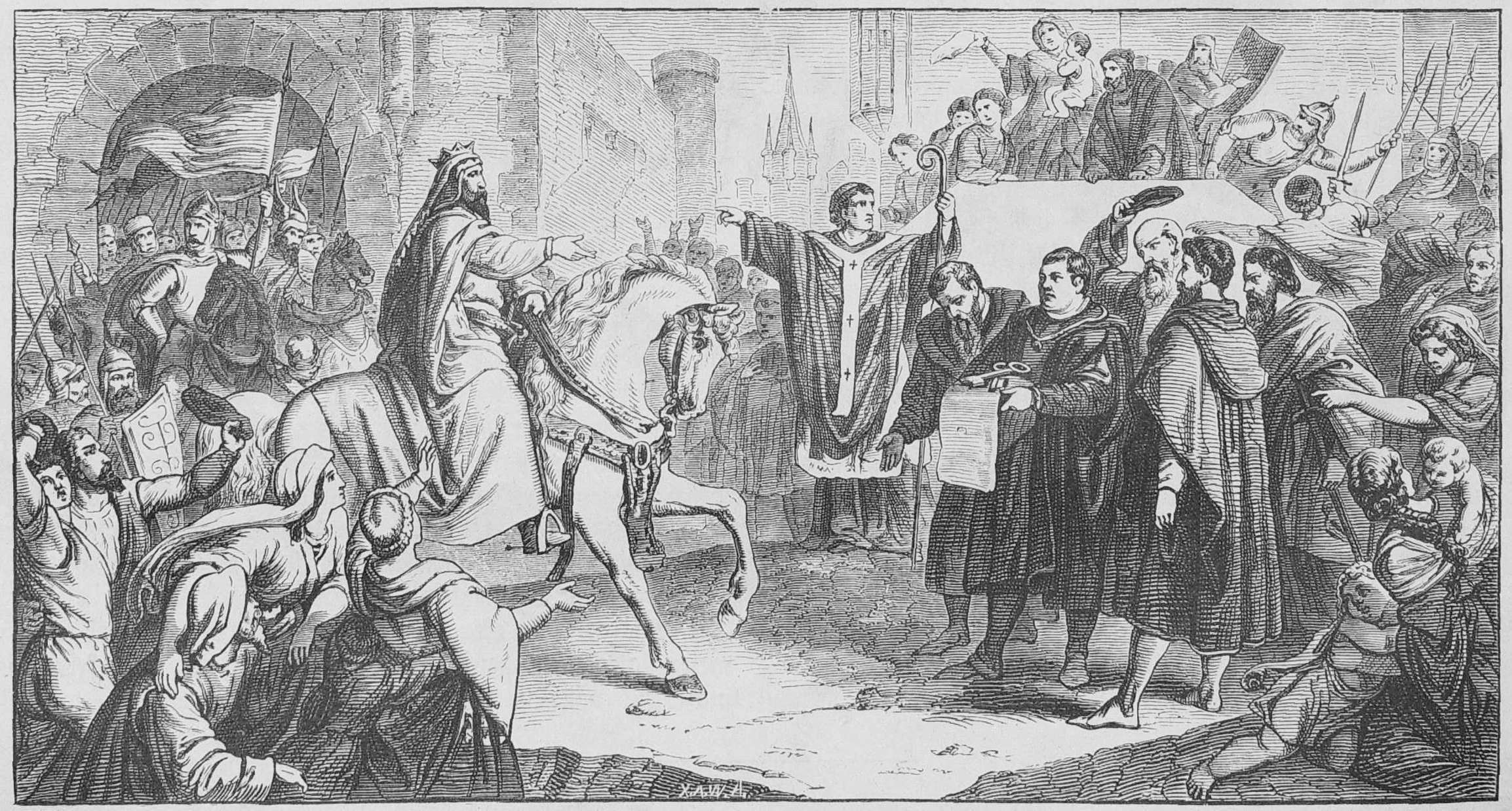
Frederick the Second enters Constance as Emperor, from Die Gartenlaube (1866)

=== German and English accounts ===
Ernst Kantorowicz's biography, Frederick the Second, original published in 1927, is a very influential work in the historiography of the emperor. Kantorowicz praises Frederick as a genius, who created the "first western bureaucracy", an "intellectual order within the state" that acted like "an effective weapon in his fight with the Church—bound together from its birth by sacred ties in the priestly-Christian spirit of the age, and uplifted to the triumphant cult of the Deity Justitia." Kantorowicz's writings about Frederick were abused during the Nazi period for propaganda purpose. Joseph Mali and Yôsef Malî argue that Frederick II were not important for the Nazis the way Frederick Barbarossa or Karl the Great, as exemplars of pure Aryanness, were though. They also note that while Kantorowicz endorsed Burckhardt's thinking, that Frederick was the prototypical modern ruler, whose Gewaltstaat later became the model of tyrannies for all Renaissance princes, Kantorowicz primarily saw Frederick as the last and greatest Christian emperor, who embraced "Medieval World Unity".

For the famous 19th century English historian Edward Augustus Freeman, in genius and accomplishments, Frederick II was “surely the greatest prince who ever wore a crown”, superior to Alexander, Constantine or Charlemagne, who failed to grasp nothing in the “compass of the political or intellectual world of his age”. Freeman even considered Frederick to have been the last true Emperor of the West. Lionel Allshorn wrote in his 1912 biography of the Emperor that Frederick surpassed all of his contemporaries and introduced “the only enlightened concept of the art of government” in the Middle Ages. Dr. M. Schipa, in the Cambridge Medieval History, considered Frederick II a “creative spirit” who had “no equal” in the centuries between Charlemagne and Napoleon, forging in Sicily and Italy “the state as a work of art” and laid the “fertile seeds of a new era.” The noted Austrian cultural historian Egon Friedell saw Frederick as the greatest of the ‘four great rulers’ in history, embodying the far-seeing statecraft of Julius Caesar, the intellectuality of Frederick the Great, and the enterprise and “artist’s gaminerie” of Alexander the Great. For Friedell, Frederick’s “free mind” and “universal comprehension” of everything human stemmed from the conviction that no one was right. W. Köhler wrote that Frederick’s “marked individuality” made him the “ablest and most mature mind” of the Hohenstaufen who towered above his contemporaries. For Frederick, knowledge was power, and because of his knowledge, he wielded despotic power. Though the “sinister facts” of his despotism should not be ignored, the greatness of his mind and his energetic will compels admiration.

Thomas Curtis Van Cleve's 1972 The Emperor Frederick II of Hohenstaufen, Immutator Mundi also acknowledges the emperor's genius, as a ruler, lawgiver and also as a scientist. Karl Leyser opines that Kantorowicz and Cleve as well as other historians are too hagiographic. Leyser writes that Frederick was an individual with many gifts, but was "neither likeable nor reassuring", with a personality damaged greatly during his terrible childhood. Leyser also believes that Cleve exaggerates the role of Frederick's court in the transmission of Aristotelian and Arabic knowledge to Western court: Frederick's court was important but did not play the leading role, let alone monopolizing this process.

In 1992, David Abulafia wrote a revisionist work which argues that Frederick was not a rationalist or an early free-thinker, but a medieval ruler concerned with dynastic goals and also a "victim of his dual inheritance", who was forced to act in his own defense in front of popes who were determined to destroy his power. Regarding his cultural activities, Abulafia opines that "Frederick's cultural patronage was a pale shadow of that of his Norman ancestors" and that his reign marked "the end, not the revival, of convivencia in his southern kingdom."

Dorothea Weltecke notes that despite Abulafia's effort to destroy what he saw as German mystification of a "medieval emperor", most historians today still see Frederick as a man who transcended his time and shared our values of secularism, tolerance and rationalism. Weltecke opines that Frederick's diverse style of ruling in his different lands and his ability to adapt make it difficult to present in a coherent manner his politics, let alone his personality, that in his time, already provoked either "profound adoration or vehement rejection". Regarding his role in Arabic-Christian transfer of knowledge though, Weltecke writes that the Medieval Christian culture was not a monolithic entity unanimously hostile to Muslims, thus it was not necessary for Frederick to possess a hybrid personality to be the competent diplomat and promoter of science he was. Other forces in Latin states sought Muslim cooperation against Frederick, while other religious and secular figures like Alfonso IX of León also played a role in the emergence of universities and the transfer of knowledge from the Islamic world.

Regarding Frederick's charters of 1220 and 1231/1232 (that granted princes great privileges that facilitating territorialization in the Empire), although it is not denied that the strengthening of spiritual (and princely in general) authority came along with the weakening of central power, recent scholarship tends to point out that Frederick only confirmed an already existing reality - the Confoederatio of 1220 only collected and repeated existing individual privileges. Wilson does not see the situation as a negative development, but rather the representation of a division of labour between emperor and princes, which was generally complementing rather than contradicting. Fried writes that Frederick did want to safeguard imperial privileges, but ultimately he had to accept the situation. Benjamin Arnold argues that royal power in Germany remained strong under Frederick. By the 1240s the crown was almost as rich in fiscal resources, towns, castles, enfeoffed retinues, monasteries, ecclesiastical advocacies, manors, tolls, and all other rights, revenues, and jurisdictions as it had ever been at any time since the death of Henry VI. It is unlikely that a particularly “strong ruler” such as Frederick II would have even pragmatically agreed to legislation that was concessionary rather than cooperative, neither would the princes have insisted on such. Therefore, the Statutum in favorem principum and Frederick’s other German legislation were practical solutions to secure the further support of the German princes while he ruled in the peripatetic style typical of a monarch with vast territories.

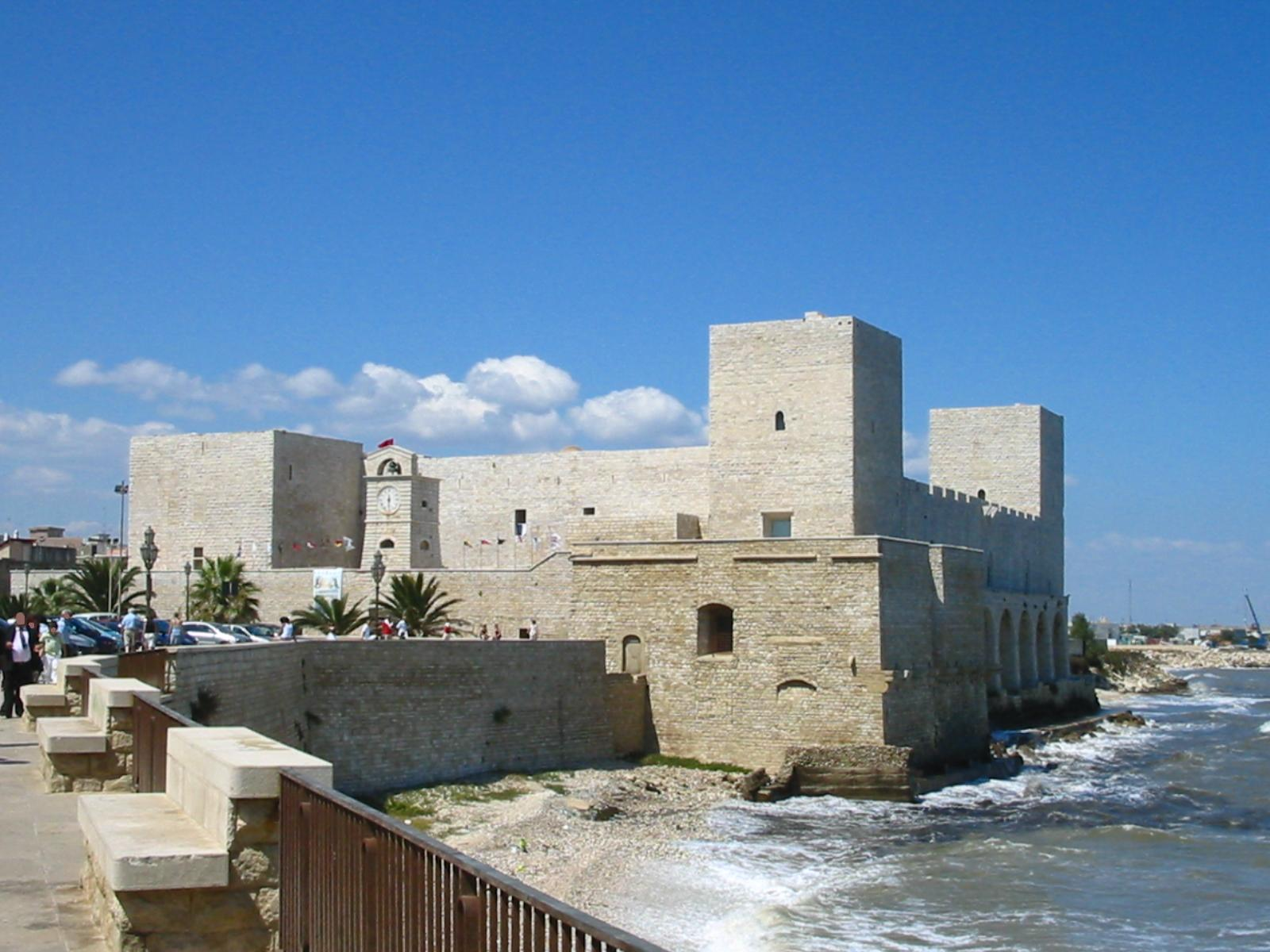
Castello Svevo di Trani, one of the most remarkable fortifications built by Frederick II

=== Italian accounts ===
Interest in Frederick (usually called Federico II di Svevia) from Italian scholars is also very strong, especially in Apulia, where his image has become a foundation for unity. Kurstjens notes that, although vilified in Northern Italy and generally controversial, Frederick is still viewed unanimously as the founder of the Italian language.

According to Roberto Delle Donne, historically, Frederick had been vilified by the Church as a tyrant. From the eighteenth century and especially with the Risorgimento in the nineteenth century, many scholars saw Frederick in a different light. Pietro Giannone's great work Istoria civile del Regno di Napoli (1723) praised Frederick for being an "advocate of jurisdictionalism, centralizer and enlightened despot", as opposed to the past Spanish viceroyalty and the contemporary Emperor Charles VI. Ludovico Antonio Muratori, in his Annali d'Italia (1743–1749), publicized the figure of Frederick as a ruler with “a big heart, great intellectual power and prudence, as well as a love of belles-lettres, which he was the first to bring into his Reich and spread there, in addition to his sense of justice, which was why he was able to develop many optimal regulations, finally his knowledge of different languages...". During the Risorgimento, the new Ghibelline reinterpretation of Frederick II as the "Father of the Fatherland" was expressed most fully in Luigi Settembrini's “Lezioni di Letteratura Italiana", (written in 1848, published between 1866 and 1872): "Frederick II alone was able to create the unity of Italy, because he had the power, the right, the fortitude, because he was born and raised Italian, because he wanted his empire here." Kurstjens also notes that, although his reputation in the North was worse than in the South, both due to his own actions in subjugating their cities and because of Northern Italians' ongoing conflicts with later emperors, with the rise of the Risorgimento, Frederick became a topical matter and came to be seen by many as the precursor to Italian unity.

The 2008 book Lo strano caso di Federico II di Svevia. Un mito medievale nella cultura di massa by the Italian journalist Marco Brando addresses the matter of contemporary mythologization surrounding Frederick II. Brando was inspired by his mentor, the historian Raffaele Licinio. The book caused considerable backlash, especially from scholars in Apolia.

An introduction to the 2014 work Federico II le nozze di Oriente e Occidente. L'età federiciana in terra di Brindisi by historian Antonio Mario Caputo reads:

A man of controversial actions, he was a multifaceted personality, so complex as to raise passionate criticism or exaltation among opposing factions. "Miserly and angry", according to his Guelph detractors; "Wise, enlightened and dispenser of justice", for the Ghibellines. Among the first group, the Franciscan Salimbene de Adam stands out from Parma. He had no doubts about the morality of the emperor, calling him without moderate terms, "nonbeliever, cunning, shrewd, lustful, wicked", and again: "a virulent and accursed man, schismatic, heretic and epicurean". On the other hand, on the Ghibelline side, there was the exhilarating paean of the English monk Matthew Paris: "Among the princes of the earth, Federico is the greatest, stupor mundi and the miraculous transformer". The author of "De rebus gestis Friderici imperatori" gives excessive praises, that "he was a man of great heart and yet was able to temper his own magnanimity with the great wisdom within". The judgment of Giovanni Villani seems balanced in his Chronicle: "he was a man of great valor, wise in scripture and natural wisdom, he knew Latin and the vernacular, German and French, Greek and Saracen. And he was dissolute in lust in more ways, and he held many concubines and mamluks in the guise of Saracens; he wanted to abound in all bodily delights, and lived an almost epicurean life. And this was the main reason why he was an enemy of the clerics and of the Church ". His character, certainly, was with multiple contradictions: crusader in the Holy Land and simultaneously a friend of the Sultan of Egypt, anointed by the Lord and sympathizer of doctrines with the odor of heresy, absolute king in Sicily and feudal princeps in Germany. Thanks to his contribution, the "Sicilian school" was able to compete with the ones in Provence and Catalan. He favored the Islamic culture but sent for the concentration camps in Lucera more than fifteen thousand Saracens. Ultimately, a wonderful chameleon: he inherited from the Swabians ideals of imperial supremacy, from the Normans methods of centralized government, from Arabs love for philosophy and mathematics. Federico was also man of peace. He gave proof of that in 1228, when he landed in the Holy Land to take away the Holy Sepulcher from the infidels by obtaining Jerusalem through the diplomacy. His naturalistic interests and his passion for women must also be considered. The 'Puer Apuliae' was a promoter of young people; at his court he introduced many, entrusting them to the care of experts, so that they could refine their aptitudes and vocations. A complete and modern man Federico [...], who, if he had lived in our days, as well as arousing controversy and dissension, would have received mostly favors and would have been praised beyond measure [...].

In 2005, after an initiative by the Treccani, an encyclopaedia dedicated solely to Frederick II, named Enciclopedia fridericiana, was composed by a committee headed by Ortensio Zecchino.

=== On Frederick's national identity and cultural inclinations ===
Frederick's national identity or cultural inclinations has always attracted international discussion. Historian James Bryce from the nineteenth century compared him with Otto III:

Out of the long array of the Germanic successors of Charles, he is, with Otto III, the only one who comes before us with a genius and a frame of character that are not those of a Northern or a Teuton. There dwelt in him, it is true, all the energy and knightly valour of his father Henry and his grandfather Barbarossa. But along with these, and changing their direction, were other gifts, inherited perhaps from his Italian mother and fostered by his education among the orange-groves of Palermo—a love of luxury and beauty, an intellect refined, subtle, philosophical. Through the mist of calumny and fable it is but dimly that the truth of the man can be discerned, and the outlines that appear serve to quicken rather than appease the curiosity with which we regard one of the most extraordinary personages in history. A sensualist, yet also a warrior and a politician; a profound lawgiver and an impassioned poet; in his youth fired by crusading fervour, in later life persecuting heretics while himself accused of blasphemy and unbelief; of winning manners and ardently beloved by his followers, but with the stain of more than one cruel deed upon his name, he was the marvel of his own generation, and succeeding ages looked back with awe, not unmingled with pity, upon the inscrutable figure of the last Emperor who had braved all the terrors of the Church and died beneath her ban, the last who had ruled from the sands of the ocean to the shores of the Sicilian sea. But while they pitied they condemned. The undying hatred of the Papacy threw round his memory a lurid light; him and him alone of all the imperial line, Dante, the worshipper of the Empire, must perforce deliver to the flames of hell.

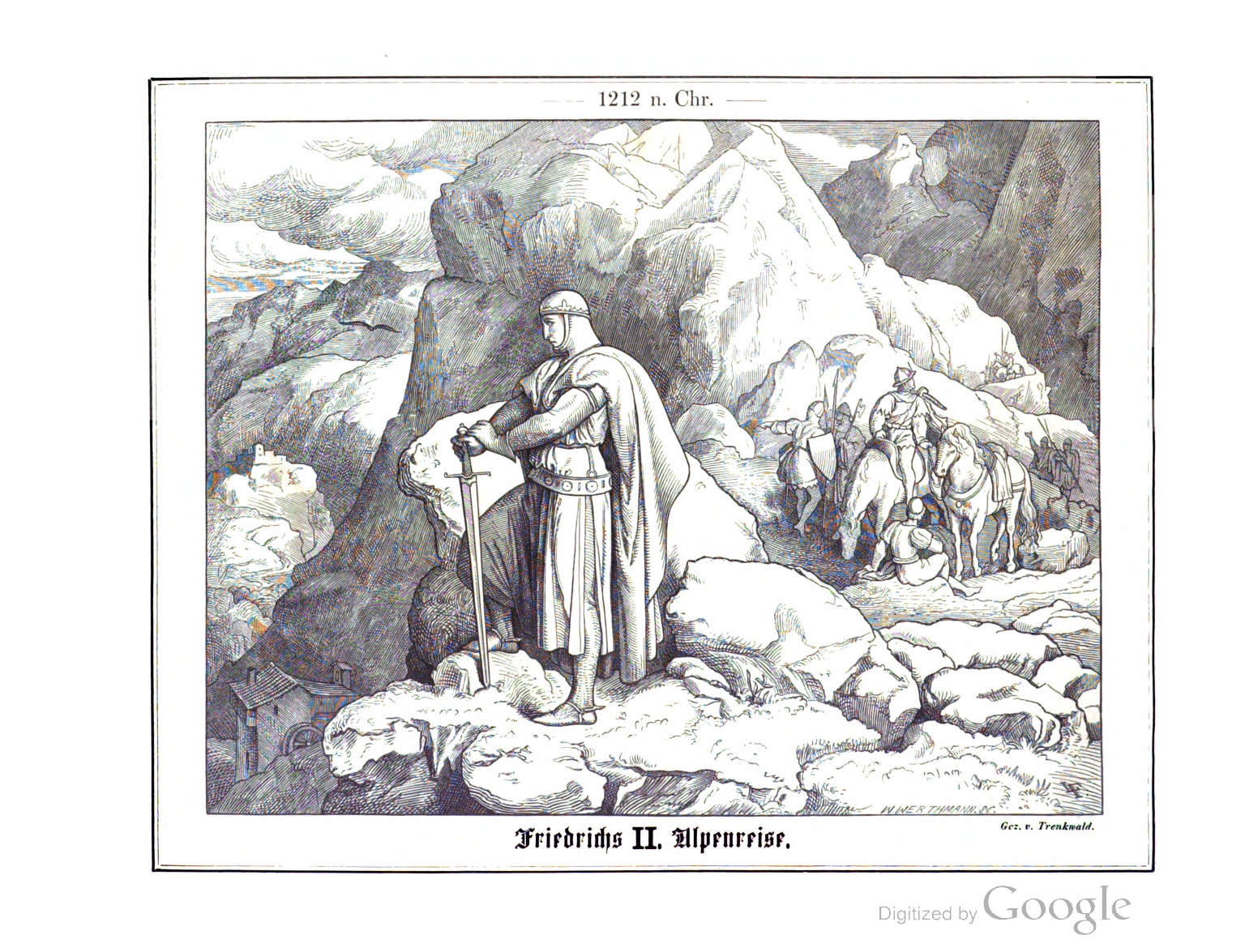
Friedrich II Alpenreise ("Frederick on his Alpine journey") by Josef Matyáš Trenkwald (nineteenth century).

Commenting on Olaf B. Rader's work Friedrich II. – Der Sizilianer auf dem Kaiserthron. Eine Biographie ("Frederick II, a Sicilian on the imperial throne. A biography", C.H. Beck, 2010), Georg Vogeler notes that explaining a person's actions in terms of regional cultural imprint is hardly a stable method, and stereotypes run counter to each other, too: Theo Broekmann's theory (that Rader relies upon) about the contemporary societies is that the ruler could settle power conflicts north of the Alps with ritual subjugation, while in the south he needed to exert his power consistently and strictly; meanwhile, Petrarch's interpretation of the situation is that Italians showed mercy, while German mistook it for weakness.

While modern Germans tend to consider Frederick an Italian, like Caputo, German historians Kurstjens and Houben also agree that Frederick was a product of both worlds, a fact he was conscious about. Houben opines that, "Making the Kingdom of Sicily the basis of imperial policy was a pragmatic decision, in consideration of the resources available there, and a promising decision given the practical impossibility of being equally present across his empire, north and south of the Alps". Houben also stresses the transcultural dimension of Frederick, who as an intellectual, was also receptive to Islamic and Jewish influences. (Note: "Königreich Sizilien zur Basis seiner imperialen Politik zu machen, war aufgrund der dort zur Verfügung stehenden Mittel eine pragmatische und angesichts der praktischen Unmöglichkeit in seinem Großreich gleichermaßen nördlich und südlich der Alpen präsent zu sein, erfolgversprechende Entscheidung.") Frederick's national "blurriness", as opines Hannes Obermair, contributed to his unfavorable perception compared to the better known and more streamlined Frederick II of Prussia.

=== On Frederick as a military leader ===
Frederick was a capable battlefield leader, able to manoeuvre and prevail in difficult situations. John Barker opines that his greatest victory was the battle in 1237 at Cortenuova, gained him primacy in Northern Italy for the rest of his reign. Despite occasional setbacks such as the loss of the "Victoria" camp in 1248, he was able to subjugate large parts of the Romagna to improve the overall situation. He was preparing to invade Lyon when he died suddenly in December 1250. His death brought an end to the campaign and would ultimately lead to the end of the Hohenstaufen. Daniel P. Franke compares Frederick with his grandfather Barbarossa. Franke opines that both emperors were capable commanders who made the best decisions possible in their most famous battles (Legnano and Cortenuova) despite the different outcomes. Frederick II won his campaign because his "diplomatic freedom of action" was better and he had a larger and more competent set of allies. Yet war did not prove to be the decisive modifier for both emperors. Despite Legnano, Barbarossa later was able to advance his goals a lot with (quiet and unheroic) diplomacy and statesmanship, while in the long term, Frederick II's opponents recovered while the emperor suffered more personal trauma.

Abulafia was one author who disparages Frederick's military skills, saying that he preferred civil affairs and hesitated to test himself in battle.

Books

- Cleve, Thomas Curtis Van (1972). The Emperor Frederick II of Hohenstaufen, Immutator Mundi. Oxford: Clarendon Press.
- Abulafia, David (1992). Frederick II: A Medieval Emperor. Oxford University Press. ISBN 978-0-19-508040-7.
- Tragni, Bianca (1994). Il mitico Federico II di Svevia (in Italian). Adda. ISBN 978-88-8082-197-7.
- Fornari, Carlo (2000). Federico II: condottiero e diplomatico (in Italian). M. Adda. ISBN 978-88-8082-373-5.
- Houben, Hubert (2008). Kaiser Friedrich II. 1194–1250: Herrscher, Mensch und Mythos (in German). W. Kohlhammer Verlag. ISBN 978-3-17-018683-5.
- Vigni, Benito Li (2011). Federico II: il principe sultano (in Italian). Armando Editore. ISBN 978-88-6081-978-9.
- Rader, Olaf B. (10 October 2012). Kaiser Friedrich II (in German). C.H.Beck. ISBN 978-3-406-64051-3.
- Kantorowicz, Ernst (13 June 2019). Frederick the Second: Wonder of the World 1194-1250. Head of Zeus. ISBN 978-1-78954-084-0.
- Mendola, Louis; Alio, Jacqueline (2023). Kingdom of Sicily 1130-1266: The Norman-Swabian Age and the Identity of a People. Trinacria, New York. ISBN 978-1-94363-939-7.

Websites

- Manselli, Raoul. "Federico II di Svevia imperatore in "Enciclopedia Dantesca"". www.treccani.it (in Italian).
- "Federico II: enciclopedia fridericiana" (in Italian). Instituto Della Enciclopedia Italiana. 2006.
- "FEDERICO II imperatore in "Enciclopedia Italiana"". www.treccani.it (in Italian).
- Wolf, Gunther. "Frederick II Biography, Accomplishments, & Facts | Britannica". www.britannica.com.

== Legends and anecdotes ==
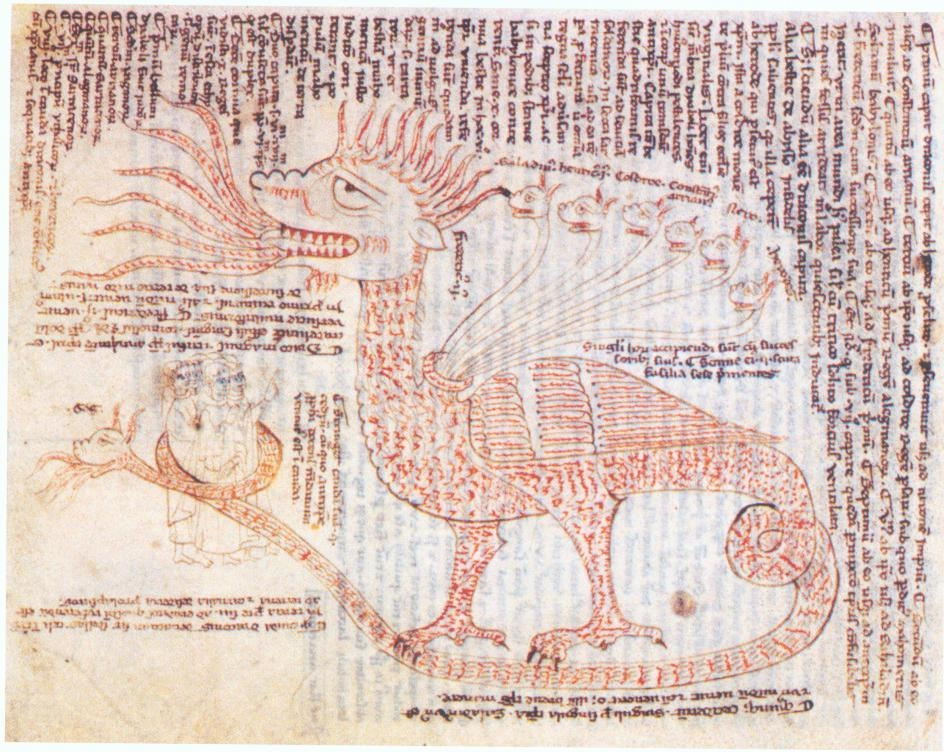
Depiction of Frederick II as the seventh and largest head of the dragon of the Apocalypse, along with the tyrants Herod, Nero and Saladin as the heads of a monster. The dragon's tail encircles a group of Franciscans. Giovanni Villani, Chronica, 14th century, Rome, Biblioteca Apostolica Vaticana, Codex Vat. Lat. 3822, fol. 5r.

The excommunication of Frederick was rejected by many during his lifetime, including some priests. An anecdote from the Church of Saint-Germain l'Auxerrois recounted: "[...] three centuries earlier, that a priest astonished his congregation — and afterwards, when the incident was reported, the whole of Europe — by his mode of pronouncing the excommunication decreed by Pope Innocent IV against the Emperor Frederick II. 'Hearken to me, my brethren,' he said. 'I am ordered to pronounce a terrible anathema against the Emperor Frederick to the accompaniment of bells and lighted candles. I am ignorant of the reasons on which this judgment is based. All I know is that discord and hatred exist between the Pope and the Emperor, and that they are accustomed to overwhelm each other with insults. Therefore I excommunicate, as far as lies in my power, the oppressor, and I absolve the one who is suffering a persecution so pernicious to the Christian religion.' ... The priest, as might have been expected, was rewarded by the Emperor and punished by the Pope."

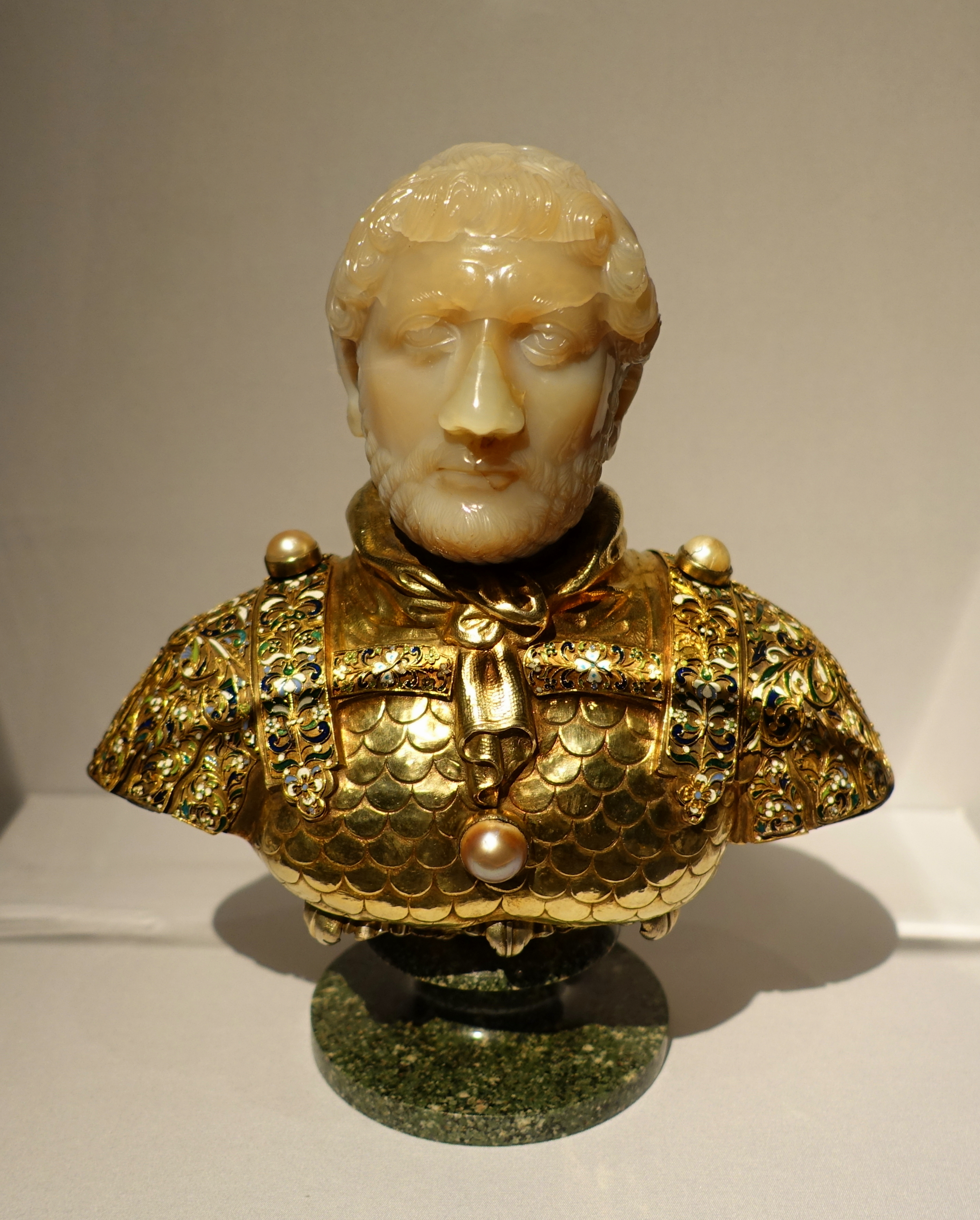
Emperor Hadrian, head by court workshop of Frederick II Holy Roman Emperor, Sicily, c. 1240, chalcedony, clothing, Sicily, c. 1600, gilt silver, gold - Metropolitan Museum of Art - New York City - DSC06927. "The age of Frederick Il paved the way towards a new apprecialion of classicism. to a new period when the most intelligent interpreters as well as the acutest students of Antiquity are to be sought among the artists rather than among the men of letters. Before the rise of humanism the real antiquarians were the artists."

According to Kantorowicz, "Frederick was the last emperor to be deified or to find a place among the stars of heaven." Contemporaneous writers celebrated him as the Sun King and associated him Sol Invictus. His birthday was within a day of the birth of Christ and the Sun. After his death, he was prophesied to return to establish the kingdom of heaven. A legend foretold that Frederick would live three hundred and sixty-seven years, and impersonators still appeared years after his death, leaving many Floretines in doubt.

Meanwhile, his detractors saw in him the Antichrist. His image as a tyrant was blended with the ancient figure of Nero. The Joachimites expected Frederick to return not to restore the empire, but to complete the destruction of the degenerate Church. Later, in nationalist times, this myth was transferred to his grandfather Frederick Barbarossa. Petrarch also likened Frederick II and Nero, praising Frederick's patronage of the founders of Italian literature, but disturbed by the cruelty of Frederick to Pietro della Vigna, which evoked Nero and Seneca.

In the fifteenth century, he was still identified as the Last World Emperor, who would fight the Antichrist. This belief created hope as well as fear, which was renewed when another Frederick was crowned emperor in 1452.

Huub Kurstjens opines that Frederick was a mythomoteur, a myth-engine or the driving force behind myths, regarding which some historians blame Frederick himself as the creator. Boccaccio exaggerated Constance's age when she gave birth to Frederick, calling her a "wrinkled old woman", and attached ruinous prophecy to Frederick's birth, that he would bring about the downfall of the Kingdom of Sicily.

There are legends about him in Italy. Dante mentions the legend about one of his favorite methods of punishment, which was putting the accused inside leaden mantles and then throwing them into a fire.

In Germany, legends tend to confuse Frederick with his grandfather, Frederick Barbarossa. The famous Kyffhäuser (see also: legends about Frederick Barbarossa) was originally about Frederick II, but later became primary associated with Barbarossa, as the figure of the grandson was gradually superseded by that of the grandfather. In Italy, there is the corresponding legend of Frederick II sleeping under Mount Etna.

Kantorowicz recounts a German legend: "In 1497 a carp was caught in a pond at Heilbronn, in whose gills, under the skin, a copper ring was fastened, with a Greek inscription which stated that Frederick II, with his own hand, had released this fish." The Humanists of the time decided that Frederick II, whose hands had the life-giving quality, wanted to promote the study of Greek in Germany.

== Depictions in arts ==
=== Arts under Frederick II ===
==== Architecture ====
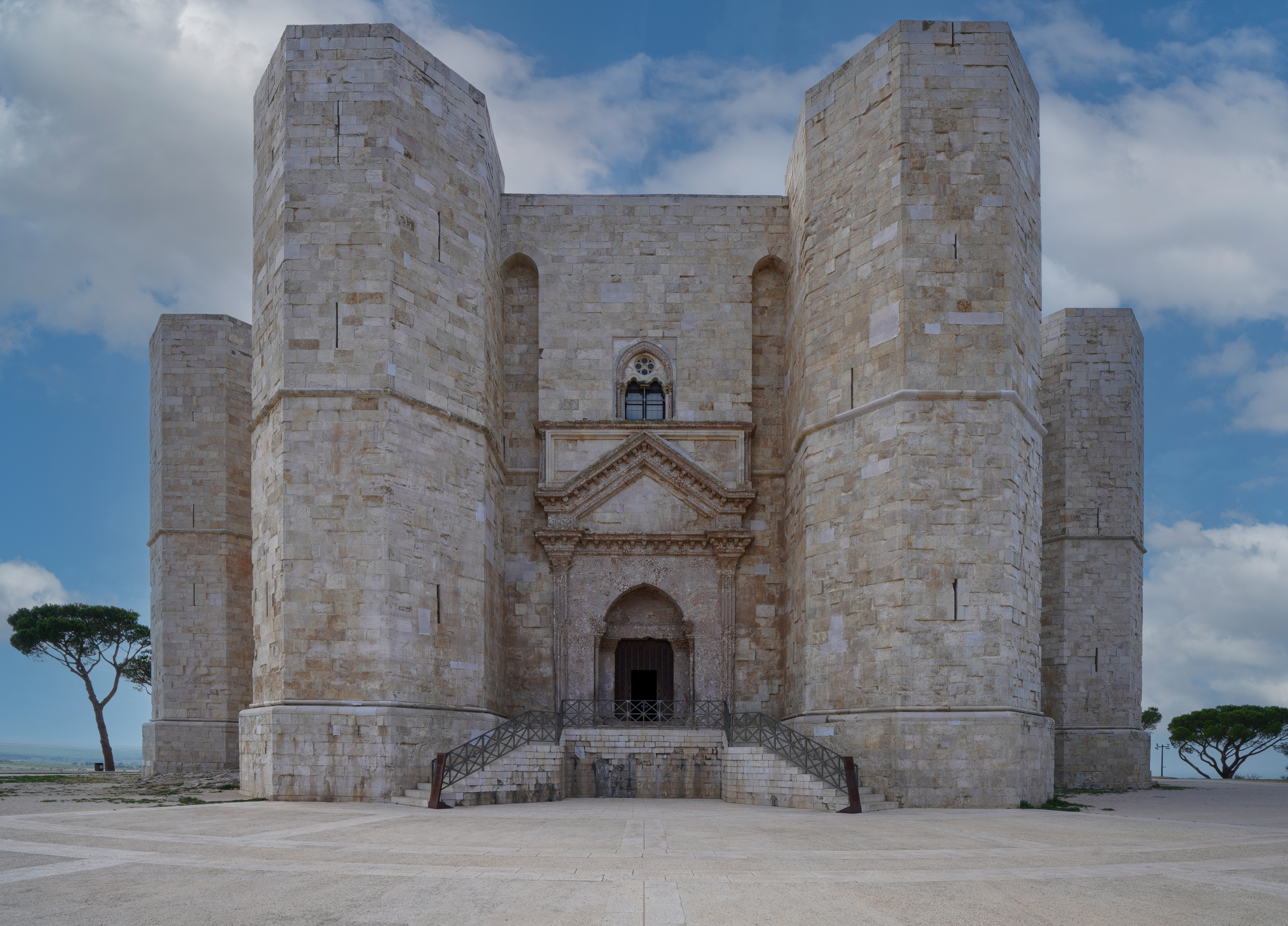
Castel del Monte

Frederick, as patron and architect, built many castles in Italy, in which he combined German, Italian, Arabic and classical Roman elements.

- His most famous castle is the Castel del Monte, which according to some, represents the imperial crown or the heavenly Jerusalem. The octagonal shape, the "perfect image of eternity", represents the earthly might of the Christian Caesar.

Ubaldo Occhinegro considers the choice of "regular, symmetrical floor plans" as the result of organizational and technical considerations though: "Many researchers have misunderstood this choice as a simple rational or artistic will, connected with the eclectic figure of the Emperor, with his centralizing policy and pragmatic, forgetting, however, the contingent construction choices responding fully to the needs of Frederick. He had to prepare a powerful organizational machine that goes from the extraction of the stones, the pre-fabrication of the elements directly in the stone quarry, to the distribution and installation of them among the construction sites across the country [...] It is therefore logical that the provision and use of pre-fabricated elements, needed a project set on the basis of predetermined size and length ratios: a kind of standardization of that we'll meet only many years later in Catalan Gothic. It's for this reason that, comparing homogeneous architectural elements (windows, doors, arches and lintels) in different castles far from each other, many dimensions appear to be coincident."

- The Gate of Capua reused the forms of classical architecture and was designed to represent the emperor's authority. The Gate was destroyed in 1557 by the Spanish but images survive, including one in a 1507 manuscript now in Vienna (Man.3528). Sculptures from the Gate are now preserved by the Museo Campano in Capua. Frederick has himself depicted as Christ or Antichrist seated in Judgement.

==== Poetry ====
Frederick, a poet himself, promoted poetry in his court, which helped to nurture what would later become the Italian language. He and his poets adopted and Italianized many forms and concepts of Occitan love poetry, thus starting the Italian lyric tradition.

Frederick and his poets were also influenced by the Arab culture in their poetry. Giacomo da Lentini and his group seemed to utilize their knowledge about the way colloquial Arabic was used in the genre of zajal in their use of the Sicilian dialect.

There were also links between Sicilian poetry and German minnesang, which in turn was inspired by the troubadours or trouvères brought to the court of Barbarossa by Frederick's grandmother Beatrix of Burgundy.

- The works of his poets (who were in many cases officials) like Georgios of Gallipoli in Calabria or Pietro della Vigna created a supernatural and classical atmosphere that would influence later legends. The figure of the Emperor-Messiah tended to fuse with Zeus or the Sicilian God of Justice.
- The famous contemporary Walther von der Vogelweide wrote the poem An Kaiser Friedrich II. dedicated to him.

==== De arte venandi cum avibus ====
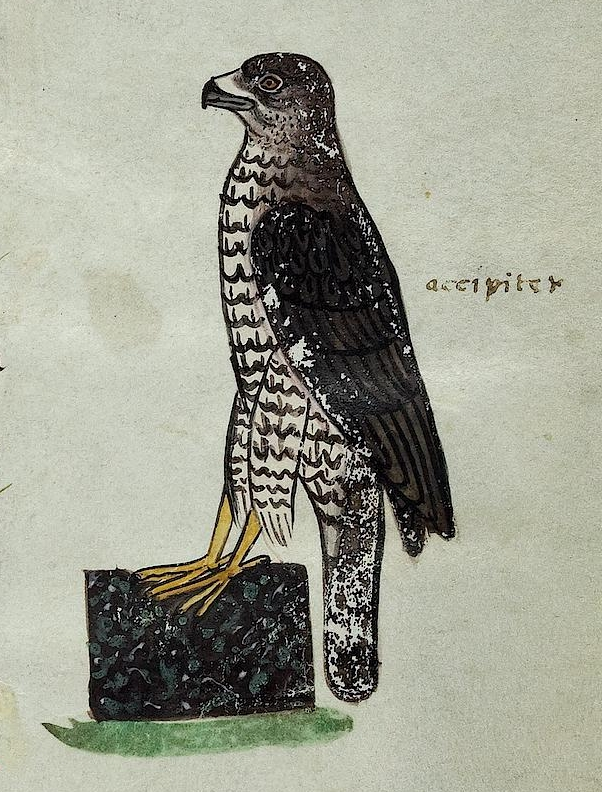
Sparrowhawk (accipiter), 025r, 1258-1266.

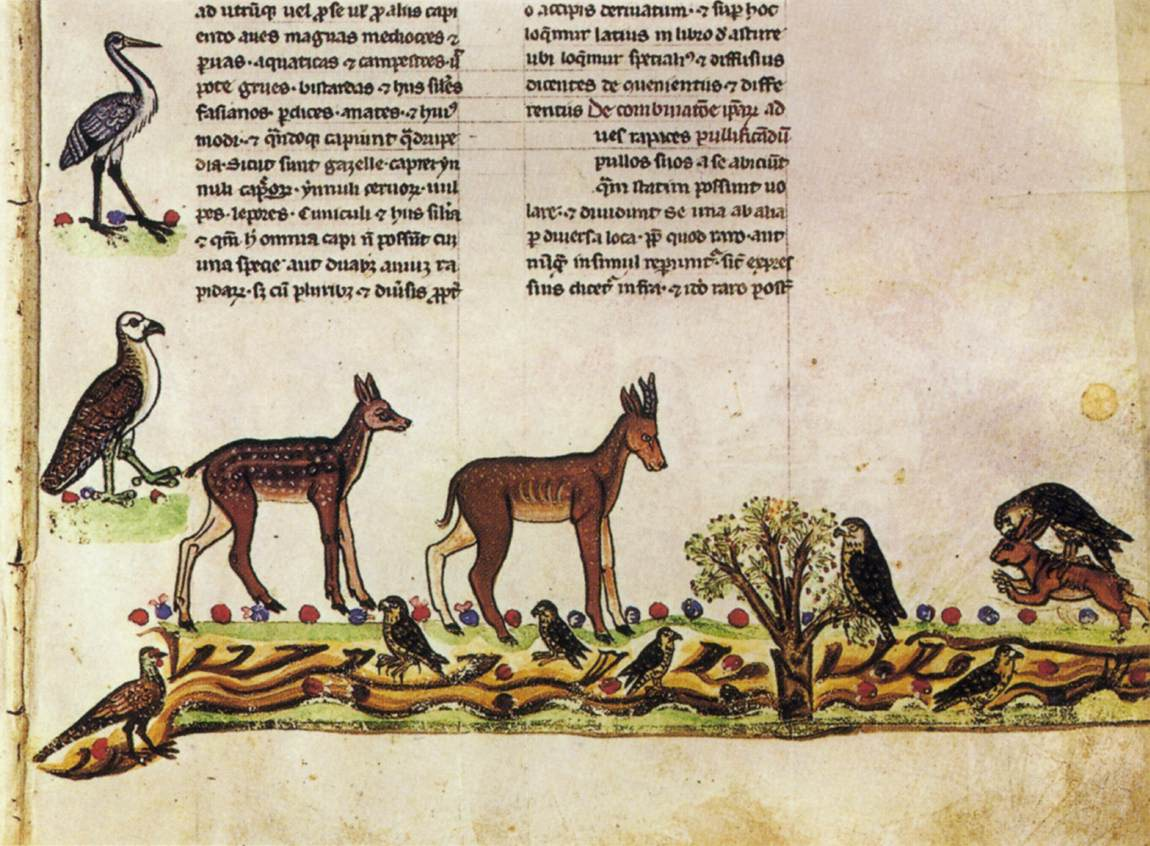
Deer and birds, MS Pal. lat. 1071 folio 49 recto

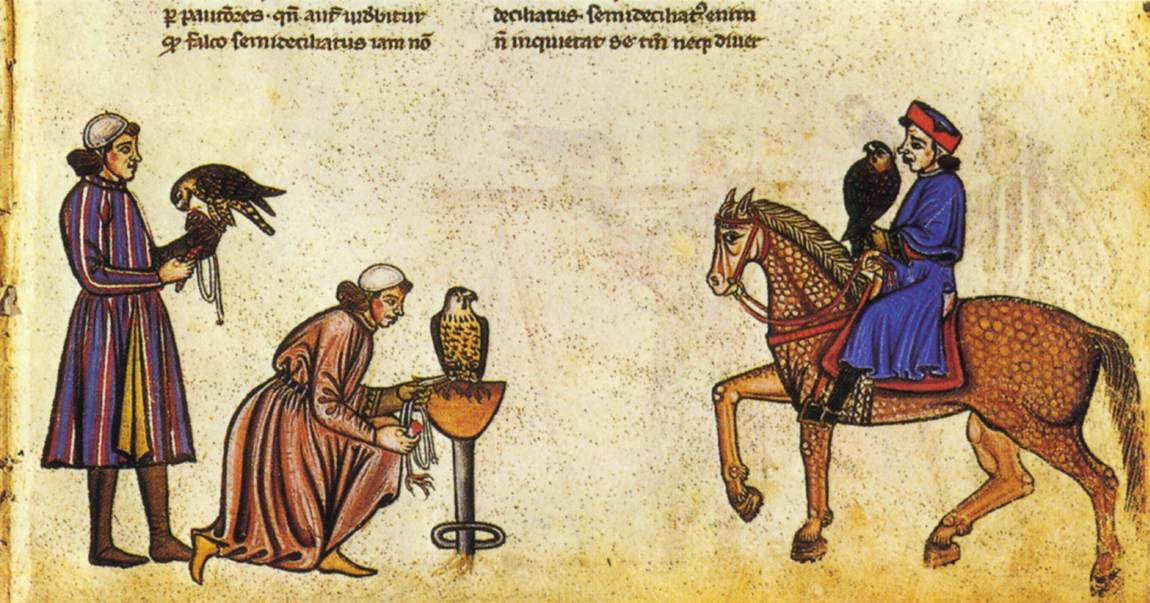
Falconers, MS Pal. lat. 1071 folio 81 recto

The book De arte venandi cum avibus is the first treatise on the subject of falconry. It is also "the first zoological treatise written in the critical spirit of modern science."

The art of falconry had been brought to Italy by his grandfather Barbarossa.

=== Later depictions ===
==== Visual arts ====
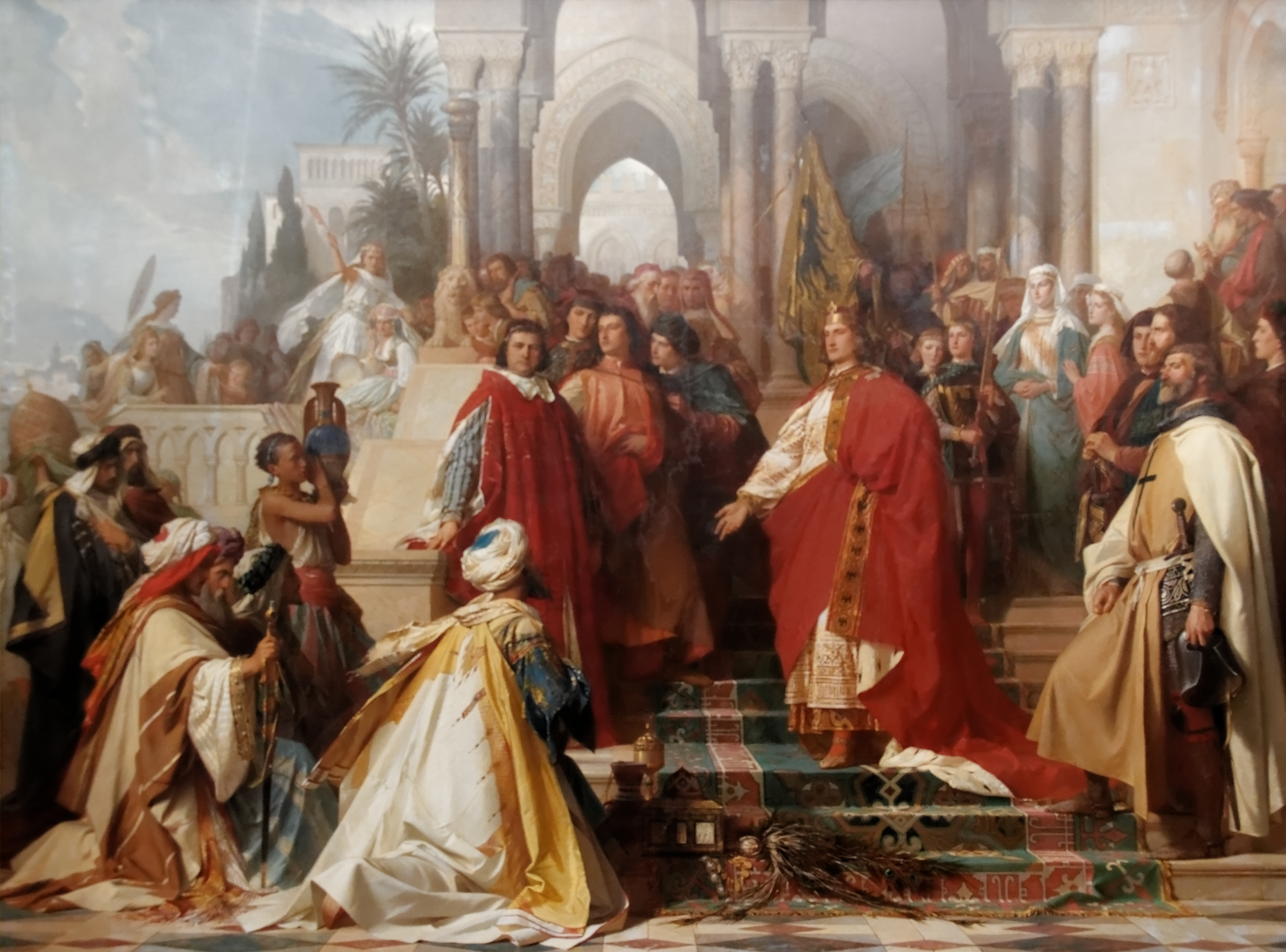
The Court of Emperor Frederick II in Palermo by Arthur von Ramberg

- Around 1572–1573, Giorgio Vasari painted for the Sala Regia Vaticana the scene of Gregory IX excommunicating Frederick.
- In 1810, Pelagio Palagi painted Il destino regale di Federico II di Svevia Infante ("The royal destiny of prince Frederick of II of Swabia in his childhood", oil on canvass).
- In 1821, Johann Gottfried Schadow created Frederick's bust in the Walhalla, a hall of fame for German heroes built by Ludwig I of Bavaria.
- Frederick's portrait in the Kaisersaal in Frankfurt am Main is part of a series depicting emperors who reigned from 768 to 1806 (created from 1839 to 1853). This portrait is painted by Philipp Veit (1793 – 1877) in 1843.
- Alexander Zick (1845–1907) painted the Kaiser Friedrich II. empfängt in Stolzenfels seine Braut Isabella, depicting Frederick welcoming Isabella in Stolzenfels.
- Federico II riceve un libro da Michele Scoto is an 1860 work by Giacomo Conti, now preserved in the Palazzo dei Normanni, showing Frederick II receiving a book from Michael Scot.
- In 1864, Ferdinand Wagner created the fresco painting Einzug Kaiser Friedrich II in commemoration of his 1212 entry into Konstanz.
- The Court of Emperor Frederick II in Palermo was painted in 1865 by Arthur von Ramberg. Alina Payne opines that Frederick and his entourage are shown as possessing superiority and also arrogance and suspicion to the Muslim delegation.

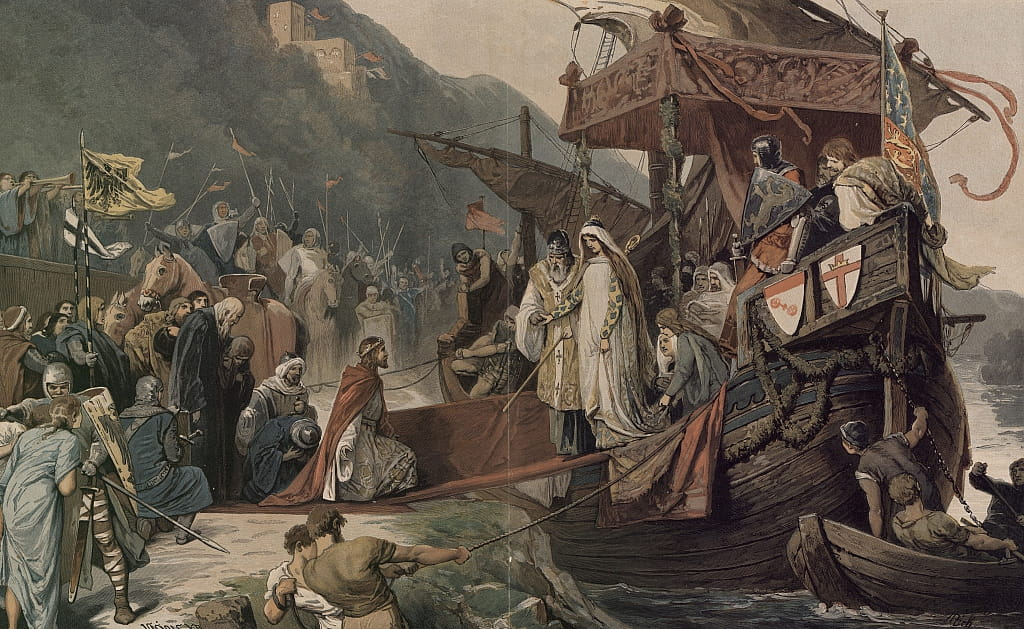
Emperor Frederick II receives at Stolzenfels his bride Isabella by Alexander Zick (MeisterDrucke-1196495)

- In 1880, Hermann Wislicenus produced the Hofhaltung Friedrichs II. in Palermo for the Kaisersaal in the Kaiserpfalz Goslar.
- Heinrich von Rustige (1810 – 1900) paint the Kaiser Friedrich II . und sein Hof zu Palermo, also depicting Frederick holding court in Palermo.
- The Nascita di Federico II a Jesi, depicting Frederick's birth, by Italian painter Luigi Detto Sordo, was executed during the later half of the nineteenth century.
- Josef Matyáš Trenkwald (1824—1897) made a series of artworks depicting Frederick's life, which are used as illustrations for the work Die deutsche Geschichte in Bildern, Volume 1 by Friedrich Bühlau, including Friedrichs II. Alpenreise ("Frederick II on the Alpine journey"), "Friedrich II. zieht in Jerusalem ein" ("Frederick II entering Jerusalem"), Friedrich II . empfängt seine Braut Isabella von England ("Frederick II receiving his bride Isabella of England"), Petrus von Vineis am Krankenlager Friedrich's II. ("Peter von Vineis at the sick bed of Frederick II").
- Hermann Kaulbach (1846–1909) painted the Die Krönung der Hl. Elisabeth durch Kaiser Friedrich II., depicting Frederick crowning Saint Elizabeth of Hungary. This is a "high point of religious life" in Frederick's career.

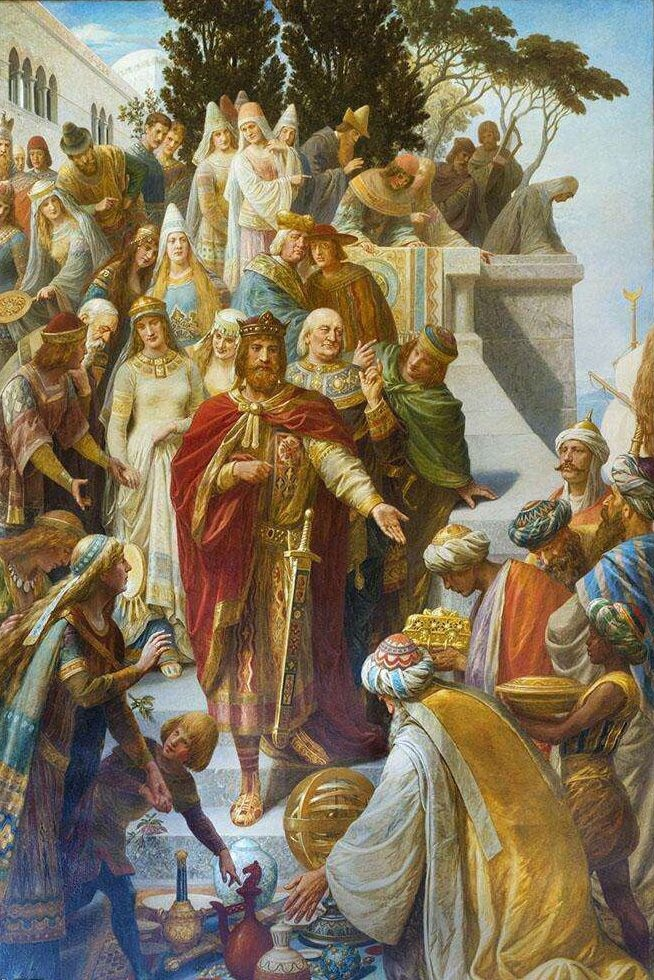
Hofhaltung Friedrichs II. in Palermo by Wislicenus

- Kaiser Friedrich II. entläßt nach Preußen ziehende Deutsch-Ordensritter, 1236, depicting Frederick dismissing the Teutonic Order, who were moving into Prussia, was painted by Peter Janssen between 1893 and 1895.
- Věnceslav Černý (1865–1936) produced the work Věnceslav Černý - Výstup mezi Václavem I. a císařem Fridrichem II ("Clash between Wenceslaus I and Emperor Frederick II").
- In 2000, Florence and Stuttgart set up marble stelae, designed and built by sculptor Markus Wolf, in commemoration of the 750th year of Frederick's death (image of the stele near, Castel Fiorentino, in Florence. This is Frederick's place of death. Markus Wolf is a member of the Komitee der Stauferfreunde, an association that has financed the erection of such stelae, which are dedicated to the Hohenstaufen dynasty (called Stauferstele), in various European countries. He also builds a wooden sculpture of Frederick in Plieningen.
- In 2009, a monumental bronze statue of the emperor holding a falcon, created by the sculptor Maurizio Carnevali, was donated to the city of Lamezia Terme by the Lions Club di Lamezia Terme.
- In 2013, Oria dedicated a statue to Frederick to celebrate the town twinning event that connects the Italian town with Lorch in Germany. Both towns consider themselves Stauferstadt (a Hohenstaufen city or town).
- In 2014, artist Christian Siller created a statue of Frederick for Konstanz.

==== Films ====
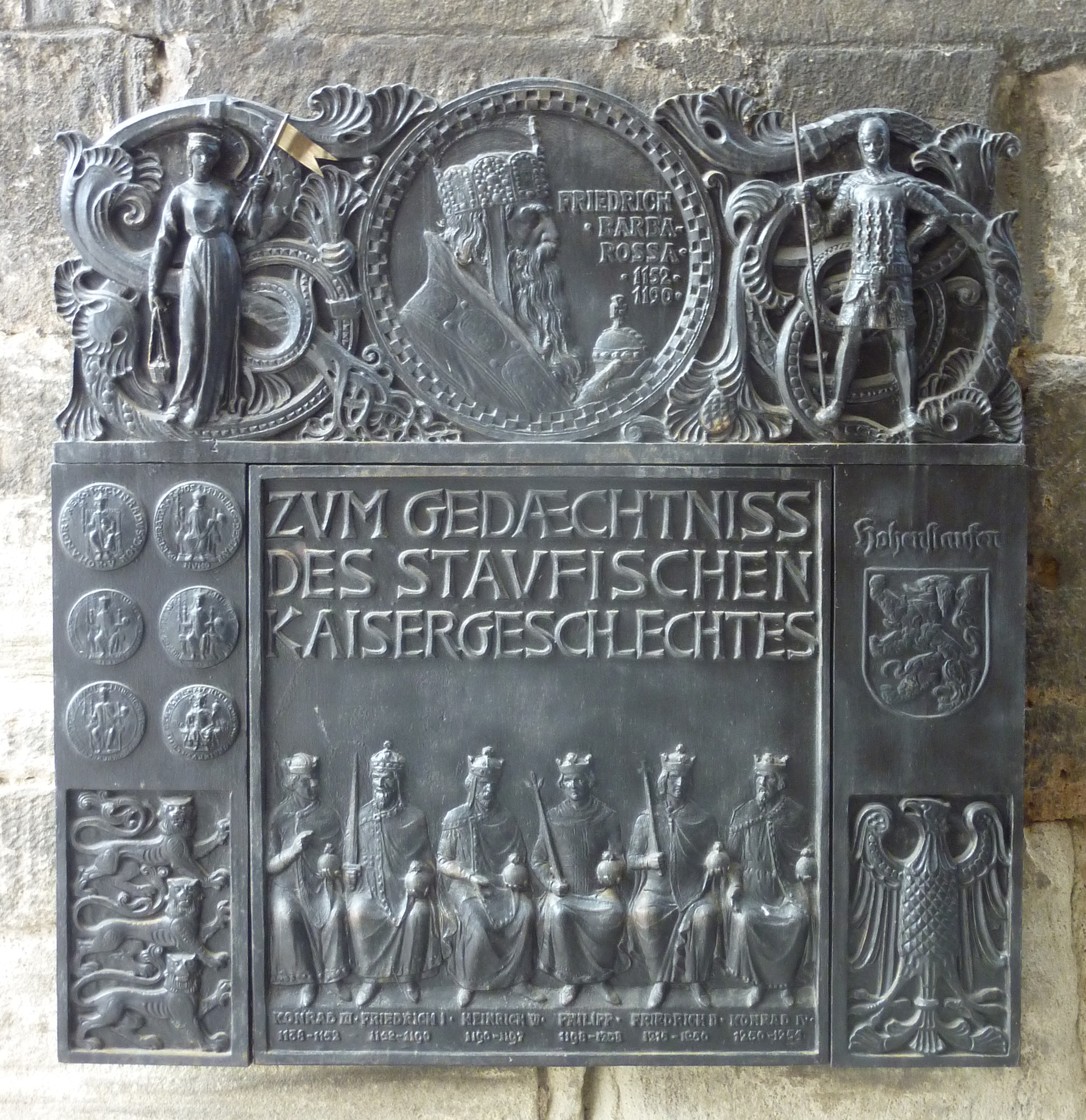
Commemorative plaque to the Hohenstaufen dynasty in Schwäbisch Gmünd

- Stupor mundi is 1998 film directed by Pasquale Squitieri and based on Aurelio Pes's poem Ager sanguinis. The film explores Frederick, portrayed by Lorenzo Crespi, as a mythical figure with both revolutionary and despotic aspects. It was commissioned by Nicola Cristaldi, then president of the Federico II Foundation, for the 900th Anniversary of the Sicilian Assembly.
- He is portrayed by Robert McNeir in the 1998 Io non ho la testa directed by Michele Lanubile. The movie is about the reign of Frederick II, when the emperor and scholars tried to promote new ways of learning.

==== TV series ====
- Der Gigant auf dem Thron, Friedrich II., the fifth part of the 1995 documentary series Streifzüge durch das Mittelalter by BBC and SDR, is about Frederick.
- Friedrich II. und der Kreuzzug (2010), directed by Christian Feyerabend and Daniel Sich, narrated by Prof. Dr. Stefan Weinfurter, the second episode of the second season of the documentary series "Die Deutschen" by ZDF, is about Frederick, who is portrayed by Michael Pink.

==== Theater ====
- In 1828, Karl Immermann produced the play Kaiser Friedrich II., a tragedy that depicts the triumph of Catholicism over liberal thinking.
- In 1837, Ernst Raupach wrote a cycle of sixteen plays titled "Die Hohenstaufen". The fifth part is about Frederick II.
- Richard Wagner found Friedrich Raumer's depiction of the emperor's character fascinating, but struggled to find artistic channels for him, and decided that Frederick's son Manfred offered a more tractable subject. Between 1841 and 1842, he wrote the text of a five-act opera named the Sarazenin (never set to music), describing the story of Manfred and Fatima, who was the daughter of Frederick and a Saracen princess.
- Adolf Widmann wrote the five-act tragedy Kaiser und Kanzler (or Friedrich II. und Vineis) in 1855.
- In 1858, Carl Schwebemeyer wrote the dramatic poem "Herz und Haupt". The characters include Frederick, Pope Gregory IX and Pietro della Vigna.
- P.von Probst wrote the five-act drama Kaiser Friedrich II in 1861.
- In 1862, Johann Georg Fischer's Kaiser Friedrich der Zweite von Hohenstaufen was performed. It was published by Cotta in the next year. The characters in the tragedy include Frederick, Bianca Lancia, Frederick's sons Manfred and Enzio, Pietro della Vigna, Raniero Capocci.
- Ignaz Heinrich von Wessenberg wrote the tragedy Kaiser Friedrich der Zweite von Hohenstaufen in 1863.
- A.Teichmann wrote the Friedrich II. von Hohenstaufen in 1867.
- In 1894, Eduard Locher published Friedrich der Zweite, a trauerspiel in Berlin.
- In 1900, Friedrich Carl Calebow (1875–1922) published the five-act trauerspiel Friedrich der Zweite. Here, Pietro della Vigna, presented as a fanatically religious ascetic, poisoned Frederick to attain eternal salvation.
- In 1900, Max Halbe published the work Kaiser Friedrich II: Schauspiel in fünf Akten.
- In 1951, Bernt von Heiseler produced Kaiser Friedrich II., the centrepiece in his Hohenstaufentrilogie.

==== Music ====
- Die legende von der Heiligen Elisabeth is an opera-oratorio with a prologue and four scenes, written by Franz Liszt, libretto in German by Otto Roquette (composed between 1857 and 1862). The first performance (in English) of the opera was in London, 1876.
- He is a character in the opera Rudolf der deutsche Herr by Carl Loewe (1796 – 1869).
- The Italian singer and musician Franco Battiato composed the opera Il cavaliere dell'intelletto, commissioned by the Sicilian Regional Government for the celebrations of the Eighth Centennial of Frederick's birth, with the libretto of Manlio Sgalambro and the first premiere hosted at the Palermo Cathedral on 20 September 1994.

==== Prose ====
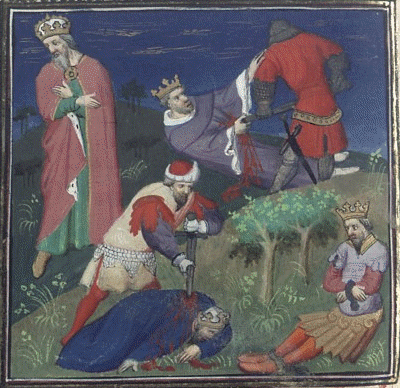
Frederick II in view of the murders of his son Manfred, his grandson Konradin, and the imprisonment of Enzio. From Giovanni Boccaccio, illuminated in the book De casibus, France, 15th century. BNF Fr.226, f.261v.

- Boccaccio's Decameron evokes Frederick in several tales. He is mentioned in V.5, then appears in V.6 as a character. The falconer V.9 bears the name Federigo.

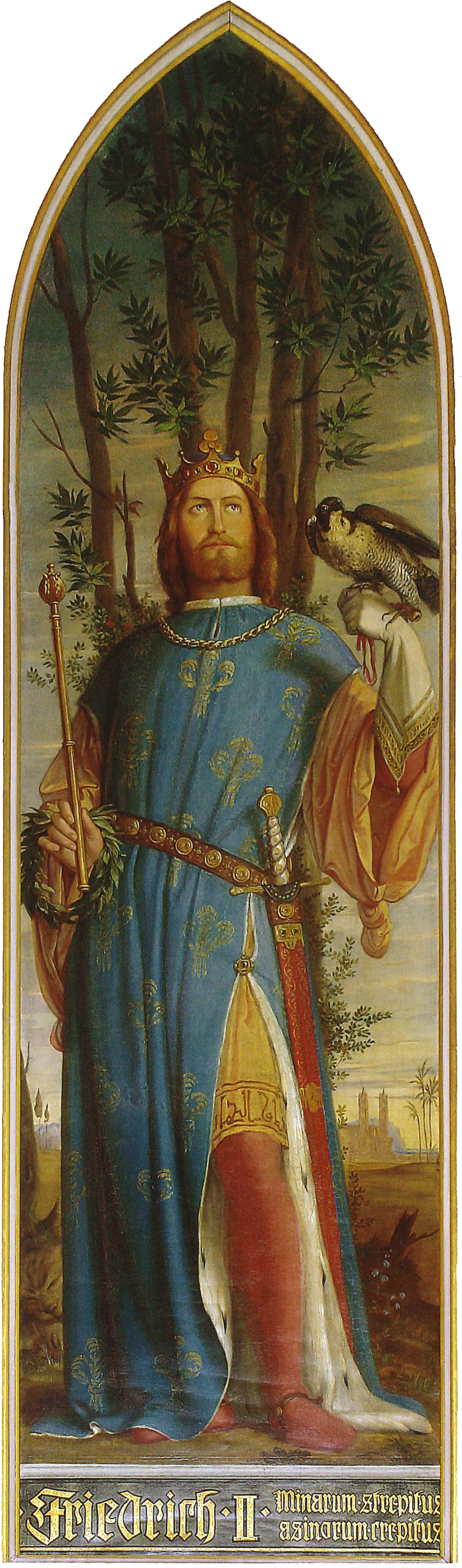
Frederick II's portrait (1840) by Philipp Veit in the Kaisersaal, Frankfurt am Main, Nr. 23

- Frederick was a character in Conrad Ferdinand Meyer's 1898 prosework Petrus Vinea. The plot sketchings shown to Fritz Koegel and Adolf Frey show Petrus's wife as being in love with Frederick; the chancellor's tragic death as the result of an ill Frederick, who has become suspicious and cruel (Petrus chooses to drink a healing potion Frederick wants to test on a Lombard prisoner, knowing beforehand that it is poison).
- In 1938, R.B.Bardi (Rachel Berdach, born in Budapest, 1878) published the influential novel Der Kaiser / die Weisen und der Tod. Sigmund Freud wrote, "Your mysterious and beautiful book [the Emperor, the Sages and Death] has pleased me to an extent that makes me unsure of my judgment. I wonder whether it is the transformation of Jewish suffering or surprise that so much psychoanalytical insight should have existed at the court of the brilliant and despotic Staufer which makes me say that I haven't read anything so substantial and poetically accomplished for a long time. . .. [W]ho are you? Where did you acquire all the knowledge expressed in your book? Judging by the priority you grant to death, one is led to conclude that you are very young."
- Der Falkenschrei: Friedrich II. von Hohenstaufen (1940) is a novel by Lothar Schreyer.
- The Great Infidel: A Biographical Novel is a notable work about Frederick II. The author is the historian and archaeologist Joseph Jay Deiss. The work touches the matter of Frederick's bisexuality.
- He is the main antagonist in the novel The Quiet Light (1950) by Louis de Wohl. It narrates the life of Thomas Aquinas and the contrasts between the Church and the Empire, with Frederick II presented as a ruthless and energetic big player in the story.
- In Aus dem Tagebuch einer Schnecke (1972), a fictional work by Günter Grass, the recurring figur of the rider's statue might have been based on Frederick II.
- The Star of the Wind by Somerset Struben De Chair is a 1974 fictional work based on the life of Frederick.
- In Heinrich von Ofterdingen (1802), a novel the eponymous fabled poet Heinrich von Ofterdingen by Novalis, the titular character encounter Frederick and visits the tomb of Hans Sachs.
- He is the main character in the Zeit lässt steigen dich und stürzen: Kaiser Friedrich II. und die letzten Staufer : historischer Roman, a 1999 novel by Eberhard Cyran.
- Il falco di Svevia, translated to English as The Falcon of Palermo, is a 2005 novel by Maria R. Bordihn
- La sposa normanna (2005), written by Carla Maria Russo, is a novel about the life of Constance of Sicily, who tries to protect her baby.
- Er lebt und lebt nicht: Traumbuch über Kaiser Friedrich II. is a 2012 novel by Angela Gantke about the woman Agnes, who time-traveled to meet Frederick as equals.
- Stupor mundi is a 2016 graphic novel by the Tunisian-French writer Néjib, written in French and published in 2016 (the book is translated into Italian as Stupor mundi by Stefano Sacchitella, published in 2017; the German edition is Stupor Mundi – Das Staunen der Welt, published by Schreiber&Leser in 2017). The story is about the Arab scholar Hannibal Qassim El Battouti, who landed in the Castel del Monte with his paralyzed daughter named Houdê and masked servant El Ghoul and tried to seek Frederick II's protection.
- Federico. L'avventura di un re by Marzio Bartoloni is a 2020 novel about the adventure of the young king Federico (Frederick II).
- L'ultimo segreto di Dante (2021) by Giulio Leoni is a novel about Dante Alighieri. An important character is a mysterious knight calling himself a direct descendant of Federico II and hiding in Lucera with the remnants of the Islamic mercenaries who once served the emperor.
- Il cuoco dell'imperatore (2021) by Raffaele Nigro is a novel about the court life under Frederick II through the eyes of Guaimaro delle Campane from Melfi, the emperor-king's cook.
- La dama eloquente. Vita e destino di Federico II. Regnum is a 2021 fictional work about the love triangle between Frederick and the poets Selvaggia and Pier della Vigna
- Il leone di Svevia. Federico II, l'imperatore che sfidò la Chiesa by Roberto Genovesi is a 2022 novel about the emperor: On his death bed, Frederick summons Ahmed Addid, his childhood friend and head of the Saracen guard and asked him how the world would remember him. Ahmed gives a sincere account of the story of his lord, though which a life different from what his subjects know is revealed.

==== Poetry ====
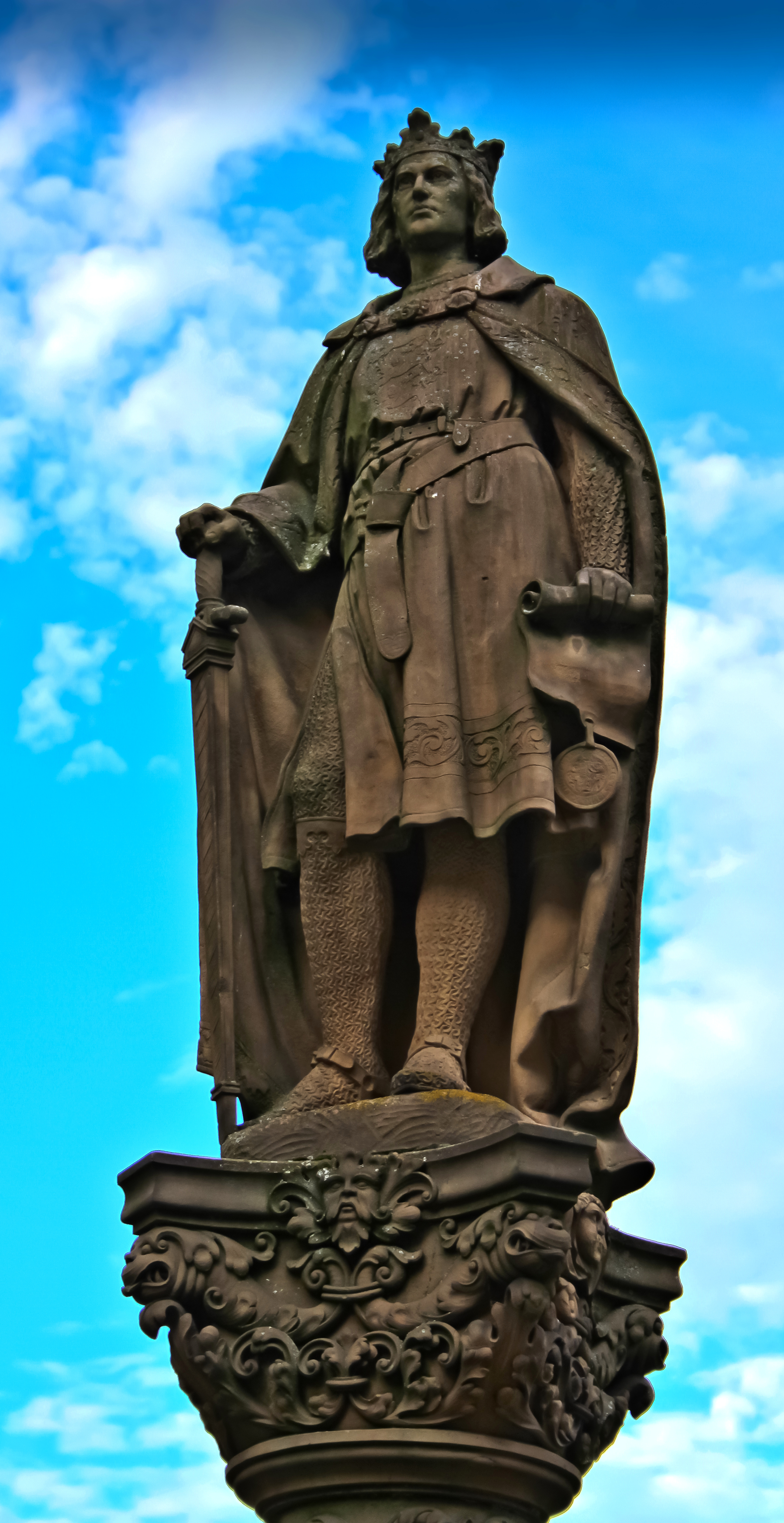
Frederick II's statue, Reutlingen

- Petrarch described or alluded to Frederick and his Sicilian scholars in several works such as the Triumphs, Collatio laureationis...etc.
- Frederick Schiller (1759 – 1805) planned an epic poem about Frederick, but never fulfilled it.
- In Goethe's Faust, Frederick's Swabian Hohenstaufen Castle in Enna that Goethe visited in 1787 appeared as representation of German Middle Age. Goethe was another example of the confusion between Frederick and his grandfather Barbarossa. Goethe seemed to mix the two until 1824, the year he Friedrich von Raumer's Geschichte der Hohenstaufen.
- Stefan George's 1909 Die Gräber in Speyer, depicting Frederick in monumental form, is used by Kantorowicz at the beginning of his monograph.
- He is a prominent character in Robert Browning's narrative poem Sordello (1840).
- In 1867, Adolf Schneider wrote the dramatic poem Kaiser Friedrich II. von Hohenstaufen.
- In 1887, Conrad Ferdinand Meyer published the notable poem Kaiser Friedrich der Zweite. The poem describes Frederick on his death bed, saying his last words to Manfred.
- Rilke wrote the poem Falconry about Frederick.

In the poem, the emperor spurned "plans which had sprung up in him", "tender recollections" and "deep inner chiming" to focus on the "frightened fledgling falcon's sake, whose blood and worries he taxed himself relentlessly to grasp."

In exchange he too seemed borne aloft,
when the bird, to whom the lords give praise,
tossed radiantly from his hand, above
in that all-embracing springtime morning
dropped like an angel on the heron.

(Translation by Edward Snow)

Dobyns remarks that the poem also reflects Rilke, who put aside his ambitions and family to focus on poetry, that drops upon the reader like the falcon on the heron.

== In philosophical writings ==
- In the 15th century, Frederick became admired by many early German humanists (also influenced by anti-papal and imperial-patriotic influence) such as Dietrich Engelhus or Nicholas of Cusa. Dietrich Engelhus wrote about Frederick: Germanus origine et Italus conversatione, vir catholicus, pius et providus (German by origin and Italian by behaviours, Catholic man, pious and provident), as well as a crusader, persecutor of heretics and legislator whose successes were ruined by jealous popes) – an image corresponding entirely to their ideal model of a ruler. Nicholas of Cusa described the emperor as "Fridericus Secundus, vir utique in ecclesia strenuissimus ac fidei propugnator."
- The description of Frederick II as "the first modern man on the throne" comes from the historical philosopher Jacob Burckhardt.
- Frederick II, together with Alcibiades, Julius Caesar, and Leonardo da Vinci are four people Friedrich Nietzsche use as potential examples of his concept Übermensch, those who reject "eternal truth" and create their own values, which will prove dominant and become seen as "truths". Nietzsche's concept of history is called "monumental history", which would influence the works of Stefan George and Kantorowicz mentioned above. Nietzsche describes Frederick as "that great free spirit, that genius among German emperors". Nietzsche ascribes to him the spirit of a "true German Mephistopheles."
- The mystic and thinker Rudolf Steiner on the other hand thinks that the histories of great men like Frederick, or his grandfather Barbarossa, or Richard the Lionheart might be interesting, but have no significance for the true knowledge of history, which should be taught with focus on its great impulses.
- When explaining that behaviours of a God have the same nature as those of despots, since they impose their will on nature, Ludwig Feuerbach uses the following decree of Frederick II as example: "Since lése-majesté against God is a greater crime than against men, and since God visits the sins of the fathers on the children, the children of heretics shall be deemed unfit for all public offices and posts of honor, with the exception of those children who have denounced their fathers."
- Ernst Cassirer sees Frederick II as a man who was a mystic personally, yet able to produce "one of the earliest examples or a complete secularization of political life".

== Commemoration ==
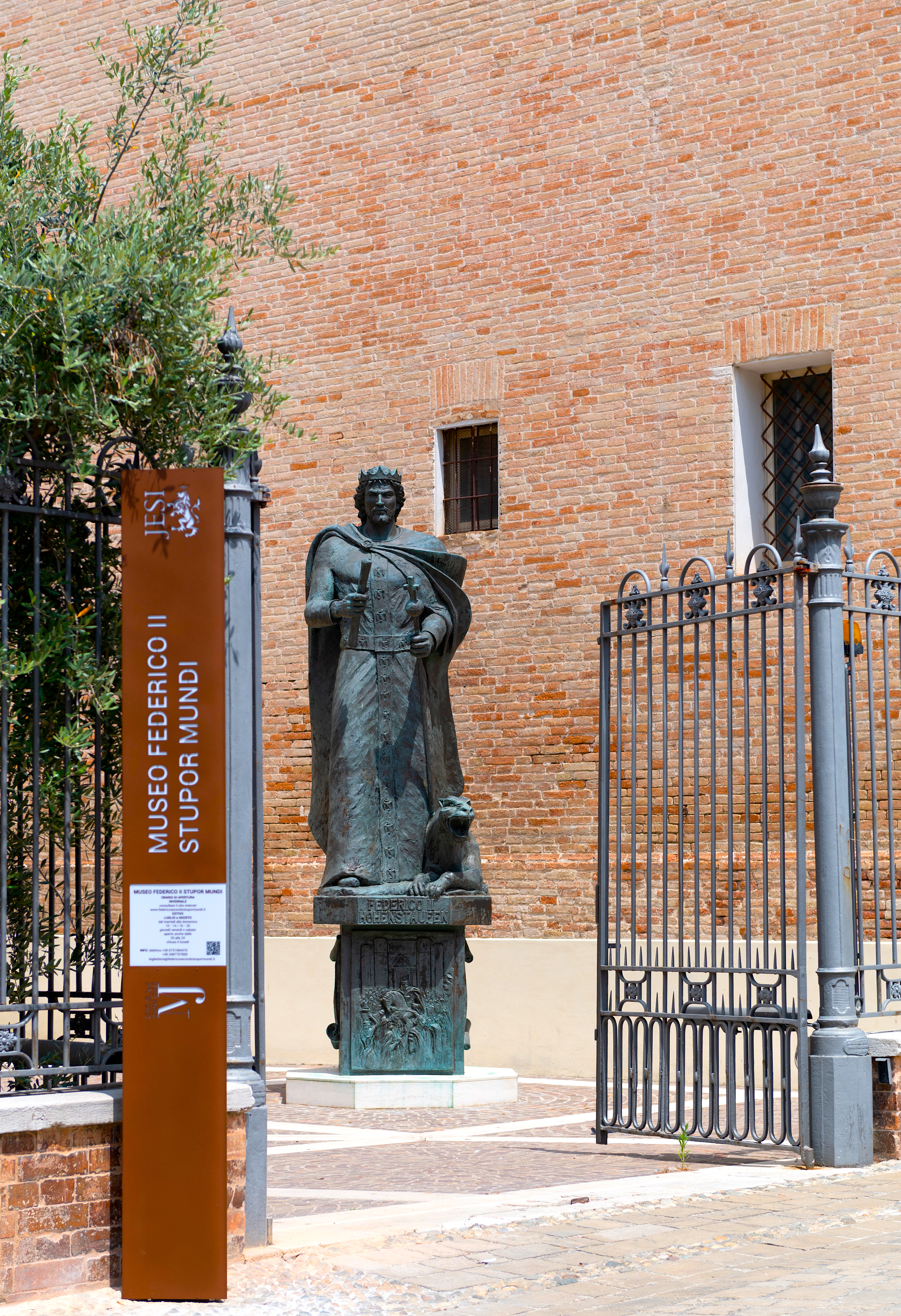
Statue of Frederick at Museo Federico II Stupor Mundi, Jesi.

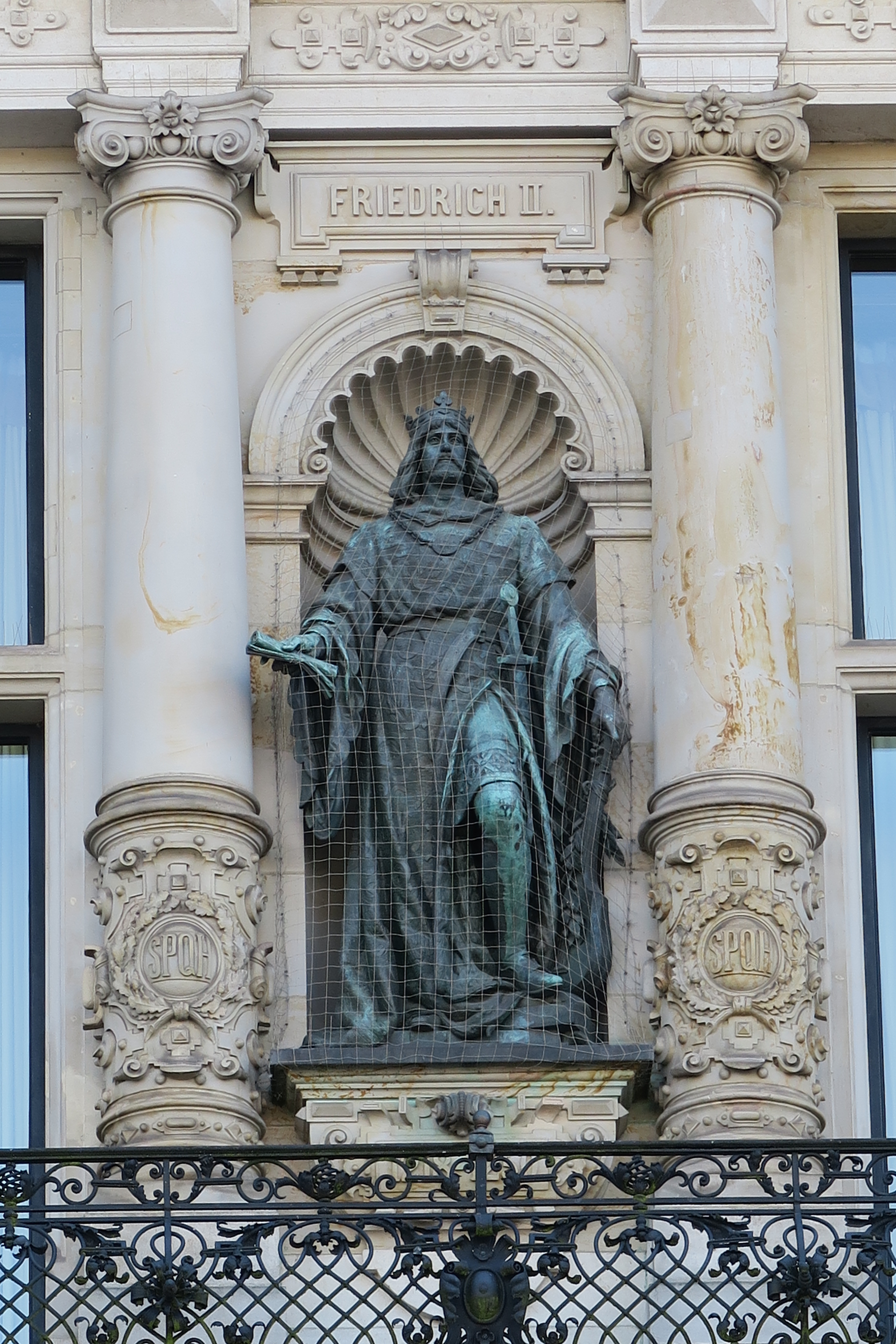
Frederick II's statue at the Hamburg City Hall by Carl Friedrich Echtermeier (1845–1910).

Museo Federico II Stupor Mundi is a Museum in Jesi, that is dedicated to the emperor. There is also the Emperor Frederick II Museum in Lagopesole Castle, Province of Potenza.

In April 2022, the Italian Cultural Institute in New York organized the exhibition "Constancia. Women and Power in the Mediterranean Empire of Frederick II" (the women referred here were Constance of Hauteville, (1154-1198), mother of Frederick II; Empress Constance of Aragon (1184 ca.-1222), his first wife; Empress Constance (1231 – circa 1307/13), daughter of Frederick II and Bianca Lancia, wife of Emperor of the East John III Ducas Vatatze; Queen Constance (1249-1300), daughter of Manfred.

A 2022 series of international cultural events to promote the figure of Federick is being carried out by the Federico II Study Center and Solunto Foundation, beginning with the conference "Puer apuliae, stupor mundi" in Rome on 30 May, then with events in Bordeaux on 19 June and Bratislava on 15 September.

== See also ==
- Castel del Monte, Apulia
- Castello Normanno-Svevo (Bari)
- Castello dell'Imperatore
- City Gate of Capua
- De arte venandi cum avibus
- Ad apostolicae dignitatis apicem
- Liber ad honorem Augusti
- Muslim settlement of Lucera
- University of Naples Federico II
- Cultural depictions of Frederick I, Holy Roman Emperor
- Cultural depictions of Otto I, Holy Roman Emperor
- Cultural depictions of Otto III, Holy Roman Emperor
- Cultural depictions of Conrad II, Holy Roman Emperor
- Cultural depictions of Charles IV, Holy Roman Emperor
- Cultural depictions of Sigismund, Holy Roman Emperor
- Cultural depictions of Maximilian I, Holy Roman Emperor
- Cultural depictions of Charles V, Holy Roman Emperor
