= Josef Matyáš Trenkwald =

Czech/Austrian painter

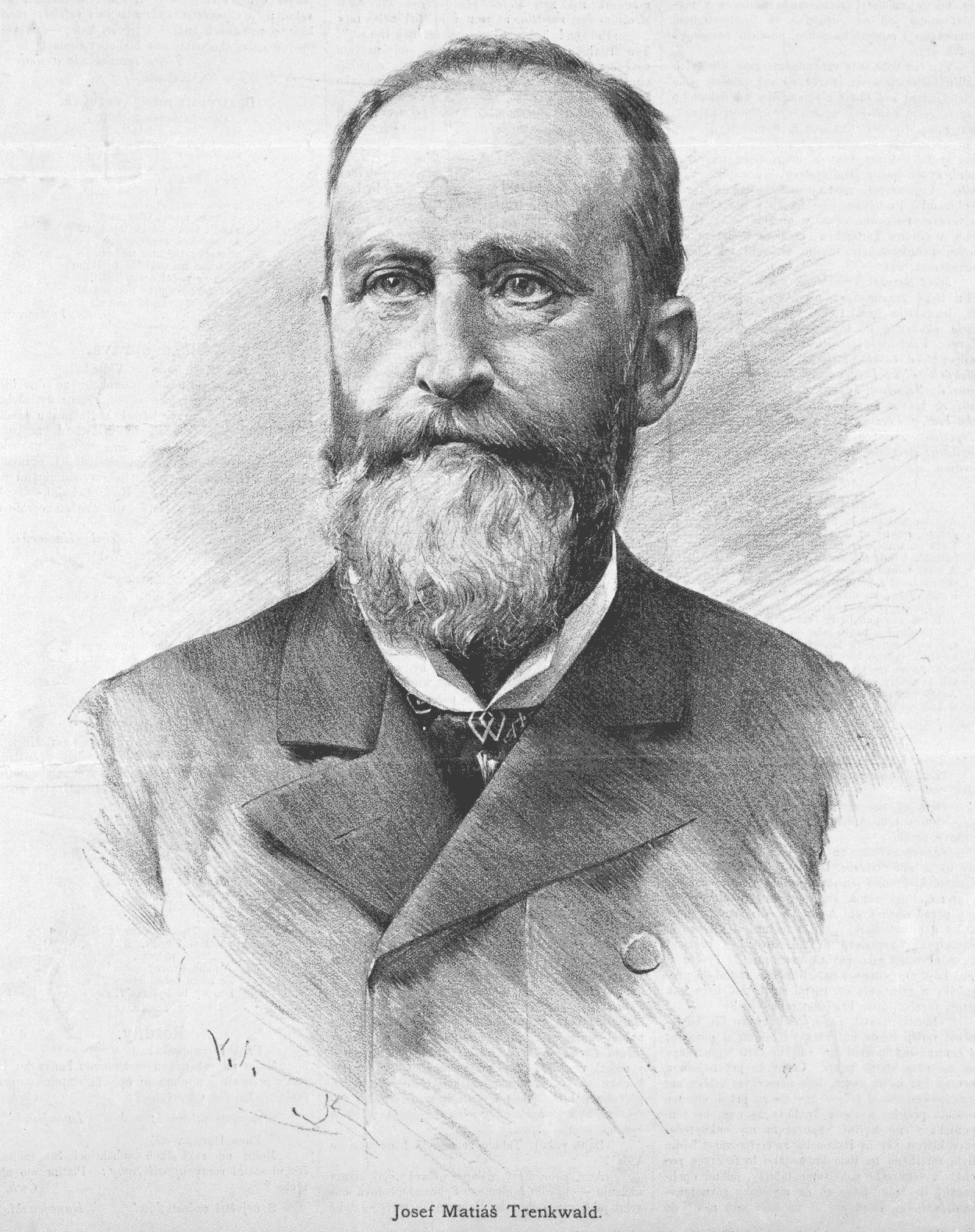
Josef Matyáš Trenkwald. Drawing by Jan Vilímek (1887)

Josef Matyáš Trenkwald (also known as Joseph Matthias Trenkwald, German: Josef Mathias (von) Trenkwald; 13 March 1824 — 28 July 1897) was a Czech-Austrian painter. He was best known for his religious and historical paintings.

== Biography ==
Josef Matyáš Trenkwald was born on 13 March 1824 in Prague. His father was a tax commissioner. He studied art with Christian Ruben at the Academy of Fine Arts, Prague from 1841 to 1851, where he began painting scenes from Czech history, especially the era of the Hussite wars. In 1852, he moved to the Vienna Academy of Fine Arts and illustrated the Book of Songs by Heinrich Heine.

For five years, from 1856 to 1861, he lived in Rome on a scholarship. In 1865, he was appointed director of the academy in Prague and held that position until 1872, when he became a professor at the Vienna Academy. He died in on 28 July 1897 in Perchtoldsdorf, at the age of 73.

He is best known for his large canvases Leopold the Glorious enters Vienna on his return from the Cross campaign (1872), Thomas Munzer, King Enzo, etc. In addition, Trenkwald created frescoes in several Vienna and Prague churches. Together with Karel Svoboda and Antonín Lhota, he decorated the "Belvedere Queen Anne" (a royal summer palace) with scenes from Czech history.

== Selected paintings ==
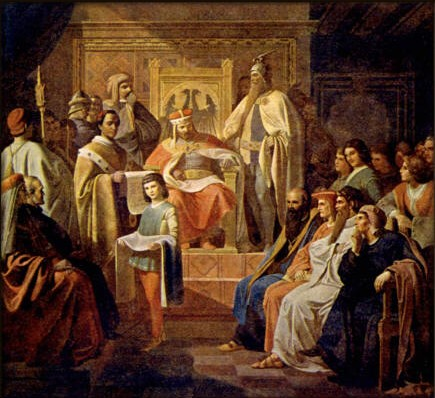
The Establishment of
Prague University

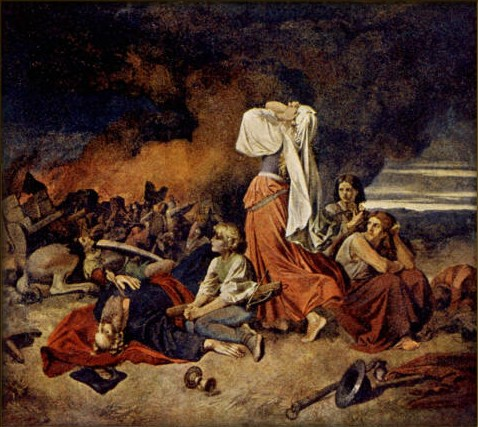
The Battle of Lipany

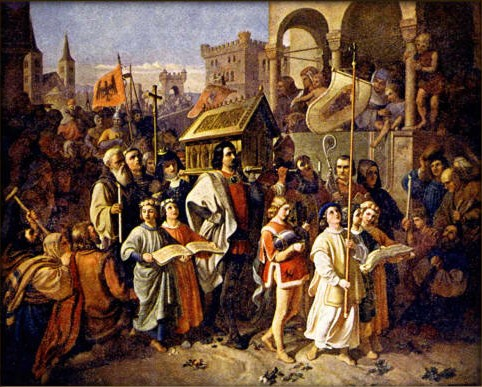
Transferring the Remains of
Bishop Adalbert
