= Shanghai Rush =

- Shanghai Rush logo
- Presented by: Brian Yang
- Winners: Alice & Richard
- No. of legs: 12
- No. of episodes: 12

Release
- Original release: May 3 – July 19, 2009

Additional information
- Filming dates: March 12, 2009 – Late March 2009

Shanghai Rush (Chinese: 冲刺上海; pinyin: Chōngcì Shànghǎi) is a Chinese reality television program broadcast by International Channel Shanghai as part of the TV scheduling leading up to the 2010 Shanghai Expo and designed to showcase the city. The series borrowed heavily from the themes of the American reality show The Amazing Race and was produced by Fly Films. The show aired in early 2009, and ended broadcast in July of the same year. Shanghai Rush focused on travel throughout the municipality of Shanghai. After finishing Shanghai Rush, International Channel Shanghai acquired the rights to produce a show under the Amazing Race brand, resulting in the 2010 broadcast of The Amazing Race: China Rush. The winning team of Shanghai Rush was Richard Lin and Alice Tsui Lin.

== Cast ==
Applications for the first season ended February 28, 2009. Teams race through the many districts of Shanghai while performing tasks. The host is Brian Yang. There are ten teams.

Some legs have a Final Challenge. At this point, teams' overall times are converted from minutes to seconds (i.e., if a team took 45 minutes to complete the first part of the leg, their time would be reduced to 45 seconds). Then, they would complete the Final Challenge and have the time from that challenge added to their total time. Sometimes, all teams complete the Final Challenge at the same time, but this is not always the case.

== Results ==
Team		Relationship	Position (by leg)											
Team		Relationship	1	2	3	4	5	6	7	8	9	10	11^{5}	12
Hong Kong, United States	Alice & Richard	Married	8th	3rd	8th	1st	2nd	8th^{3}				3rd^{4}	2nd	1st
United States	Anna & Hudd	Married	1st	6th	2nd	3rd	4th	3rd	1st	1st	2nd	4th	1st	2nd
United States	Liz & Nic	Friends	9th	7th	6th	6th	7th	2nd	3rd	2nd	3rd	1st	3rd	
Germany, China	Helmut & Muzi	Dating	4th	2nd	1st	2nd	6th	4th	5th	4th	1st	2nd	4th	
Spain, Australia	Justin & Matti	Classmates	5th	4th	9th			1st^{3}	2nd	3rd	4th			
China, England	AJ & Rebecca	Best Friends	7th	9th^{2}	3rd	5th	1st	5th	4th	5th				
Brazil	Fernanda & Rodrigo	Dating	3rd	1st	5th	4th	3rd	6th	6th					
United States	David & Norma	Mother/Son	10th	8th	4th	7th	5th	7th						
United States, China	Lauren & William	Friends^{1}	2nd	5th	7th	8th								
United States	Marilyn & Melanie	Roommates	6th	10th										

Key

- A red team placement indicates that the team was eliminated.
- An underlined blue team placement indicates that the team came in last on a non-elimination leg.

Notes

^1 Lauren & William did not have a pre-existing relationship before participating on Shanghai Rush. While they were auditioning, their original teammates could not make it and they decided to team up.
^2 AJ & Rebecca were disqualified from the Final Challenge as neither of them had a valid driver's license. As a result, the slowest lap time was added to their overall time.
^3 Due to a shoulder injury Alice sustained during the rest period, Alice & Richard withdrew from the competition. Due to the injury, they were allowed to select one other team to replace them through the race: Justin & Matti.
^4 Alice & Richard were allowed to be returned to the show at this point in what was dubbed a "comeback episode".
^5 Leg 11 was a double elimination leg. The last two teams to be checked in at the Finish Line were both eliminated.

== Prizes ==
The prize for each leg is awarded to the first place team for that leg.

- Leg 1 – Two M1 electric scooters from Spicy Motors
- Leg 2 – Organic food package and vouchers
- Leg 3 – Two one-year memberships to Eternity Fitness
- Leg 4 – Two Fossil watches
- Leg 5 – 50 Y+ Yoga lessons
- Leg 6 – Two skin care packages from Kanebo
- Leg 7 – Two nights in a deluxe suite at the Hilton Beijing
- Leg 8 – Two sets of luggage from UTC and two tickets to the Tennis Masters Cup
- Leg 9 – Two nights in a deluxe suite at the Wangfujing Hilton Beijing
- Leg 10 – Two vouchers for O Spa
- Leg 11 – Two skin care packages from Kanebo
- Leg 12 – A year's accommodation in two luxury villas at Gemdale Green World

== Race summary ==
=== Leg 1 (Pudong) ===
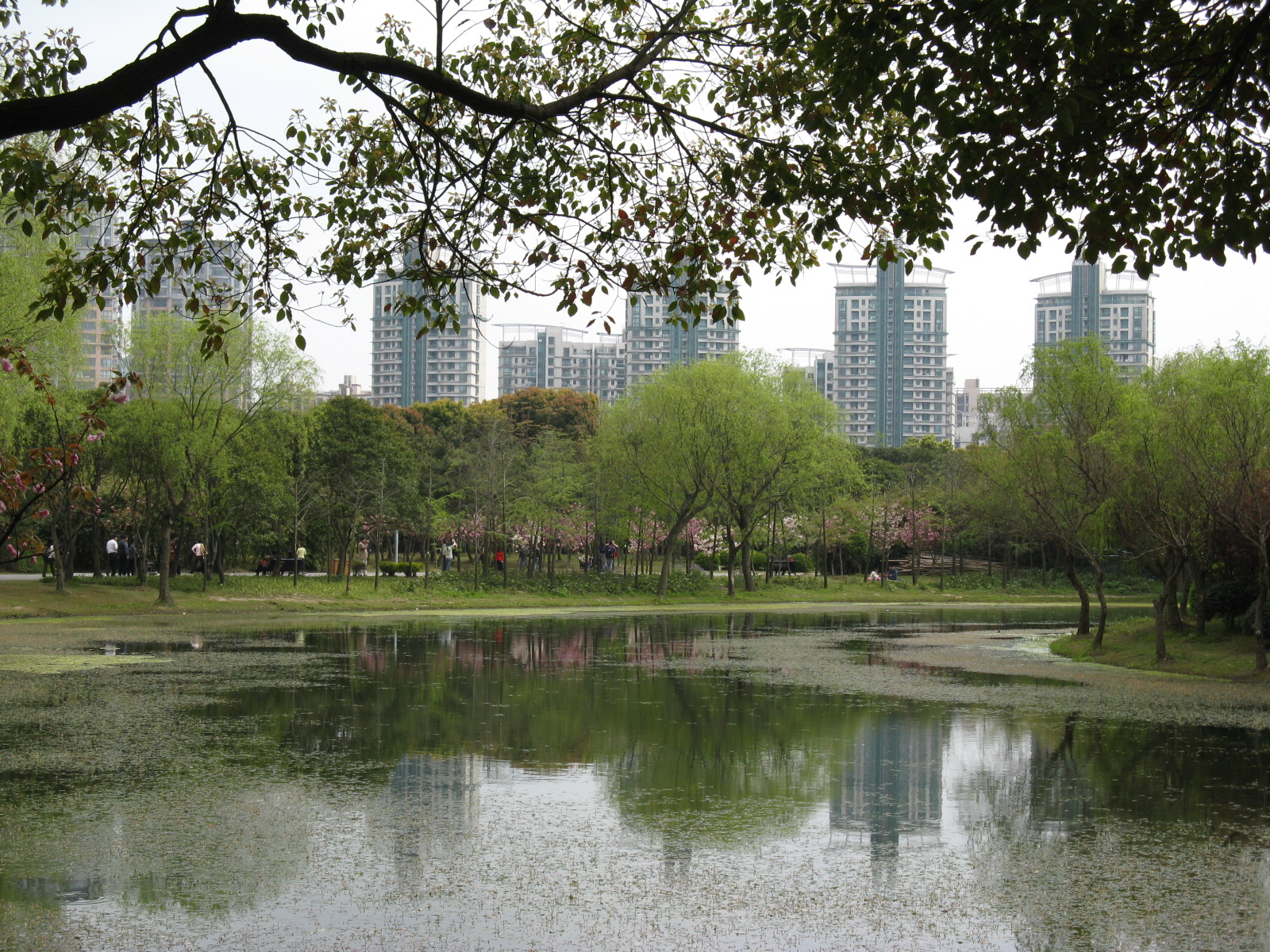
Teams finished racing in Pudong at Century Park.

- Pudong, Shanghai, China (Oriental Pearl Tower) Starting Line
- Pudong (Shanghai Science and Technology Museum)
- Pudong (China Europe International Business School)
- Pudong (Century Park)
- Pudong (Century Park – Gate 1) Finish Line

Tasks

- At the Shanghai Science and Technology Museum, teams must go head to head with a robot in a game of archery and score more points than the robot to receive their next clue from a teacher.
- At Century Park, teams must ride tandem bicycles and try to find the boat deck for their next clue.
- At the aforementioned boat deck, one team member had to ride a paddle boat and search for their next clue.

=== Leg 2 (Jiading) ===
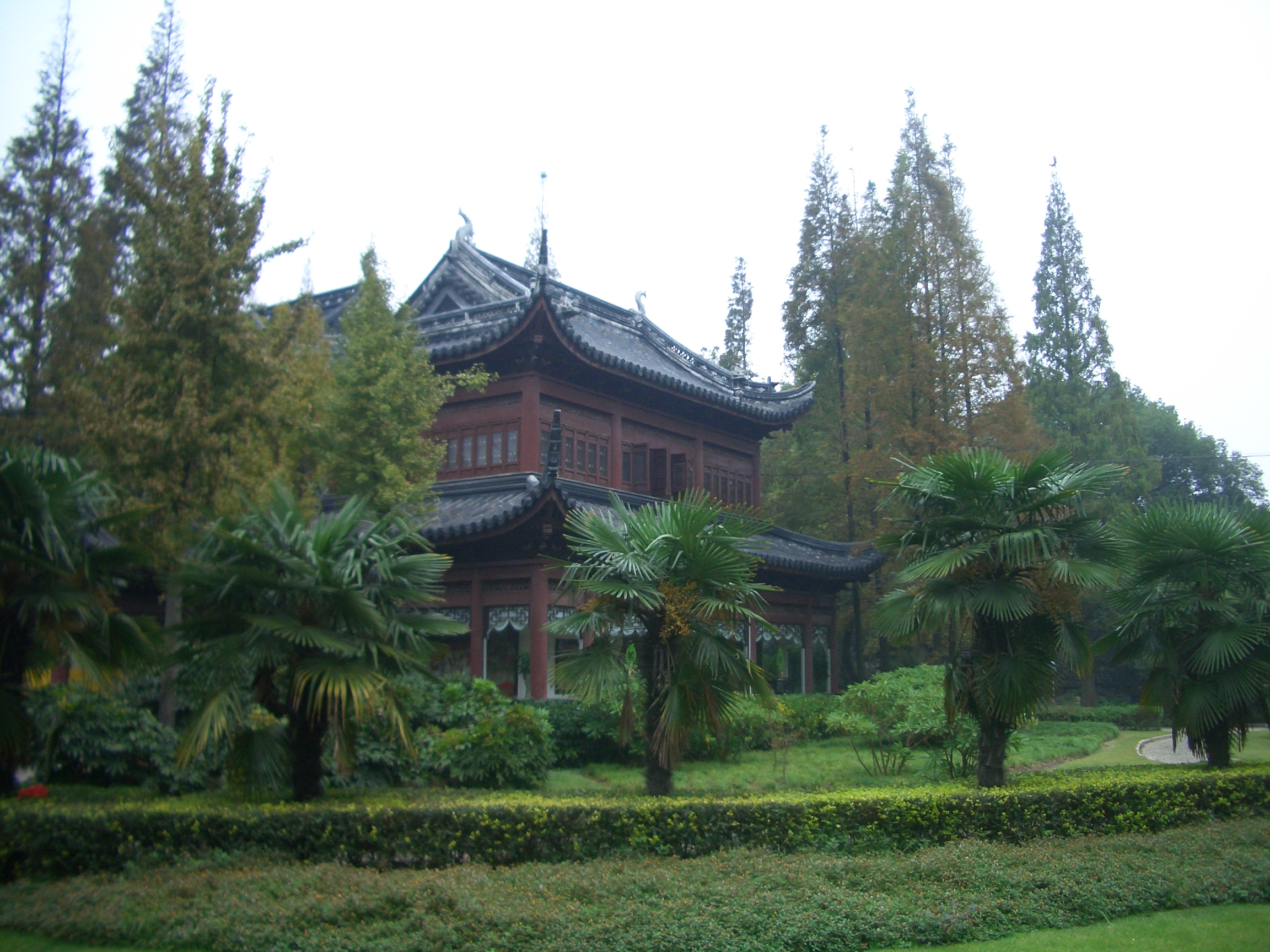
In Jiading, teams started racing from the Temple of Confucius.

- Jiading (Temple of Confucius) Starting Line
- Jiading (Hui Long Tan)
- Jiading (Fahua Pagoda)
- Jiading (Bo Le Square)
- Jiading (GuYi Garden)
- Jiading (Nanxiang Xiaolong Restaurant)
- Jiading (Gemdale Green World)
- Jiading (Shanghai International Circuit) Final Challenge; Finish Line

Tasks

- At The Dragon's Pond, teams had to search within the park for their next clue. After finding it, they had to climb up many stairs and ring the bell at the top before looking for their next location at the Fahua Pagoda
- At Bo Le Square, teams had to find some waiting taxis to take them to Guyi Garden.
- At Guyi Garden, teams had to find a tablet describing the "turtle of longevity".
- At the Nanxiang Xiaolong Restaurant, each team member had to prepare 20 Xiaolongbao, a type of steamed dumpling.
- During the Final Challenge at the Shanghai International Circuit, each team had to complete one lap around a 5.5 km course in an F1 Race Car.

=== Leg 3 (Songjiang) ===
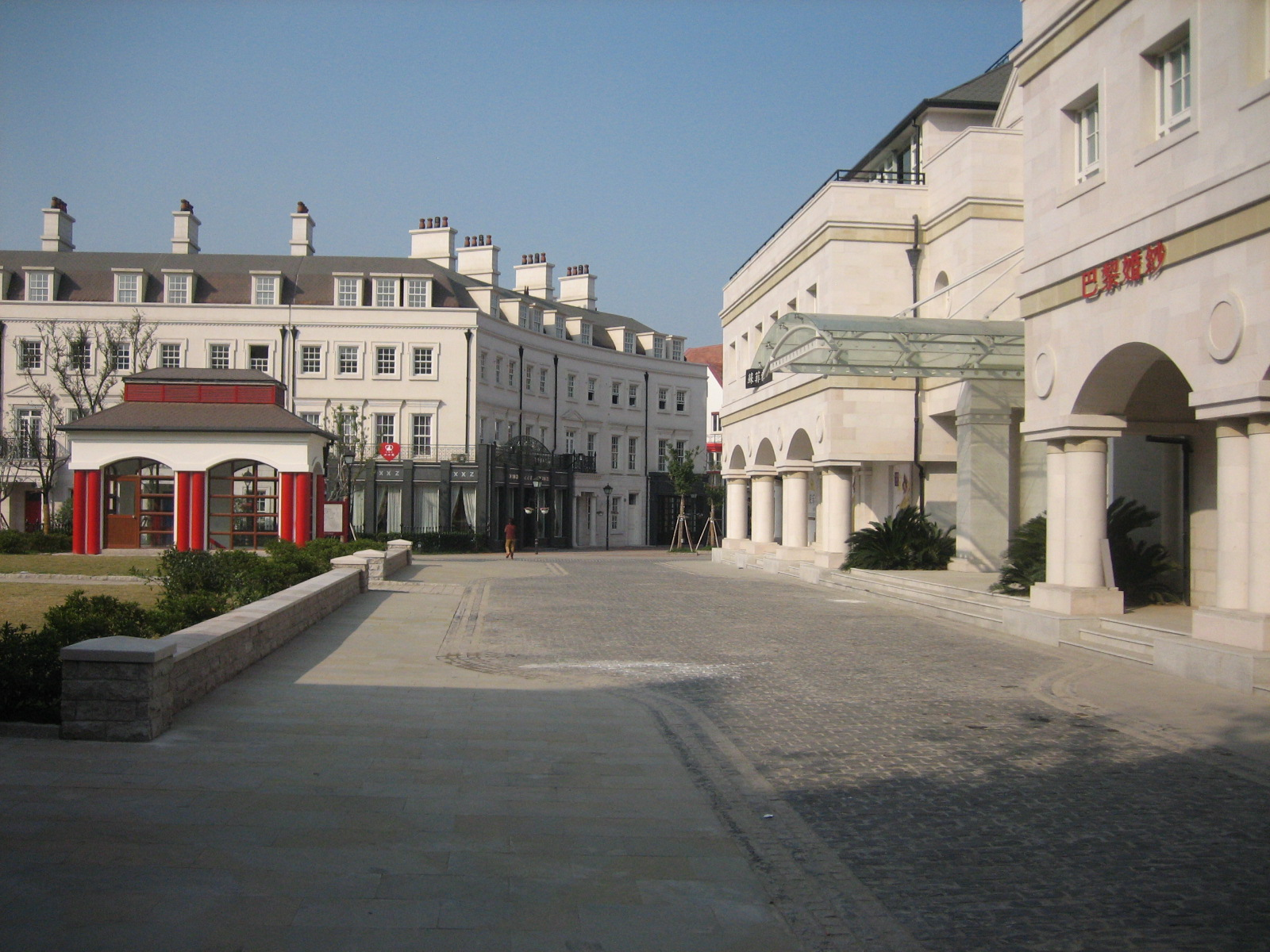
In Songjiang, teams crossed the finish line in Thames Town.

- Songjiang (Shanghai Film Studio) Starting Line
- Songjiang (She Shan Basilica)
- Songjiang (She Shan Hill)
- Songjiang (Thames Town – Eternity Fitness Boot Camp) Final Challenge; Finish Line

Tasks

- At the Film Studio, teams had to search the backlot for their next clue.
- At Sheshan Church, teams had to perform a martial arts stunt that is often used in films. They would be hoisted up in the air by a wire and would then have to plummet to the ground upside down. They would stop their descent just before reaching the ground and would then receive their next clue.
- In the Final Challenge at Thames Town, teams would enter boot camp and had to run "The gauntlet". First, they would put on fat suits and run through a course. Then, without the fat suits, they had to run through an obstacle course similar to an army training course and fight their way past the trainers to the finish line. This course included using shields to repel enemy fire, rappelling down the side of a building, and being punched by trainers using padded weapons.

=== Leg 4 (Yangpu) ===
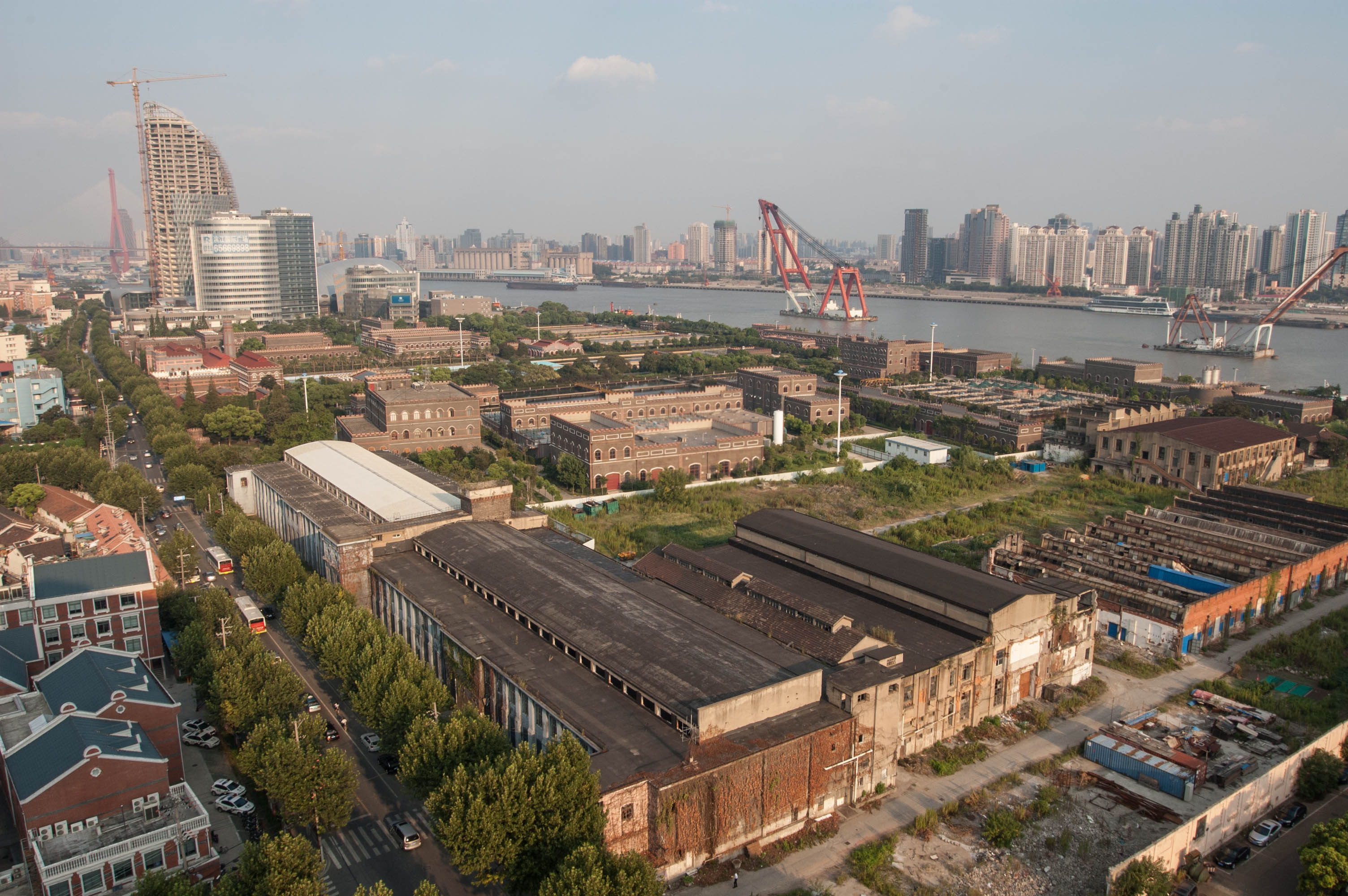
In Yangpu, teams had to search the Shanghai Waterworks Museum for a code.

- Yangpu (Jiangwan Sports Center) Starting Line
- Yangpu (Fuxing Island – Southern Bridge)
- Yangpu (Art & Culture Space at 2218 Yang Shu Pu Road)
- Yangpu (Wujiaochang)
- Yangpu (Shanghai Waterworks Science & Technology Museum)
- Yangpu (Art & Culture Space) Finish Line

Tasks

- At Jiang Wan Sports Stadium, teams had to search the many seats for their next clue.
- At Art & Culture Space, teams had to write the name of You Are the Chef in Traditional Chinese lettering.
- At Wujiaochang, teams had to complete a lap of the underground walkway.
- At the Shanghai Waterworks Museum, teams would find a 3 digit code near the underground workers exhibit (The code was written on the helmets) and had to search for briefcases that they could unlock with the keys.

=== Leg 5 (Changning) ===
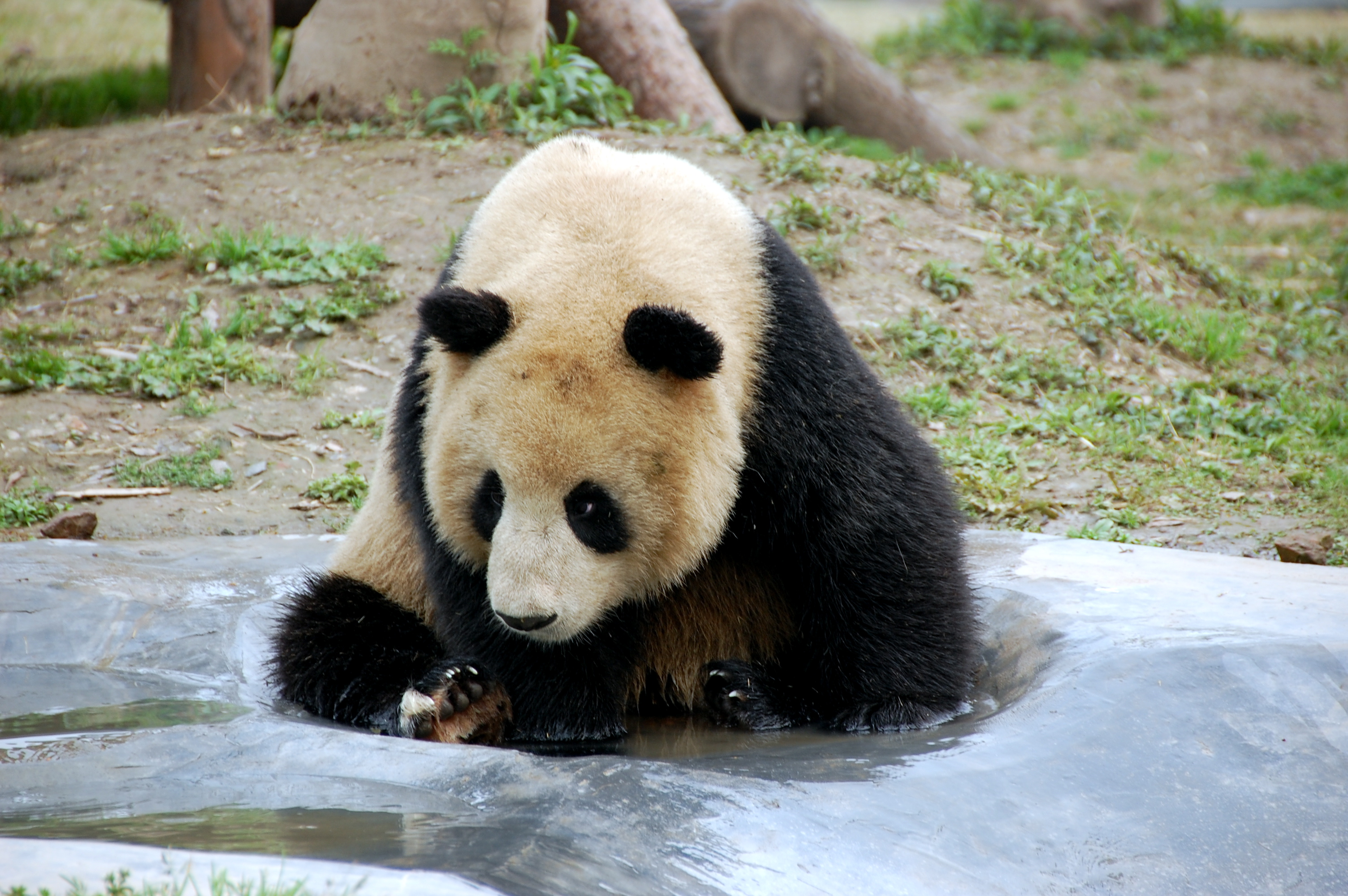
In Changning, teams traveled to the Shanghai Zoo to search for the giant panda.

- Changning (Shanghai Sculpture Space) Starting Line
- Changning (Zhongshan Park)
- Changning (Shanghai Zoo)
- Changning (Soong Ching-ling Memorial)
- Changning (Shanghai No. 3 Girls' High School)
- Changning (Multimedia Life Plaza) Finish Line

Tasks

- At the Shanghai Sculpture Space, teams had to search the sculpture gardens outside for their first clue.
- Teams had to search through Zhongshan Park to find their next clue.
- The clue found in Zhongshan Park had teams figure out where they could find Panthera tigris amoyensis, Ailuropoda melanoleuca and golden monkey. Teams had to find out that these animals could be found at the Shanghai Zoo.
- Once at the Shanghai Zoo, teams had to take a picture of the three aforementioned animals.
- At the #3 Girls' Middle School, one team member must participate in an exam. If they get 5 questions correct, they'll receive their next clue.

=== Leg 6 (Hongkou) ===
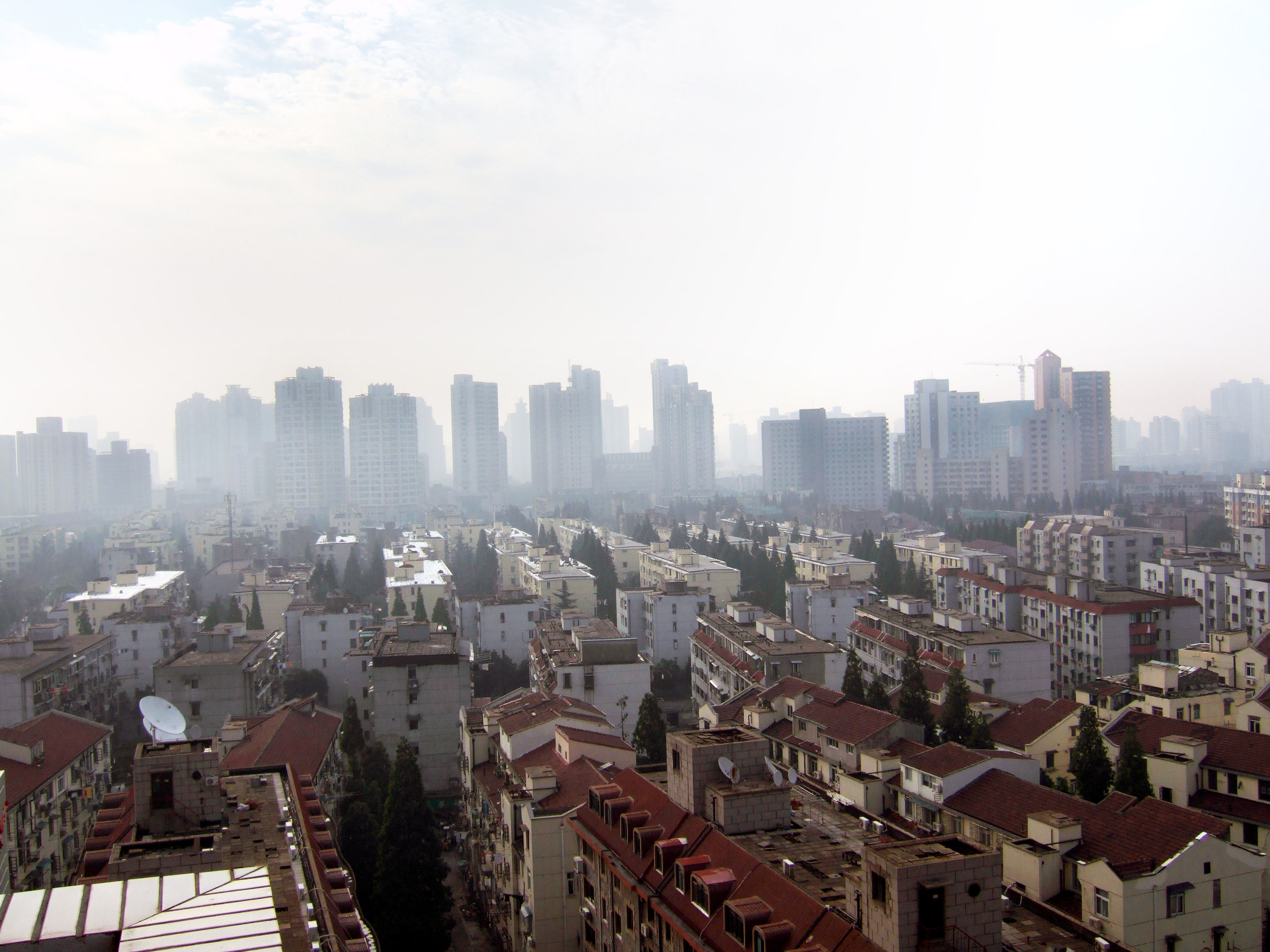
This leg of the Shanghai Rush took place in Hongkou.

- Hongkou (1933 Slaughterhouse) Starting Line
- Hongkou (Duolun Road)
- Hongkou (Shanghai Post Museum)
- Hongkou (Shanghai Jewish Refugees Museum)
- Hongkou (International Cruise Terminal) Final Challenge; Finish Line

Tasks

- In 1933, teams had to search the slaughterhouse for their next clue.
- The clue found at 1933 was a fill in the blanks exercise that led teams to Duolun Road that contained a broken passage about Lu Xun and Ding Ling. If teams could learn enough history from the people and attractions of the historic street, they could take their completed clue to an Antique Shop (appropriately enough found at the address of 1933) for their next clue.
- At the Post Museum, teams had to piece together their next address using three postcards found in the mail-sorting machine. If they got the address correct, they could exchange the three postcards to someone on the roof for their next clue (which led them to a completely different address).
- At the Jewish Refugees Museum, teams had to copy down a famous speech made by Yitzhak Rabin. Then they had to recall the address that they earlier pieced together with the postcards. This would lead them to their Final Challenge.
- In the Final Challenge at the International Cruise Terminal, one team member would be blindfolded and had to cross a giant map that was laid out on the ground. They had to make their way from New York City to Shanghai, but they could only walk along the oceans. If they touched land, they would have to start over.

=== Leg 7 (Qingpu) ===
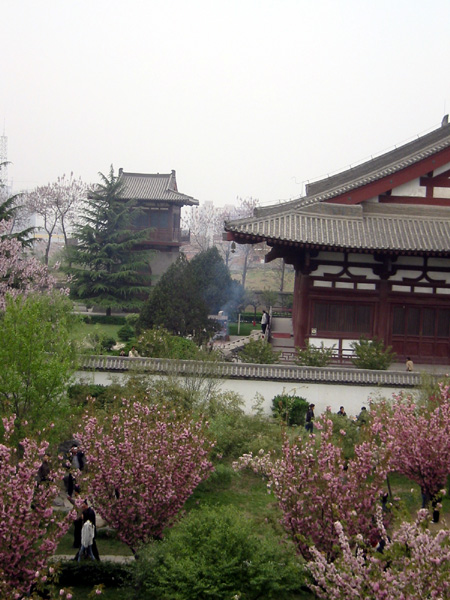
In Qingpu, teams started out at the Qinglong Temple (青龙寺).

- Qingpu (Qinglong Temple) Starting Line
- Qingpu (Qingpu Museum)
- Qingpu (Zhujiajiao – Han Da Long Restaurant)
- Qingpu (Zhujiajiao – Chenghuangmiao)
- Qingpu (Zhujiajiao – Stinky Tofu Store)
- Qingpu (Oriental Green Boat Theme Park) Finish Line

Tasks

- At Qinglong Temple, teams had to count the number of small monk statues around the temple to get their next clue. Then, before leaving for their next destination, teams had to toss a coin into the highest opening of a fountain.
- When leaving Qinglong Temple, teams found taxis provided for them. However, all of the drivers were from downtown Shanghai and had never been to Qingpu before.
- In Zhujiajiao Old Town, teams had to find a gondola dock behind the Han Da Long Restaurant. Then, they would take a gondola ride down the river to Chenghuangmiao, where they found their next clue and three-wheeled bicycles to ride to their next destination.
- At the Stinky Tofu Store, teams had to purchase and eat two orders of stinky tofu.
- At the Oriental Green Boat Theme Park, teams participated in a bean bag relay by taking turns tossing a bean bag to one another. Whoever was currently holding the bean bag could not move while the other team member had to move further down the path, but not far enough away as to be unable to catch the bean bag. Once they crossed the finish line of the relay, the leg was over. If teams dropped the bean bag, they had to start from the beginning.

=== Leg 8 (Minhang) ===
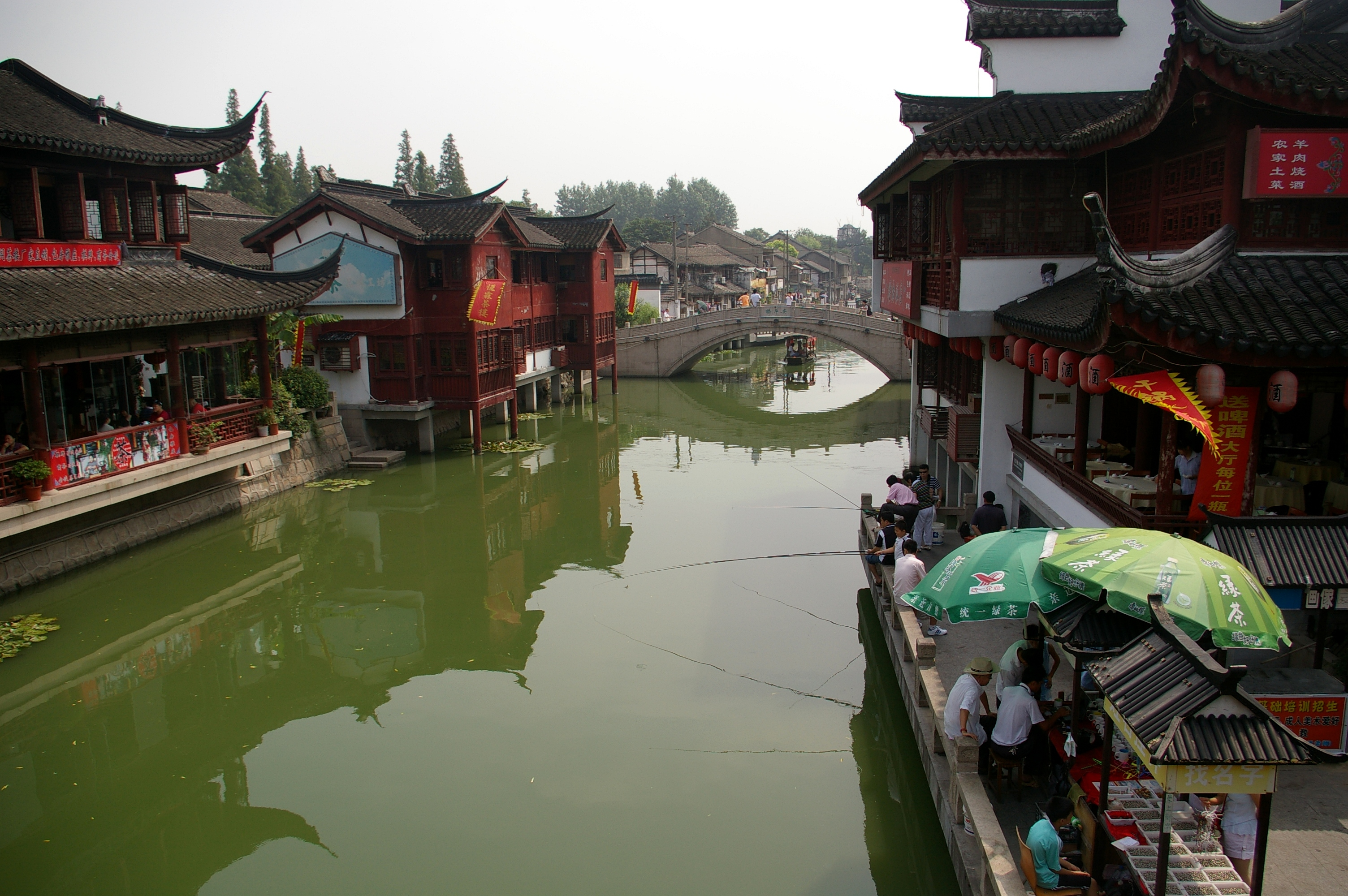
While in Minhang, teams traveled to Qibao.

- Minhang (Qi Zhong Tennis Center) Starting Line
- Minhang (Jinjiang Amusement Park)
- Minhang (Qibao – Cotton Mill)
- Minhang (Minhang Sports Park)
- Minhang (Yinqixing Indoor Ski Area) Final Challenge; Finish Line

Tasks

- At the Qi Zhong Tennis Center, which is fashioned like a stadium, one team member must hit a tennis ball from the upper level seating and the other team member must catch it while standing on the fields below. If successful, they'll get their next clue.
- At Jinjiang Amusement Park, teams were told to find and ride something "big and round". This turned out to be the ferris wheel, which measures to 108m high.
- At Qibao's Cotton Mill teams will find their next clue with 100¥ which they must use to purchase a costume (or parts to make a costume). They will then put on a show for the people of Qibao and must earn 7¥ before getting their next clue.
- At Minhang Sports Park, teams were told to find a wooden suspension bridge.
- For the Final Challenge in the Qingixing Indoor Ski Area, both team members would ski or snowboard down a hill individually. They had to ski through flags and were penalized one second for every missed flag. The time of the faster team member will be added to the overall standings while the time of the slower team member is ignored. Teams are given a certain amount of time before the challenge to practice and/or speak to a guide.

=== Leg 9 (Xuhui) ===
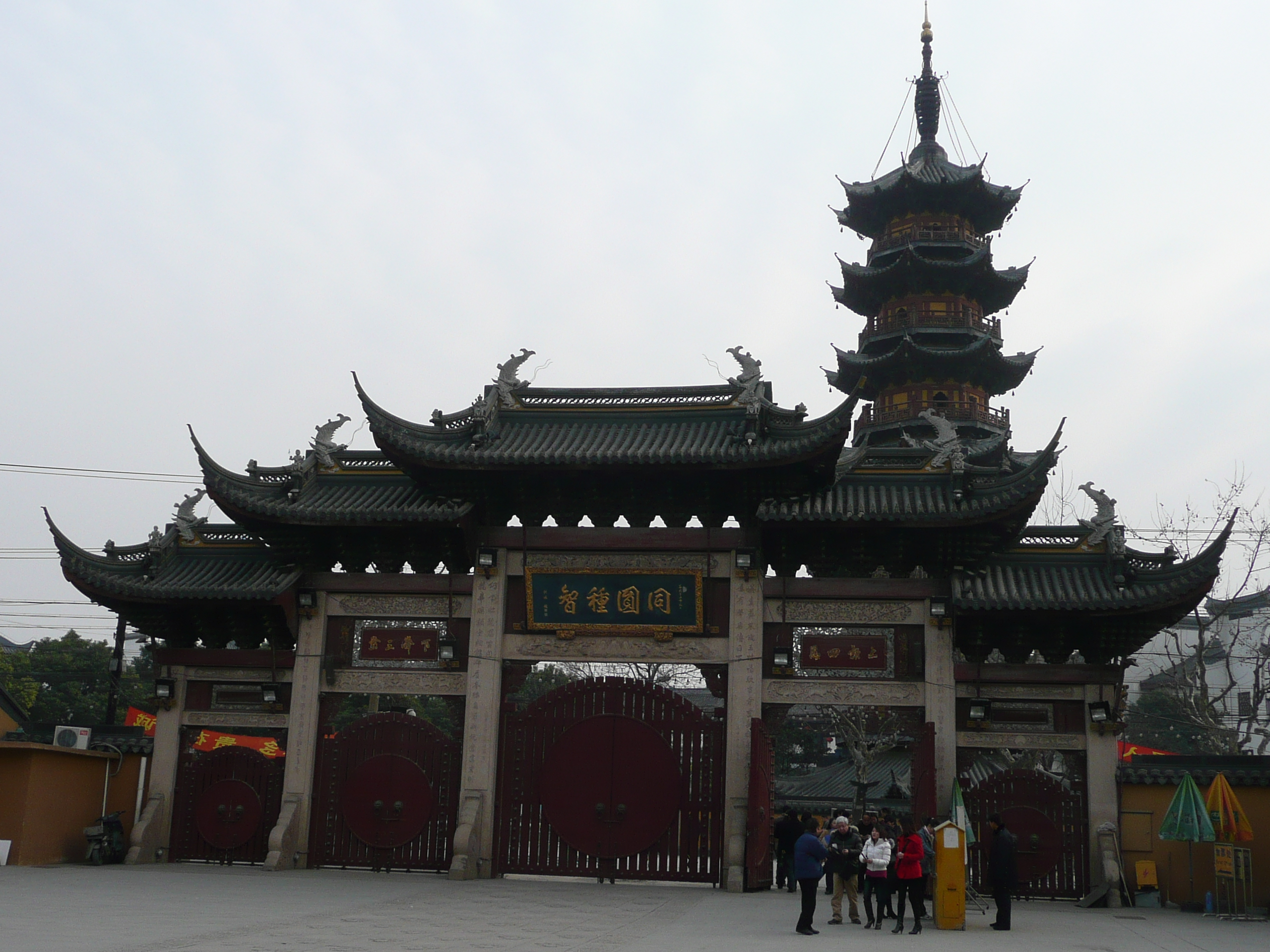
In Xuhui, teams traveled to the Longhua Temple.

- Xuhui (Shanghai Jiao Tong University)
- Xuhui (Xu Guangqi Park)
- Xuhui (Shanghai Peking Opera House)
- Xuhui (Xujiahui Park)
- Xuhui (Longhua Temple)
- Xuhui (Shanghai Stadium) Final Challenge; Finish Line

Tasks

- At Jiaotong University, teams had to search the entire campus for one of four clues hidden at the very corners.
- At the Shanghai Peking Opera House, each team member will be taught one monologue and one pose. They must perform these to a panel of judges. If they are successful, they'll receive their next clue.
- At Xujiahui Park, teams had to find clues hanging from trees.
- In the Final Challenge at Shanghai Stadium, teams had to climb a rock wall to reach their final clue. The time of the faster team member will be added to the overall standings while the time of the slower team member is ignored.

=== Leg 10 (Luwan) ===
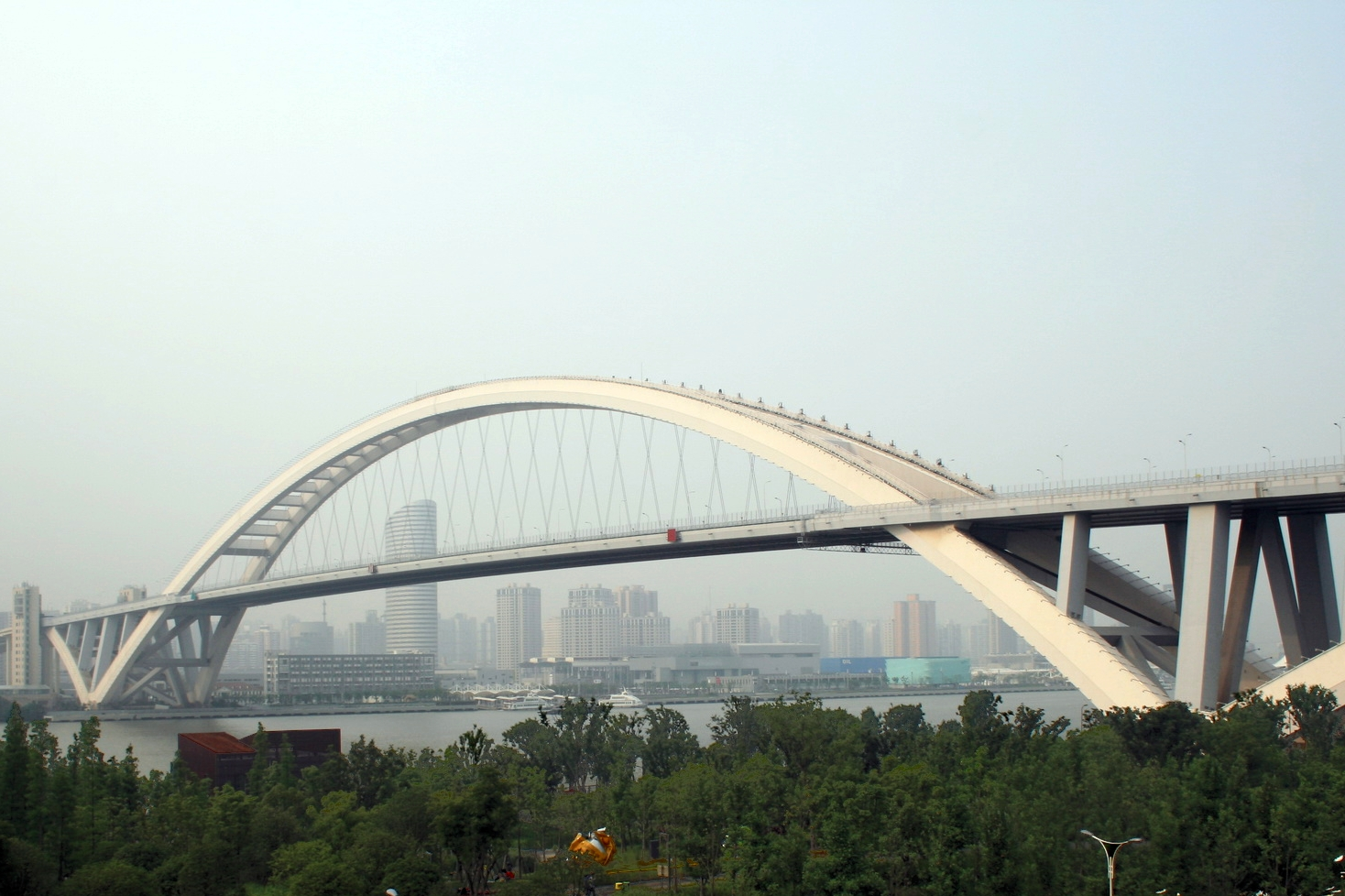
In Luwan, teams had to climb the Lupu Bridge to find their next clue.

- Luwan (Xintiandi)
- Luwan (Lanes behind Taikang Road)
- Luwan (Dongtai Road)
- Luwan (Lupu Bridge)
- Luwan (Cité Bourgogne)
- Luwan (Taiping Lake) Final Challenge; Finish Line

Tasks

- At Xintiandi, teams had to search the grounds for their next clue.
- At Dongtai Road, teams had to show off their bargaining skills. First, they had to buy anything for 20¥ or less. Then, they had to sell that same item for more than 20¥. They would then get their next clue.
- At the Lupu Bridge, teams had to climb to the top to find their next clue.
- At Cité Bourgogne, team members had to take turns rolling a bicycle rim a certain distance without letting it fall over to gain their next clue. There are checkpoints along the way, but team members must switch at the check point.
- In the Final Challenge at Taiping Lake, teams had to bike around the lake while going as slow as possible. The longer it took them to complete the course, the more time would be deducted from their overall time. However, if a team member's feet touched the ground, their race would end there. However, the other team member could continue. When one team member crossed the finish line or both team members' feet touched the ground, the clock was stopped.

=== Leg 11 (Huangpu) ===
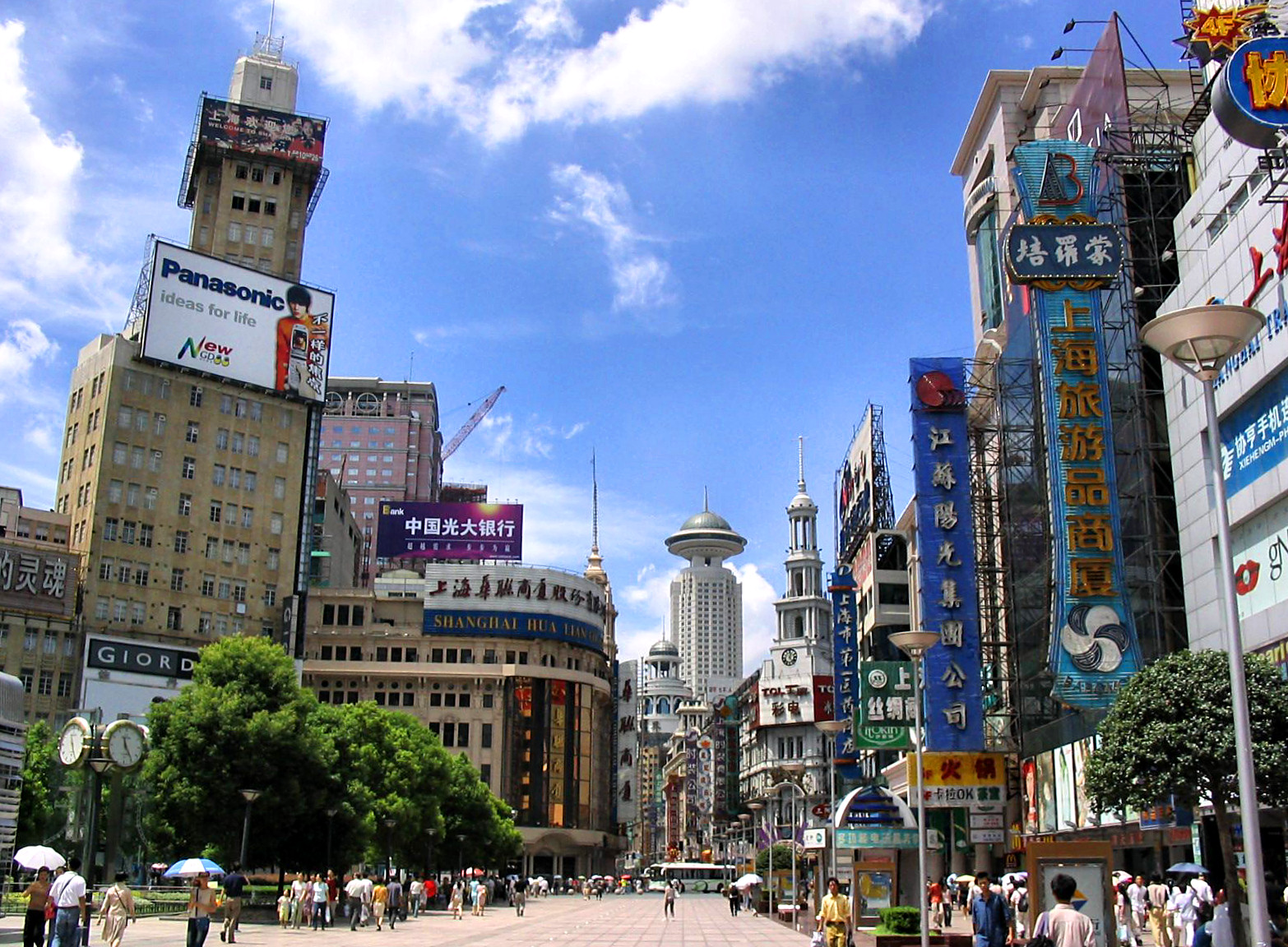
In Huangpu, teams traveled along Nanjing Road.

- Huangpu (Bund 18) Starting Line
- Huangpu (Bund Promenade)
- Huangpu (Shanghai Expo Park)
- Huangpu (Nanjing Road)
- Huangpu (Bund 6 – Cabaret)
- Huangpu (Nanxiang Steamed Bun Restaurant)
- Huangpu (Shanghai South Bund Fabric Market)
- Huangpu (Shanghai Grand Theatre) Final Challenge
- Huangpu (Dongmen Ferry Terminal) Finish Line

Tasks

- At the Bund Promenade, each team picked a kite and had to fly it all the way to the large clock structure in Shanghai Expo Park. If any part of the kite touched the ground, teams could not take another step until it was airborne again.
- At Nanjing Road, teams used cameras obtained at the Expo Park and had to take pictures of 10 different pedestrians. Each pedestrian had to be from a different country, and people from Mainland China were eligible, as long as they did not live in Shanghai.
- At Cabaret, teams had to make a Shanghai Dragon, which is made from Scotch whisky, Grand Marnier, lemon juice and sugar.
- At the Nanxiang Steamed Bun Restaurant, one team member had to eat 32 servings of Xiaolongbao.
- At the South Bund Fabric Market, teams received 300¥ and had to use that money to buy a new outfit for each team member.
- In the Final Challenge at the Shanghai Grand Theatre, teams needed to put on a performance. They would be judged and given a score out of 30: 10 points for their overall performance, 10 points for singing skills and 10 points for the costume they previously bought. If teams score less than 30, then the difference is added to their overall time in minutes (i.e., if a team scores 25 points, 5 minutes will be added).

=== Leg 12 (Pudong) ===
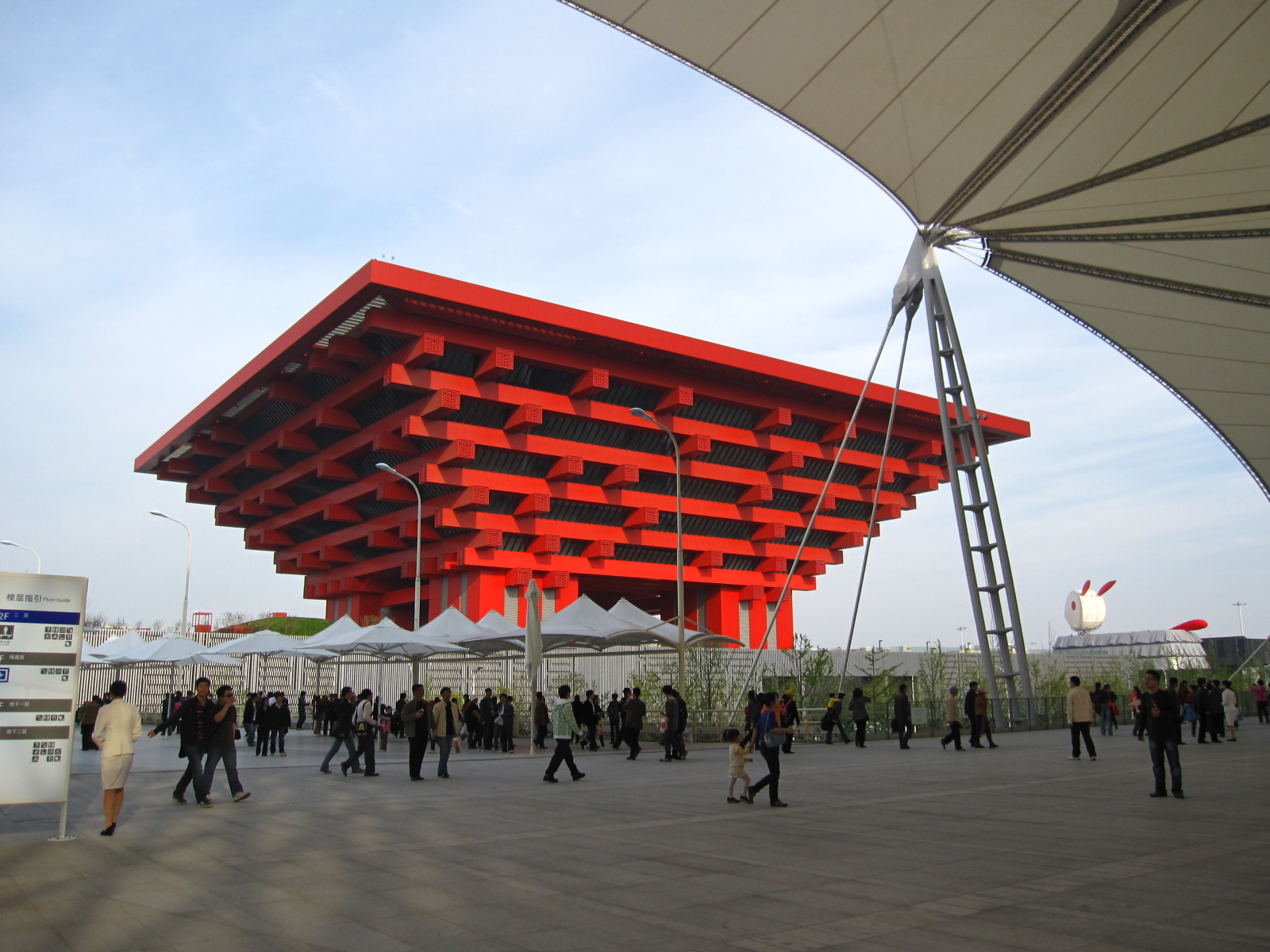
The final finish line was located near the China Pavilion at Shanghai Expo Park in Pudong.

- Pudong (Shanghai World Financial Center) Starting Line
- Pudong (Shanghai Ocean Aquarium)
- Pudong (Qingci Yangdian Daoist Temple)
- Pudong (Wet Market)
- Pudong (Shanghai Natural Wild-Insect Kingdom)
- Pudong (Pudong International Airport)
- Pudong (Shanghai Expo Park – China Pavilion) Finish Line

Tasks

- At the Shanghai World Financial Center, teams had to search the 100th floor observatory for their next clue. Then, they had to use binoculars to find a picture of a fish and an arrow at the top of the HSBC building.
- At Shanghai Ocean Aquarium, teams needed to search for two parts of the address of their next destination hidden inside the tanks.
- At the Wet Market, one team member had to use a three-wheeled bicycle to transport a load of watermelons around a marked course. If any watermelons fell out, the team member would have to put it back in before continuing. The other team member would be riding along with the watermelons.
- At the Natural Wild-Insect Kingdom, the clue teams receive tells them to travel to Pudong International Airport at 430 km/h, meaning that they had to take the Shanghai maglev train.
- At the Pudong International Airport, teams needed to scour the terminal, find 50 empty luggage carts and stack them together. These luggage carts were not placed by the production. Instead, teams were looking for actual unattended luggage carts that were previously used by travellers.
