= Soup dumpling =

Soup dumpling may refer to:

- A dumpling served in soup, such as:
  - any type of jiaozi, a Chinese dumpling, when served in soup
  - Wonton, a light Chinese dumpling usually served in soup
- Dumpling served with liquid filling, such as:
  - Tang bao, a large Chinese-styled steamed unleavened bun filled with soup
  - Xiaolongbao, a small Chinese-styled steamed bun, the unleavened version can be filled with broth
  - Buuz, a Mongolian steamed bun with a filling, can be filled with broth
  - Khinkali, a Georgian dumpling with a filling, traditionally of minced meat and broth
