= Nanxiang Steamed Bun Restaurant =

Restaurant in Shanghai, China

- 南翔馒头店
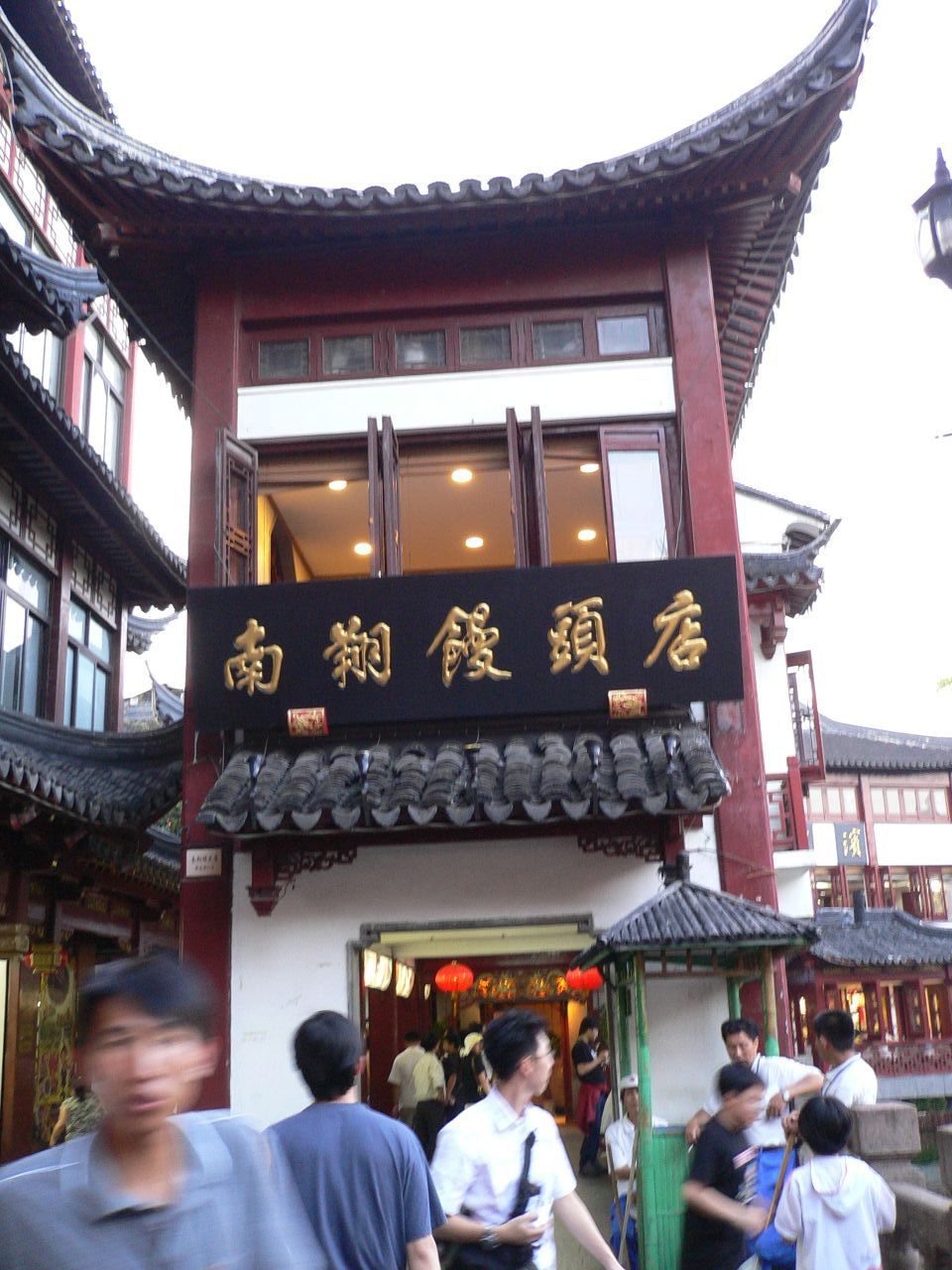
- The Restaurant at Yuyuan Garden, Shanghai

- Location within China

General information
- Location: Huangpu, China, Shanghai
- Coordinates: 31.2276°N 121.4877°E
- Construction started: 1900

Nanxiang Bun Shop (simplified Chinese: 南翔馒头店; traditional Chinese: 南翔饅頭店; pinyin: Nánxiáng Mántóu Diàn; Shanghainese: Noezhian Moedeu Ti) is a traditional Shanghai eatery located in the City God Temple precinct in the old Chinese section of the city. It was established in 1900. Nanxiang is a town near Shanghai where the xiaolong mantou was invented. The restaurant has more recently expanded internationally, with branches in South Korea and Japan.

== History ==
Established in 1900, the store traces its origins to Nanxiang, Jiading District of Shanghai. Its main restaurant is now located in the City God Temple area of Shanghai. After 1949, the restaurant was confiscated by the Communist government of China, and remains owned by a government-owned company.

== Reception ==
In his 2007 book No Reservations: Around the World on an Empty Stomach, Anthony Bourdain spoke highly of the restaurant's soup-filled buns, writing that "any three-star Michelin would be proud to serve a dish this good, this beautifully crafted, and this widely admired."

== See also ==
- Baozi
- Din Tai Fung
- Shanghainese cuisine
