= Wenlou tang bao =

Huaiyang dish

Wenlou tang bao (simplified Chinese: 文楼汤包; traditional Chinese: 文樓湯包; pinyin: Wénlóu tāng bāo) is a large tangbao (baozi with soup filling) served in Wenlou, Huai'an, Jiangsu, China. The local residents also call it crab roe tangbao. It is a dish in Huaiyang cuisine.

== Brief introduction ==
Wenlou tang bao originated during the reign of the Daoguang Emperor in the Qing dynasty. It has three well-known features. First, it is very big and its wrapper is extremely thin and looks like paper. Second, the stuffing is mixed with many materials such as meat, chicken, crab roe, and shrimp. Third, it is the unique process. The soup stuffing should be solidified, put into the wrapper and steamed finally.
