= Guyi Garden =

Classical garden in Shanghai, China

Coordinates: 31.2919977°N 121.3165676°E

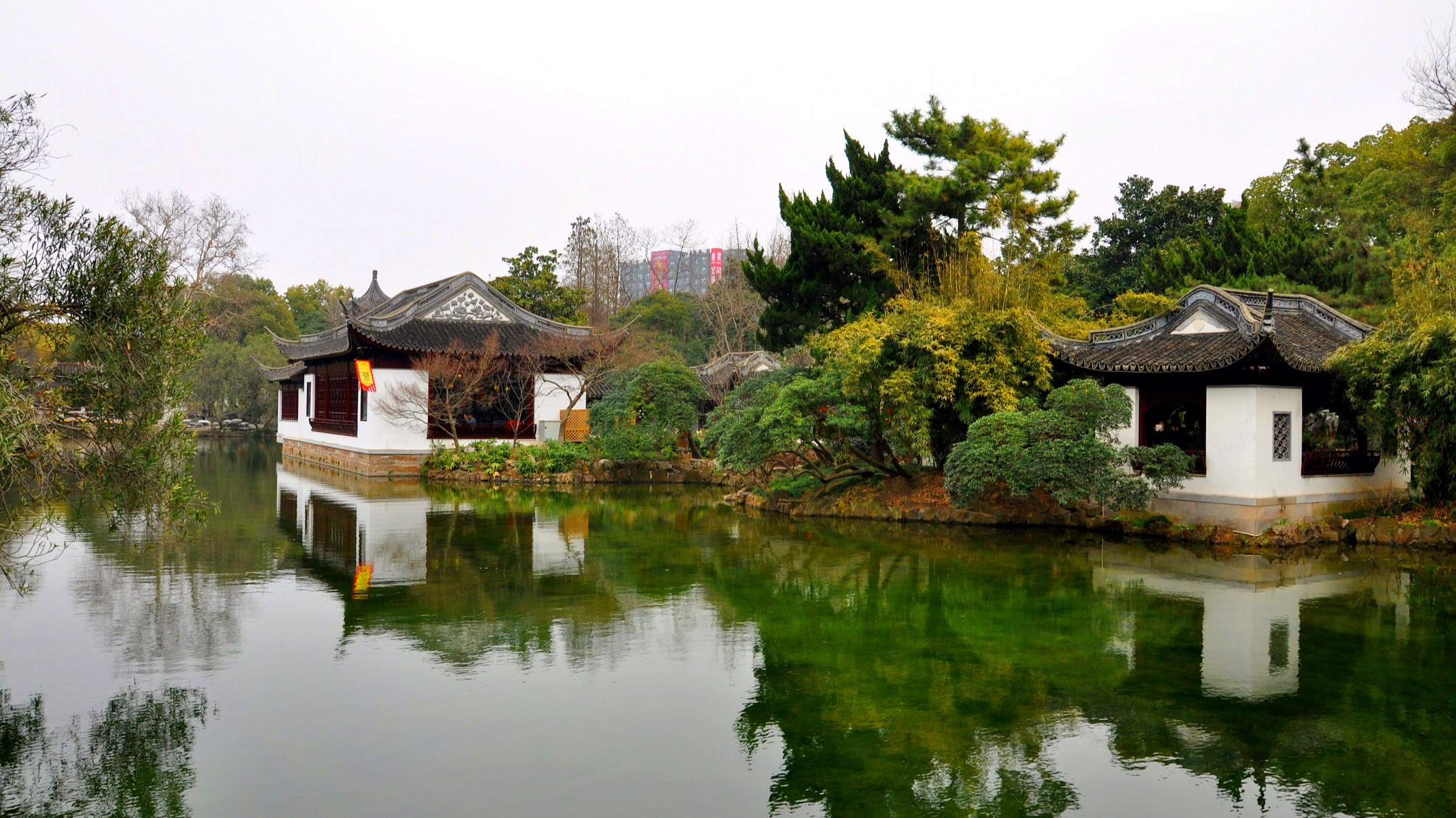
Guyi Garden, a classical Chinese garden in a suburb of Shanghai.

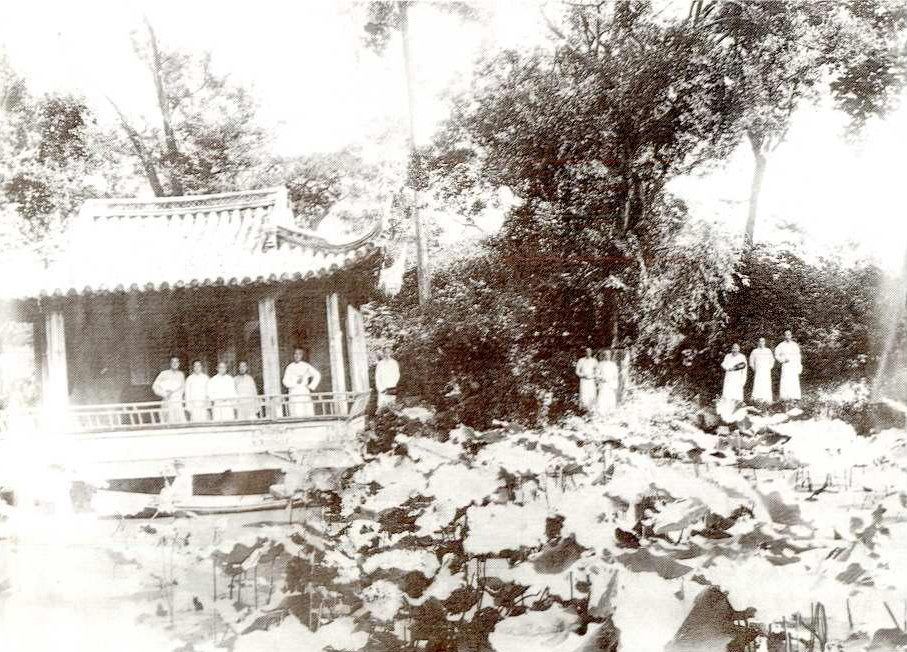
Some Chinese artists visiting Guyi Garden in 1915

Guyi Garden (Chinese: 古猗园; pinyin: Gǔyī Yuán) is a classical Chinese garden in the town of Nanxiang in the suburban Jiading District of Shanghai, China. The garden is located about 21 kilometres (13 mi) from the city centre. Designed in the typical style of a Jiangnan classical garden, Guyi Garden is regarded as one of the five most important classical gardens of Shanghai.

== History ==
The garden was originally owned by magistrate Min Shiji during the Jiajing era (1522–1566) of the Ming dynasty. After passing through various private hands, it was extensively re-modelled in 1746, during the Qianlong era of the Qing dynasty. In 1789, the local gentry pooled funds and purchased the garden to serve as the spiritual home of the patron deity of the prefecture, associated with the local City God Temple. The garden then become communal property, and saw the addition of various pavilions and shrines, as well as the opening of shops, taverns and restaurants.

== Description ==
The layout of the garden trees and rocks are from the famous Zhuyu Song Jiang set bamboo hands. Take "Book of Songs," "green bamboo Yi Yi," the sentence, naming "Yi Park."

Guyi Goose Pond Park in order to play as the center, west of the crane built in Ming dynasty pavilion to the north stone boat, also known as the Department of boat does not. Plum east hall, its architecture and Hall Flower Street have adopted plum blossom design around the kinds of full of plum. Lotus poolbuilt in the Song dynasty Pu Dong Thap, carvings. South Hall and the Pavilion before the microphone, each with a stone Jing Zhuang, more than years of history. Marble Boat Club after the other side is a floating-jun mountain bamboo. Park with green bamboo planted as a feature of the park are wild Yi Tang, kite flying diving Hin, small Songgang, Xiaoyun pocket, play goose pond, clouds Court, Songhe Park, Qing-Qing Yuan, Yuanyang Lake, Nanxiang wall, Zigzag Bridge, Plum Hall, pavilion, Bamboo and other King own special characteristics. There Tang Jing Zhuang, Song dynasty stone pagodas and other artifacts.

== See also ==
- List of Chinese gardens
