= Nanxiang =

Nanxiang 南翔镇
- Town
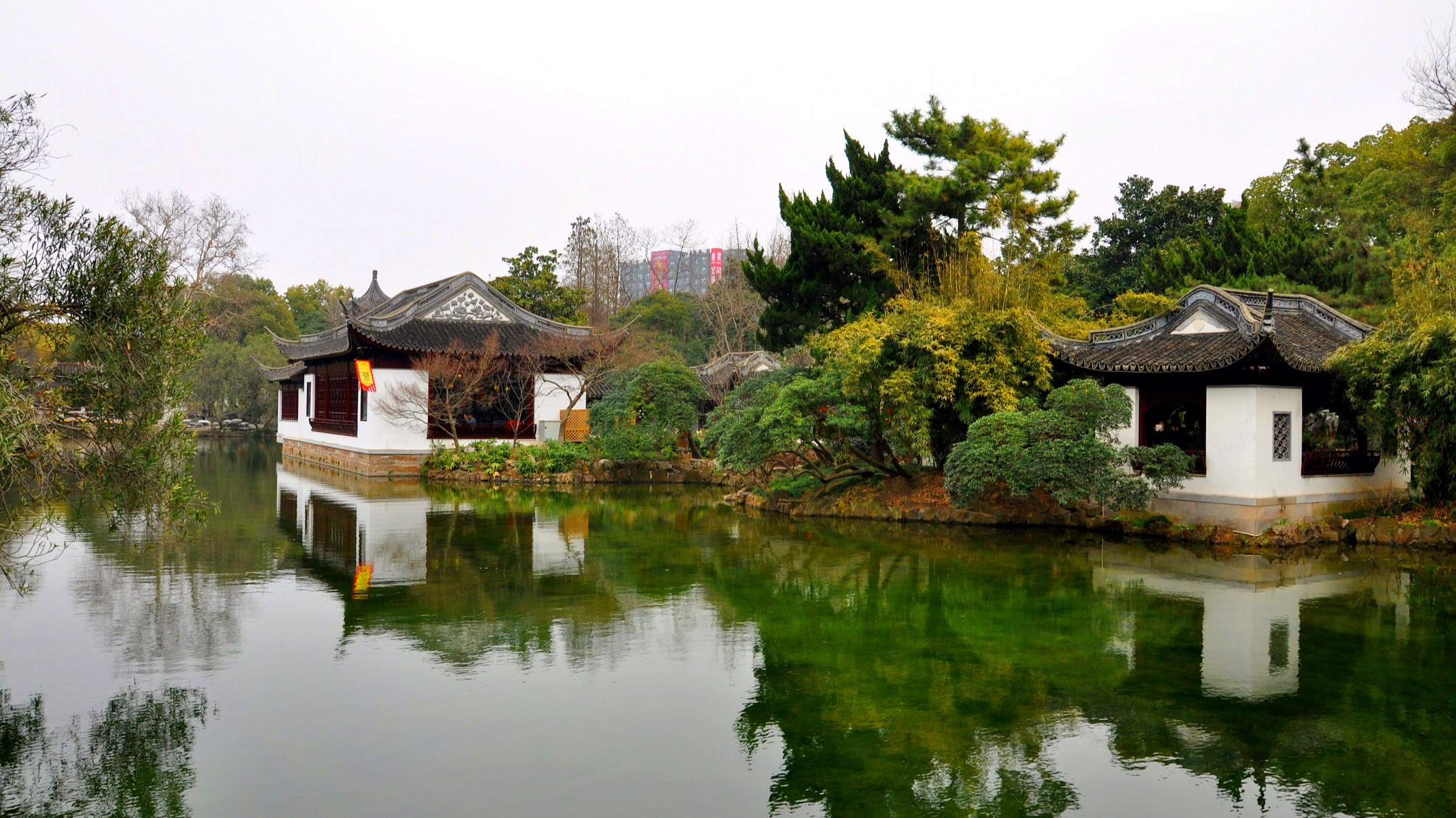
- Guyi Garden

- Location in Shanghai
- Coordinates: 31.2937°N 121.3210°E
- Country: People's Republic of China
- Municipality: Shanghai
- District: Jiading
- Time zone: UTC+8 (China Standard)

Nanxiang (Chinese: 南翔; pinyin: Nánxiáng) is a town in the Jiading District of Shanghai.

== Sights ==
The town is home to Guyi Garden, a large Ming dynasty Suzhou-style park. One of the biggest temples in Shanghai, Yun Xiang Si (云翔禅寺), is located in the middle of the town, attracting a large number of tourists from all around the world.

== Food ==
Nanxiang is home to the original Nanxiang Xiaolongbao (Nanxiang xiaolong mantou) that eventually became known as Shanghai-style xiaolongbao. Nanxiang Bun Shop is well known across China.

The dish was also made more widely known after featuring in the film Leaving Me, Loving You, which was set in Shanghai and starred the Hong Kong pop singers Leon Lai and Faye Wong.

== Transportation ==
It is connected to downtown Shanghai by the Hujia Expressway (coded A12 in the Shanghai expressway system; A12 is now S5), which was the first expressway in China. It is about 18 kilometres (11 mi) away from downtown.

The Nanxiang station on Line 11 of the Shanghai Metro is located to the northeast of the old town.

== See also ==
- List of township-level divisions of Shanghai
