= Tangbao =

Large soup-filled variety of steamed buns

Tang bao
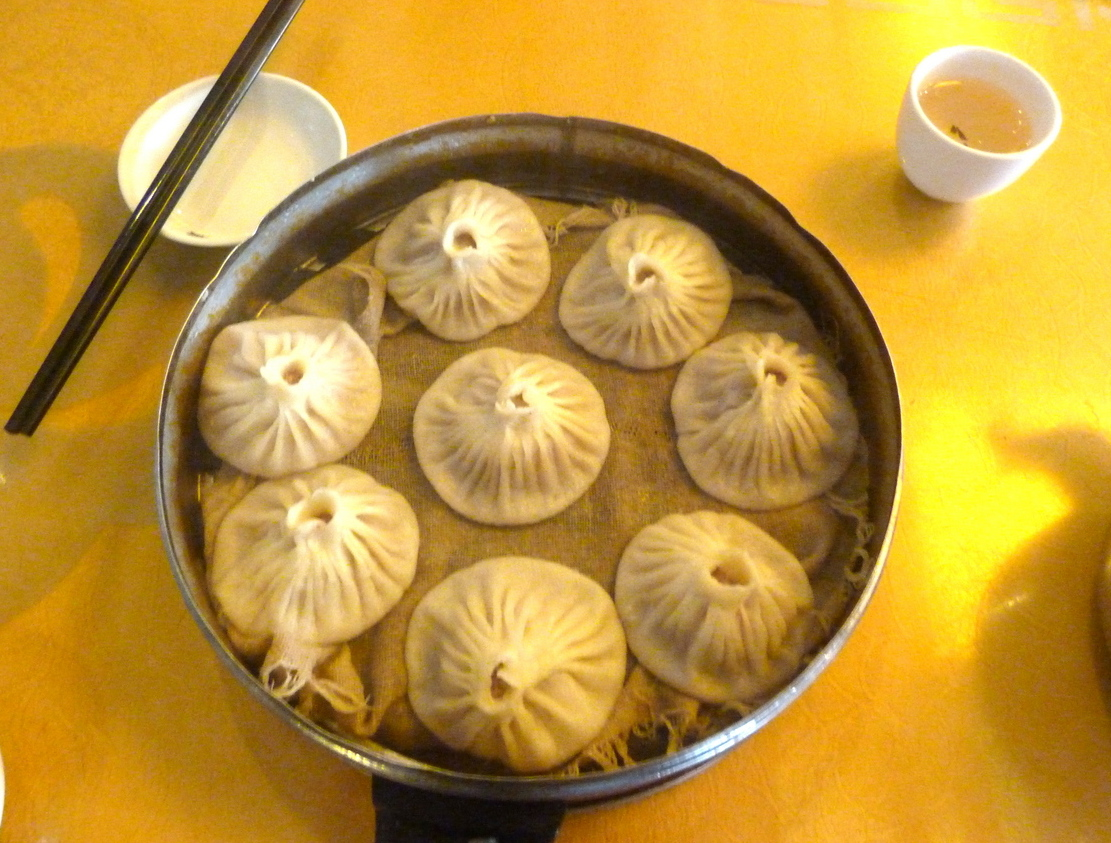
- Type: Baozi
- Place of origin: China
- Region or state: Various

Tangbao
- Simplified Chinese: 汤包
- Traditional Chinese: 湯包
- Literal meaning: "soup bun"
Transcriptions
Standard Mandarin
- Hanyu Pinyin: tāngbāo
Yue: Cantonese
- Jyutping: tong^{1}-baau^{1}

Guantangbao
- Simplified Chinese: 灌汤包
- Traditional Chinese: 灌湯包
- Literal meaning: "soup-filled bun"
Transcriptions
Standard Mandarin
- Hanyu Pinyin: guàntāngbāo

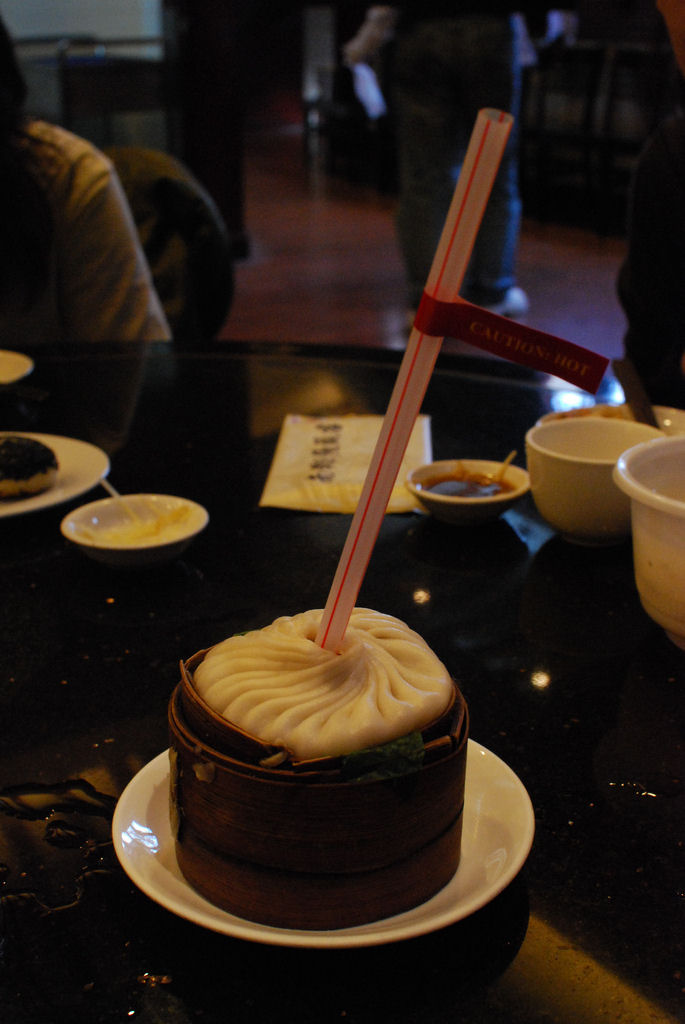
A crab-roe tang bao of the Jiangsu style

Tangbao or soup buns are large, soup-filled steamed buns (baozi) in Chinese cuisine. They are also sometimes known as guantang bao or soup-filled buns. Various varieties are found, with some name variations in various parts of the country. All of these buns are made by wrapping a gelatinous filling in dough, which is then steamed to melt the filling into soup. Tangbao first appeared in the capital city of the Song dynasty, Bianjing, now Kaifeng, Henan. It spread to the Yangtze River delta following the Jingkang Incident.

== Types ==
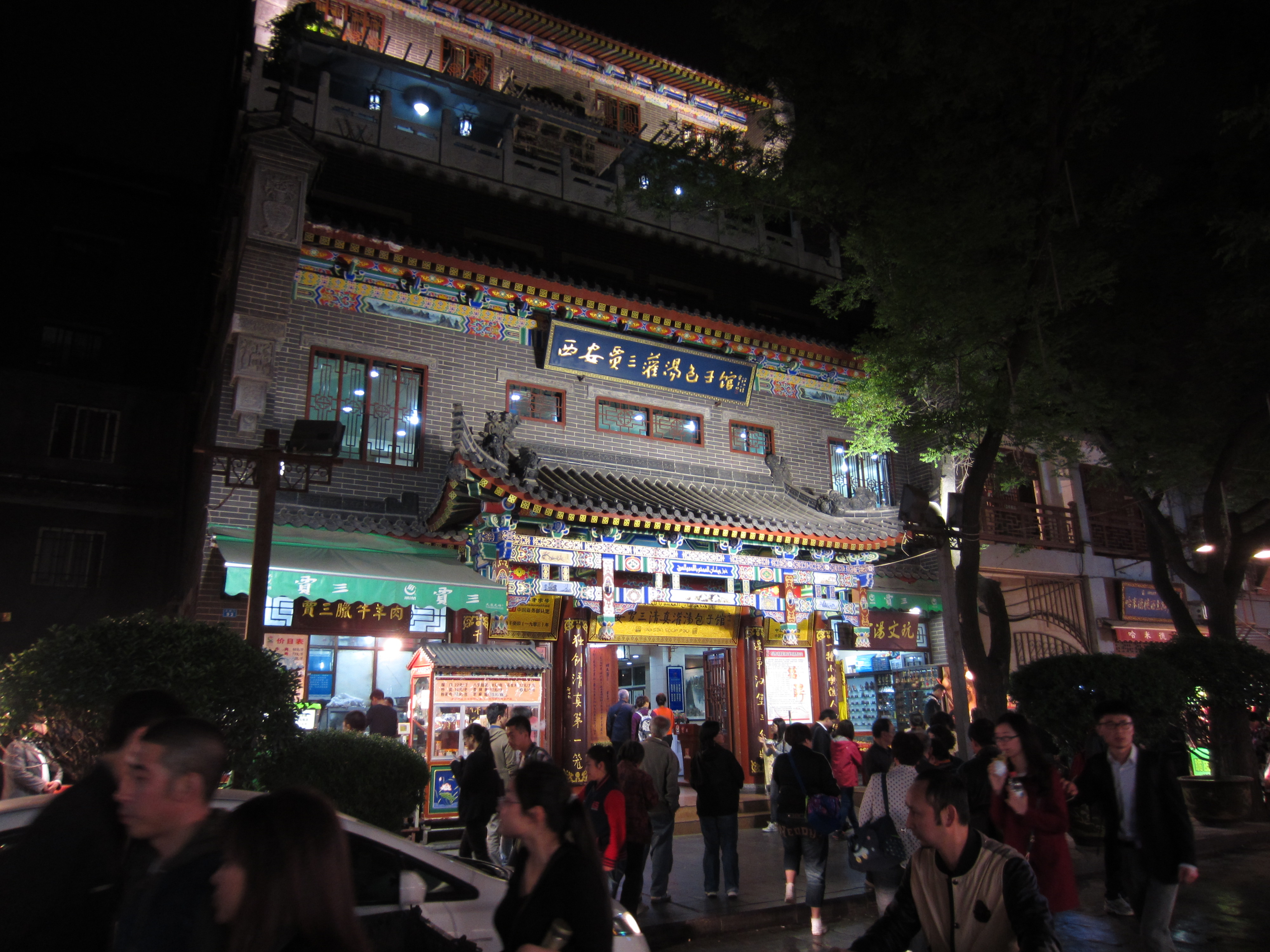
Halal tangbao in Xi'an's Hui quarter

Some examples of tangbao include:

- Tangbao from Kaifeng, in Henan province: The traditional tang bao in Kaifeng is a large bun, similar to other baozi, which is bitten open to release the soup filling, which is then drunk with a spoon. However, the traditional form has all but disappeared, with most eateries choosing to serve a Jiangsu-style tangbao where the soup is drunk with a straw.
- Tangbao from Xi'an, Shaanxi: In the city's Hui quarter, halal tangbao are part of the local Muslim food tradition. Jia San's version uses Qinchuan beef or lamb, with broth made from beef and lamb bones.
- Tangbao from Yangzhou, Jingjiang and elsewhere in Jiangsu province: This variety is found throughout the Jiangnan region. Often served in its own individual steaming basket, the large steamed bun contains a soup filling made with pork gelatin and sometimes crab roe. The soup is drunk with a straw, and the rest of the bun is eaten afterwards. It is often served with ginger slices and vinegar.
- Xiaolongbao from Shanghai and elsewhere in Jiangsu province: A small variety of tangbao usually made with unleavened dough; each bun is picked up and bitten open to access the pork and soup filling.
- Xiaolong tangbao from Wuhan: Similar to a xiaolongbao in shape, but made with leavened dough.

== See also ==
- Wonton
- Wenlou Tang bao
- List of steamed foods
- Khinkali
