= Xiaolongbao =

Type of Chinese steamed bun

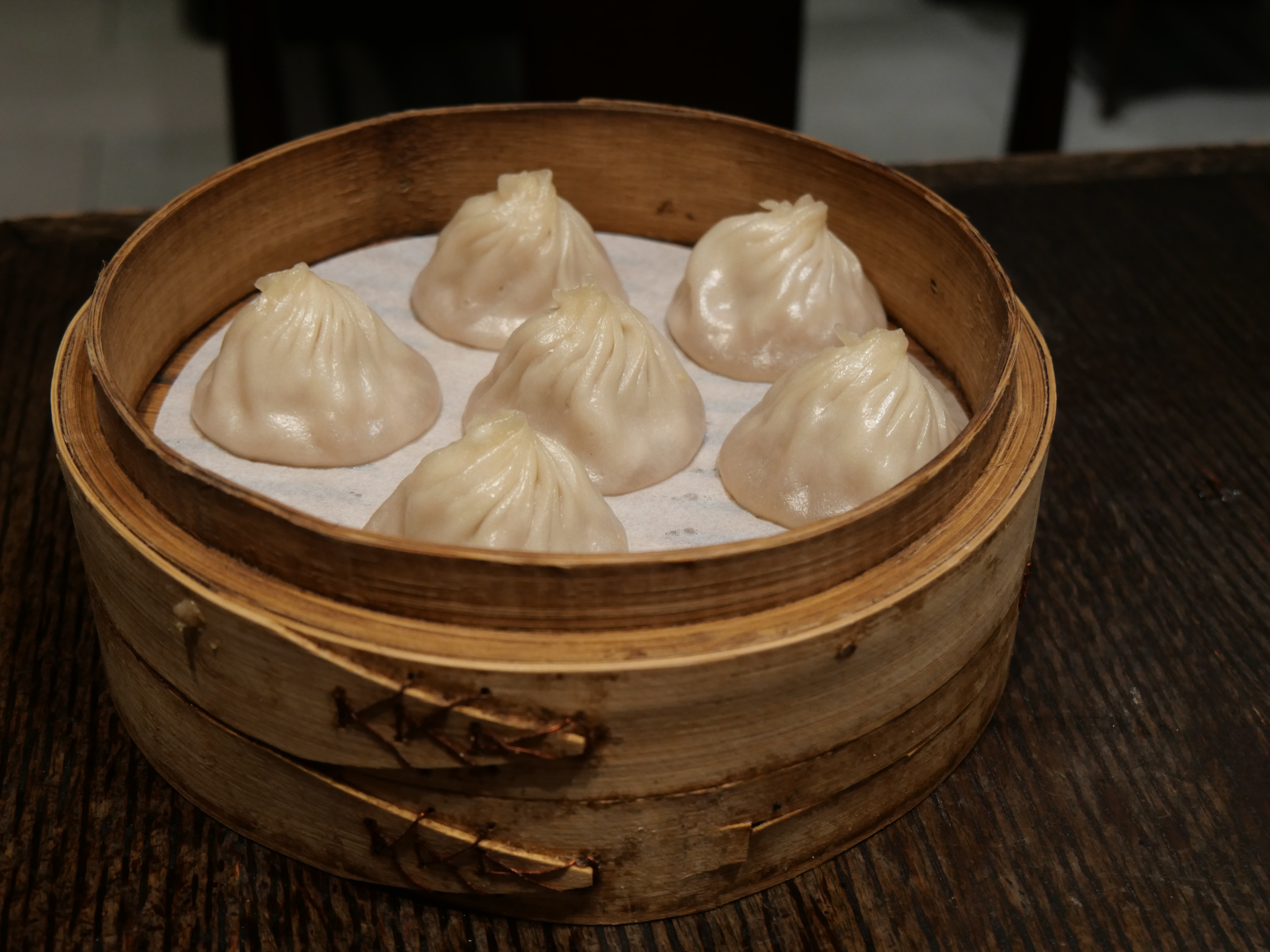
- Xiaolongbao in a bamboo steamer.
- Alternative names: xiao long bao, xiaolong mantou, XLB
- Type: Baozi; Dim sum
- Course: Breakfast, xiaochi
- Place of origin: China
- Region or state: Shanghai
- Main ingredients: Flour dough, minced pork or other meats, lard, gelatin

Chinese name
- Simplified Chinese: 小笼包
- Traditional Chinese: 小籠包
- Literal meaning: little-basket bun
Transcriptions
Standard Mandarin
- Hanyu Pinyin: xiǎolóngbāo
- Bopomofo: ㄒㄧㄠˇ ㄌㄨㄥˊ ㄅㄠ
- Gwoyeu Romatzyh: sheaulongbau
- Wade–Giles: hsiao^{3}-lung^{2}-pao^{1}
- Tongyong Pinyin: siǎo-lóng-bao
- IPA: [ɕiàʊ.lʊ̌ŋ.paʊ]
Yue: Cantonese
- Jyutping: siu2 lung4 baau1
- IPA: [siw˧˥ lʊŋ˩ paw˥]
Southern Min
- Hokkien POJ: siò-làng-pau

Wu Chinese name
- Simplified Chinese: 小笼馒头
- Traditional Chinese: 小籠饅頭
- Literal meaning: little-basket mantou
Transcriptions
Standard Mandarin
- Hanyu Pinyin: xiǎolóng mántou
- Bopomofo: ㄒㄧㄠˇ ㄌㄨㄥˊ ㄇㄢˊ ˙ㄊㄡ
- Gwoyeu Romatzyh: sheaulong man.tour
- Wade–Giles: hsiao^{3}-lung^{2} man^{2}-t‘ou
- Tongyong Pinyin: siǎo-lóng mán-to̊u
- IPA: [ɕjàʊ.lʊ̌ŋ mǎn.tʰoʊ]
Wu
- Romanization: shiau^{5} lon^{6} moe^{6} deu^{6}
Yue: Cantonese
- Jyutping: siu2 lung4 maan4 tau4; siu2 lung4 maan6 tau4
- IPA: [siw˧˥ lʊŋ˩ man˩ tʰɐw˩]; [siw˧˥ lʊŋ˩ man˨ tʰɐw˩]

Korean name
- Hangul: 샤오룽바오
Transcriptions
- Revised Romanization: syaolungbao

Japanese name
- Kanji: 小籠包
- Hiragana: しょうろんぽう
- Katakana: ショウロンポウ
Transcriptions
- Revised Hepburn: shōronpō
- Kunrei-shiki: syouronpou

Xiaolongbao (simplified Chinese: 小笼包; traditional Chinese: 小籠包; lit. 'little basket bun'; IPA: /ˈʃaʊlɒŋˌbaʊ/) is a type of Chinese tangbao (汤包; 湯包), traditionally prepared in a xiaolong, a small bamboo steaming basket. Xiaolongbao is generally believed to have originated in Shanghai.

Different cities across the Jiangnan region have varying styles of xiaolongbao. Outside of China, the Nanxiang xiaolongbao associated with Shanghai is the most common. In the Shanghainese language, they are known as siaulon moedeu or xiaolong mantou, as Wu Chinese-speaking peoples use the traditional definition of mantou, which refers to both filled and unfilled buns. The Suzhou and Wuxi styles are larger (sometimes twice as large as a Nanxiang xiaolongbao) and have sweeter fillings. The Nanjing style is smaller with an almost translucent skin and less meat.

In English, the xiaolongbao are often referred to as "soup dumplings", but "soup dumpling" in Chinese may translate to the broader culinary category known as tangbao, which includes the xiaolongbao and other related dishes, such as the Kaifeng tangbao.

== Origins ==
Modern xiaolongbao originated Shanghai. It evolved from the guantangbao (soup-filled dumplings/buns) of Kaifeng, Henan province, which was the capital city of the Northern Song Dynasty (960–1127).

Shanghai-style xiaolongbao originated in Nanxiang, which was a neighboring village of Shanghai in Jiangsu that eventually became an outer suburb of Shanghai's Jiading District. From there xiaolongbao became popular in downtown Shanghai and promptly spread outward.

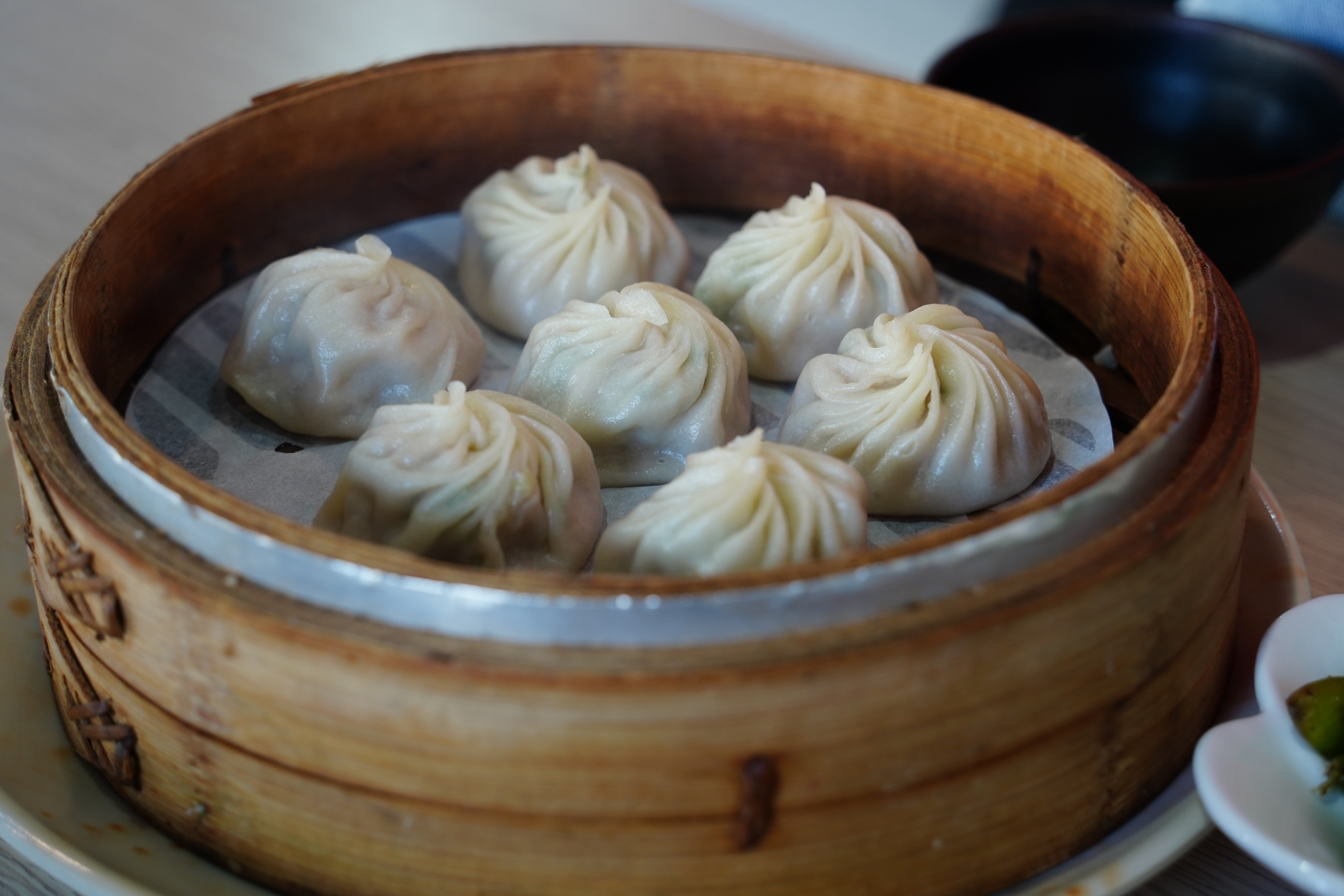
Xiaolongbao in Taiwan

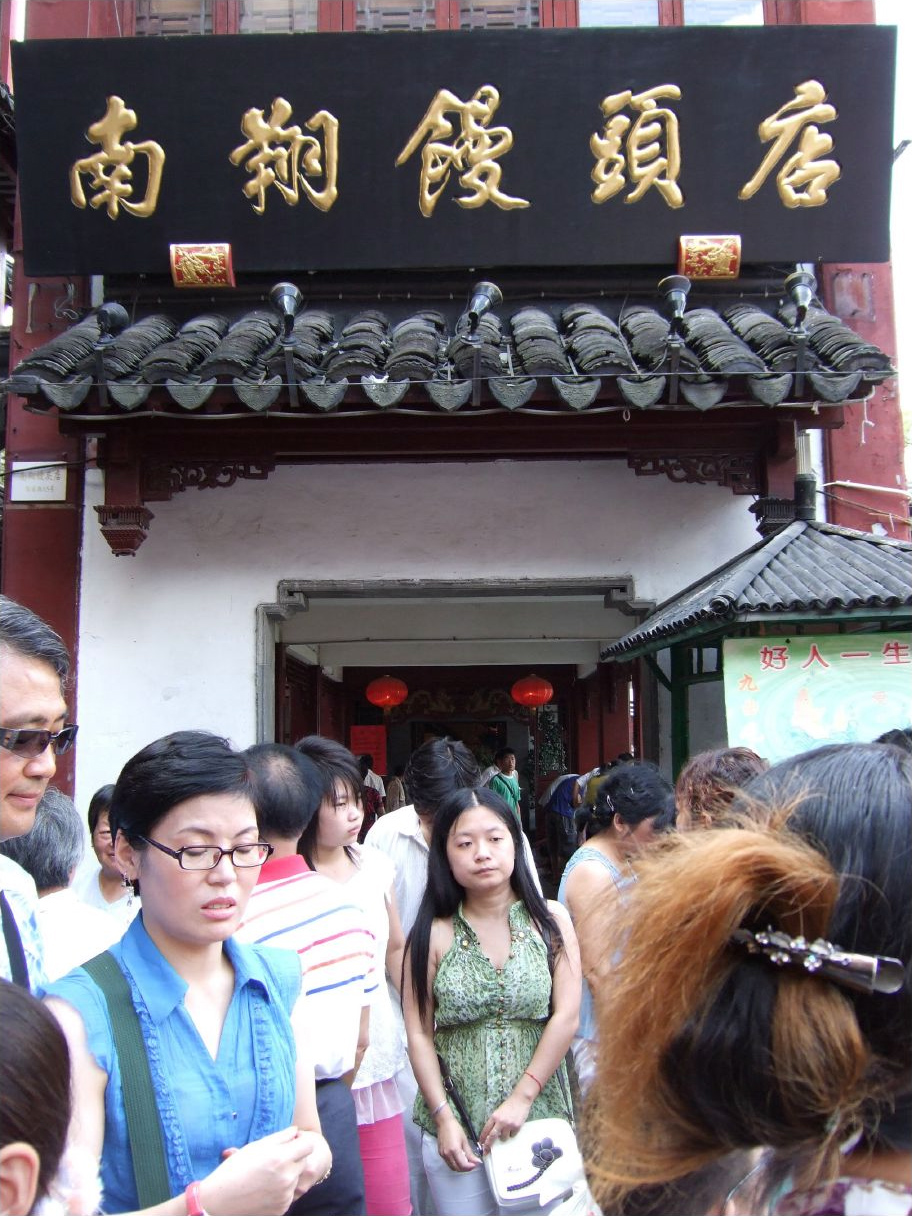
The queue outside Nanxiang Bun Shop in Shanghai

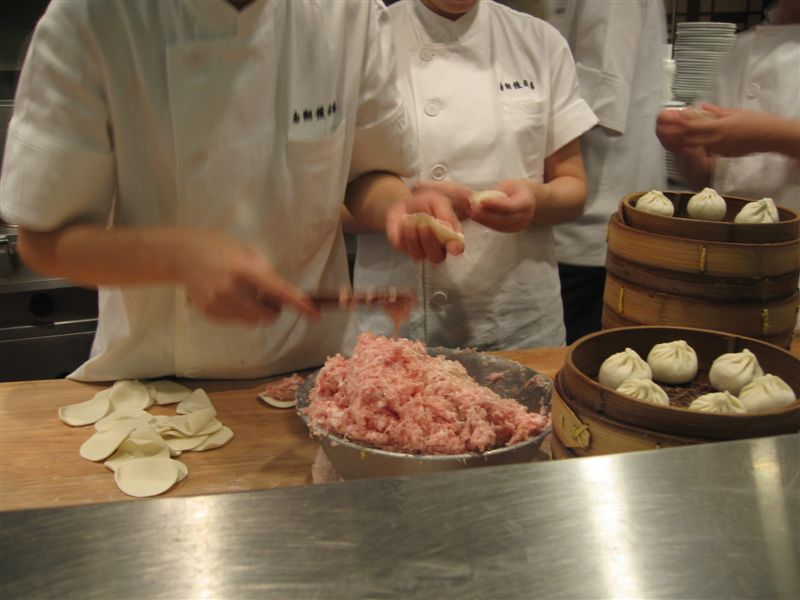
Making xiaolongbao at Nanxiang Mantou Dian store in Roppongi Hills, Japan

== Ingredients ==
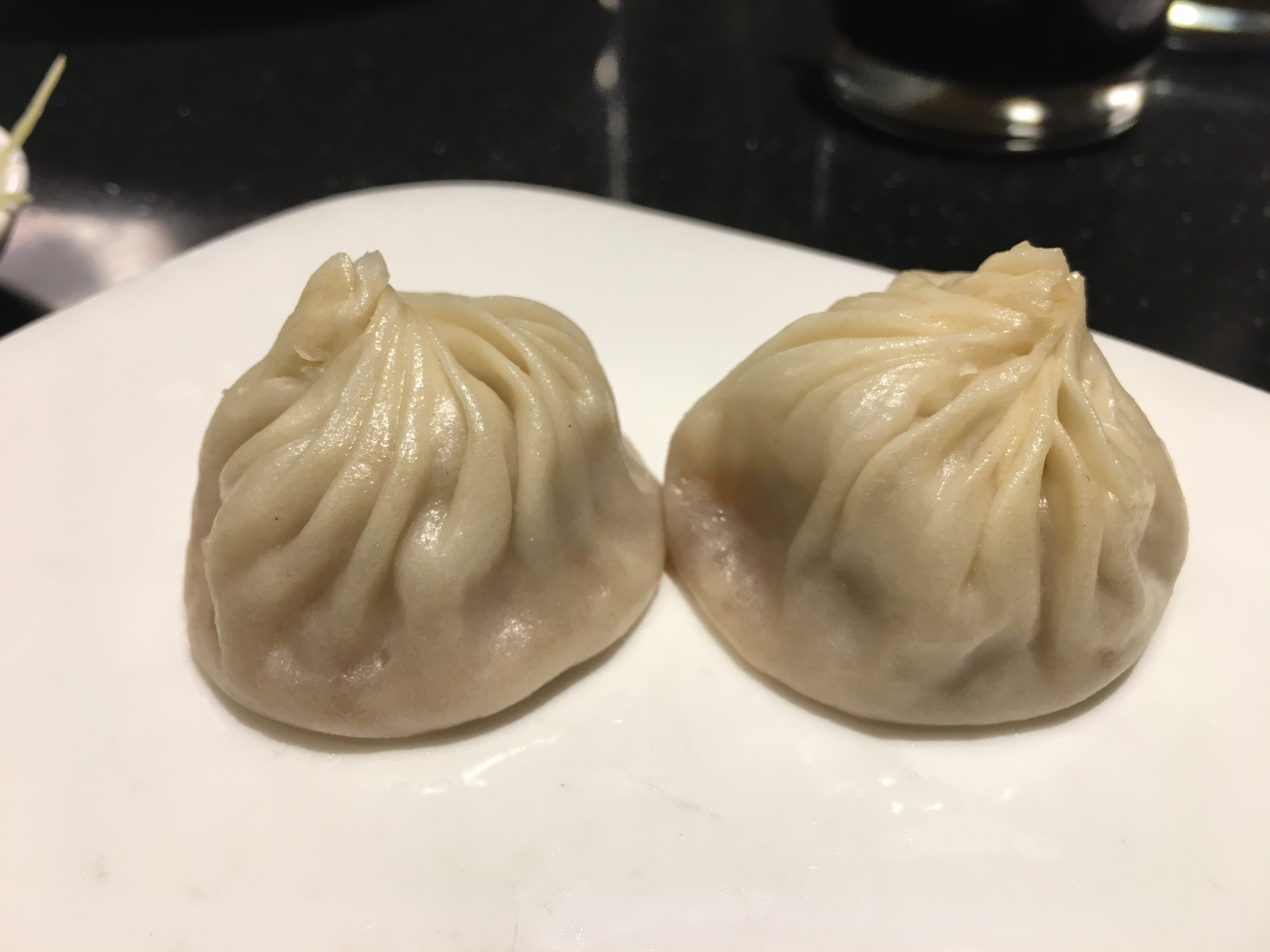
Xiaolongbao are typically made of minced pork wrapped in flour dough

Chinese buns, in general, may be divided into two types, depending on the degree of leavening of the flour skin. Buns can be made with leavened or unleavened dough. Those made with unleavened dough use clear water for mixing; the skin is thin and the fillings large. It is frequently made in Nanxiang but is imitated elsewhere, called “Xiang-style”. Steamed buns made with raised flour are seen throughout China and are what is usually referred to as mantou. Steamed xiaolongbao made with partially raised flour are more commonly seen in the south. This means that their skin is tender, smoother, and somewhat translucent, rather than being white and fluffy. As is traditional for buns of various sizes in the Jiangnan region, xiaolongbao is pinched at the top prior to steaming, so the skin has a circular cascade of ripples around the crown.

Xiaolongbao are traditionally filled with pork. More modern innovations include other meats, seafood, shrimp, crab meat, and vegetarian fillings. Some restaurants offer creative fillings including sea urchin, foie gras, cheese, garlic, and truffle as well as dessert fillings like yam, red bean, chocolate, taro, and black sesame.

Soup dumplings are created by wrapping solid meat aspic inside the skin alongside the meat filling. Heat from steaming then melts the gelatin-gelled aspic into soup. In modern times, refrigeration has made the process of making tangbao during hot weather easier, since making gelled aspic is much more difficult at room temperature.

== Serving ==
Xiaolongbao are traditionally eaten for breakfast. The buns are served hot in the bamboo baskets in which they were steamed, usually on a bed of dried leaves or a paper mat, although some restaurants now use napa cabbage instead. The buns are usually dipped in Zhenjiang vinegar with chili crisp.

Traditionally, tangbao soup dumplings are a kind of dim sum (à la carte item) or xiaochi (snack). The buns are usually dipped in Zhenjiang vinegar with ginger slivers. They are traditionally served with a clear soup on the side. Around Shanghai, "tangbao" may be eaten throughout the day, although usually not for breakfast. They form part of a traditional Jiangnan-style morning tea (早茶). In Guangdong and the Western world, it is sometimes served as a dish during Cantonese tea time. Frozen tangbao are now mass-produced and a popular frozen food sold worldwide.

Restaurants serve xiaolongbao hot in bamboo steamers, sometimes with lettuce or parchment paper at the base to prevent them from sticking to the bottom. There are various methods of eating xiaolongbao. To avoid spilling the soup, one way to eat the bun is to hold the bun with the eater's spoon and bite a hole to suck the soup before eating the remainder, while others may place the bun and any condiments in the spoon and ingest it in the mouth at one time.

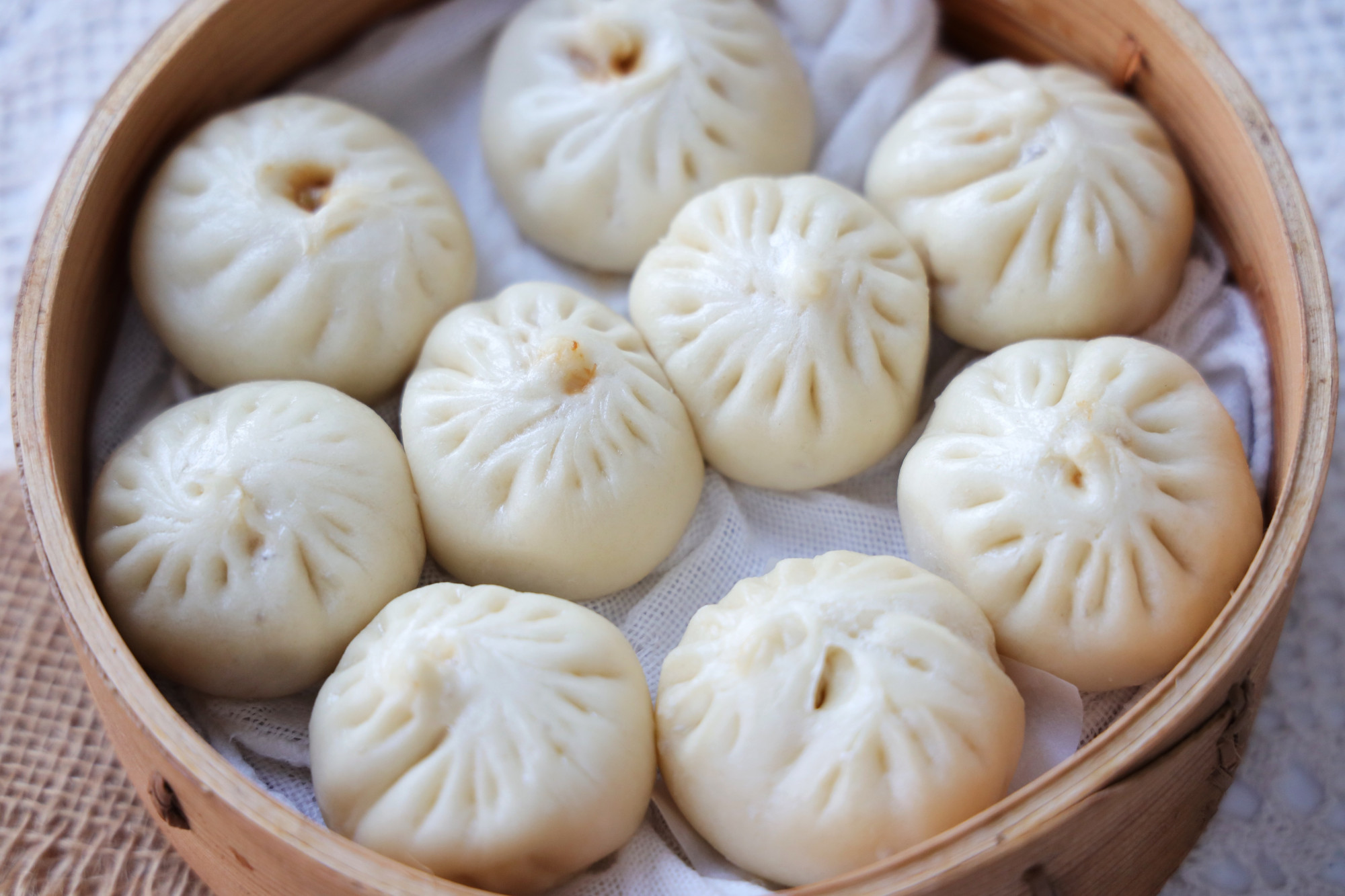
Served as breakfast

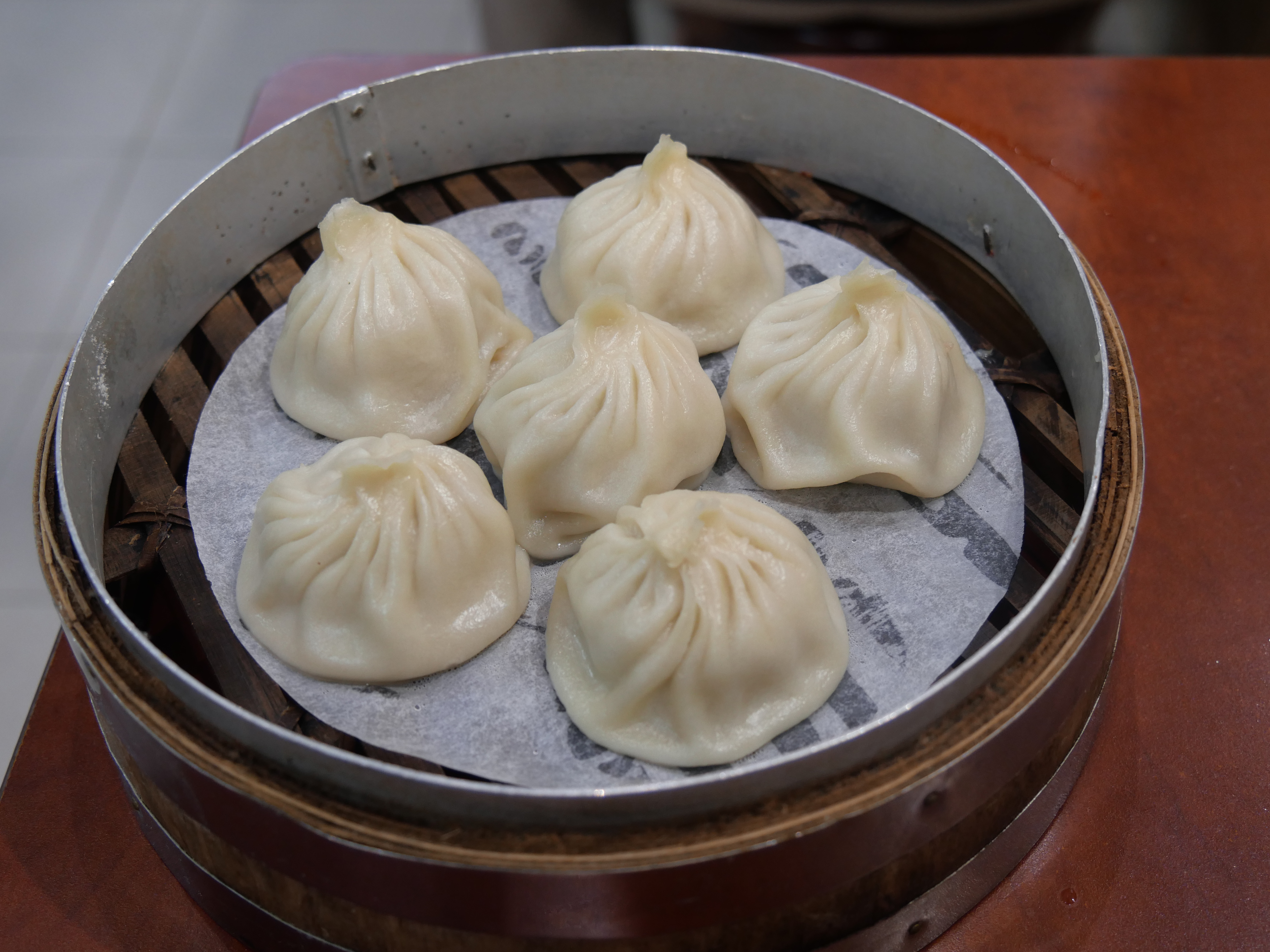

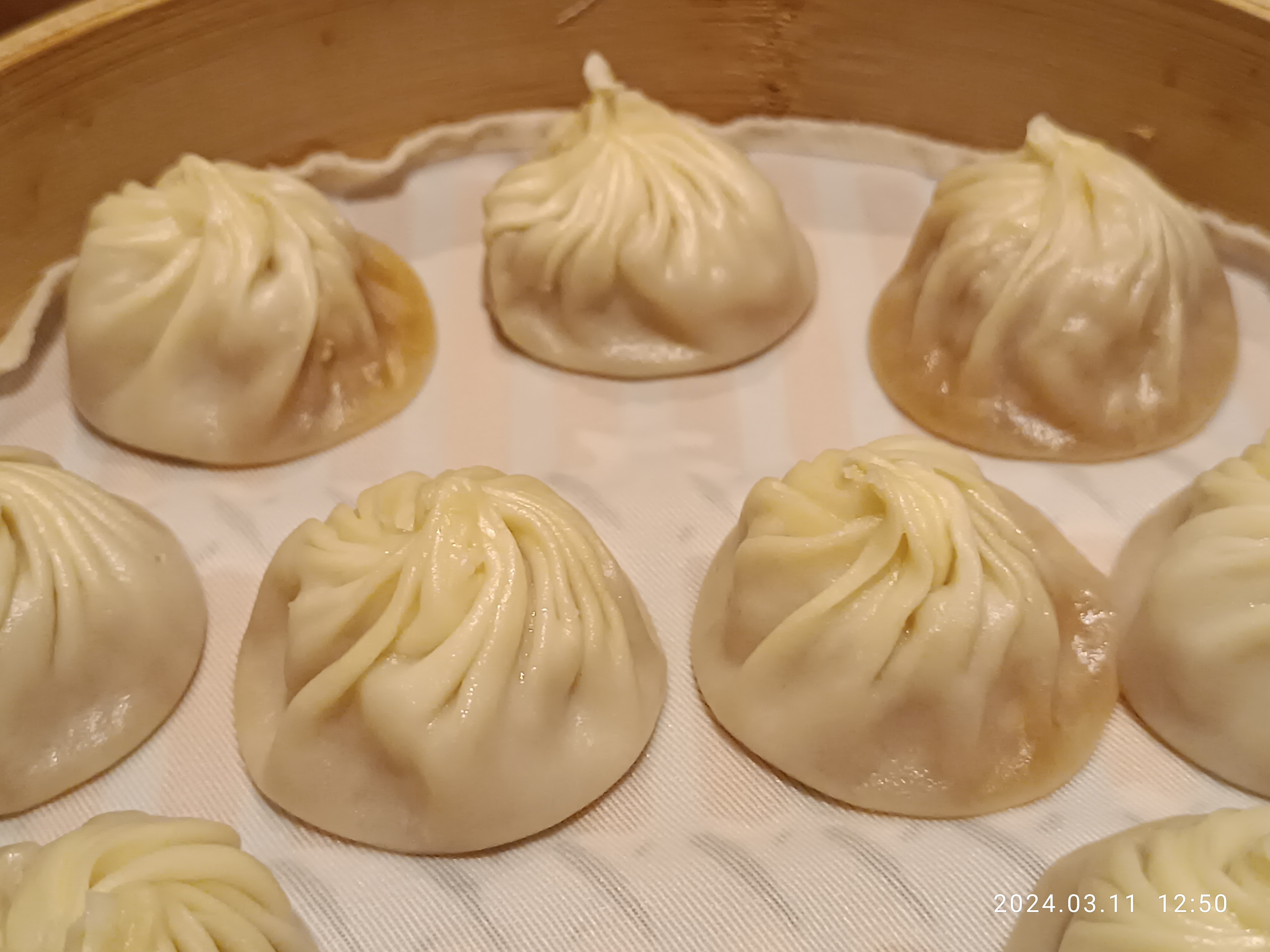

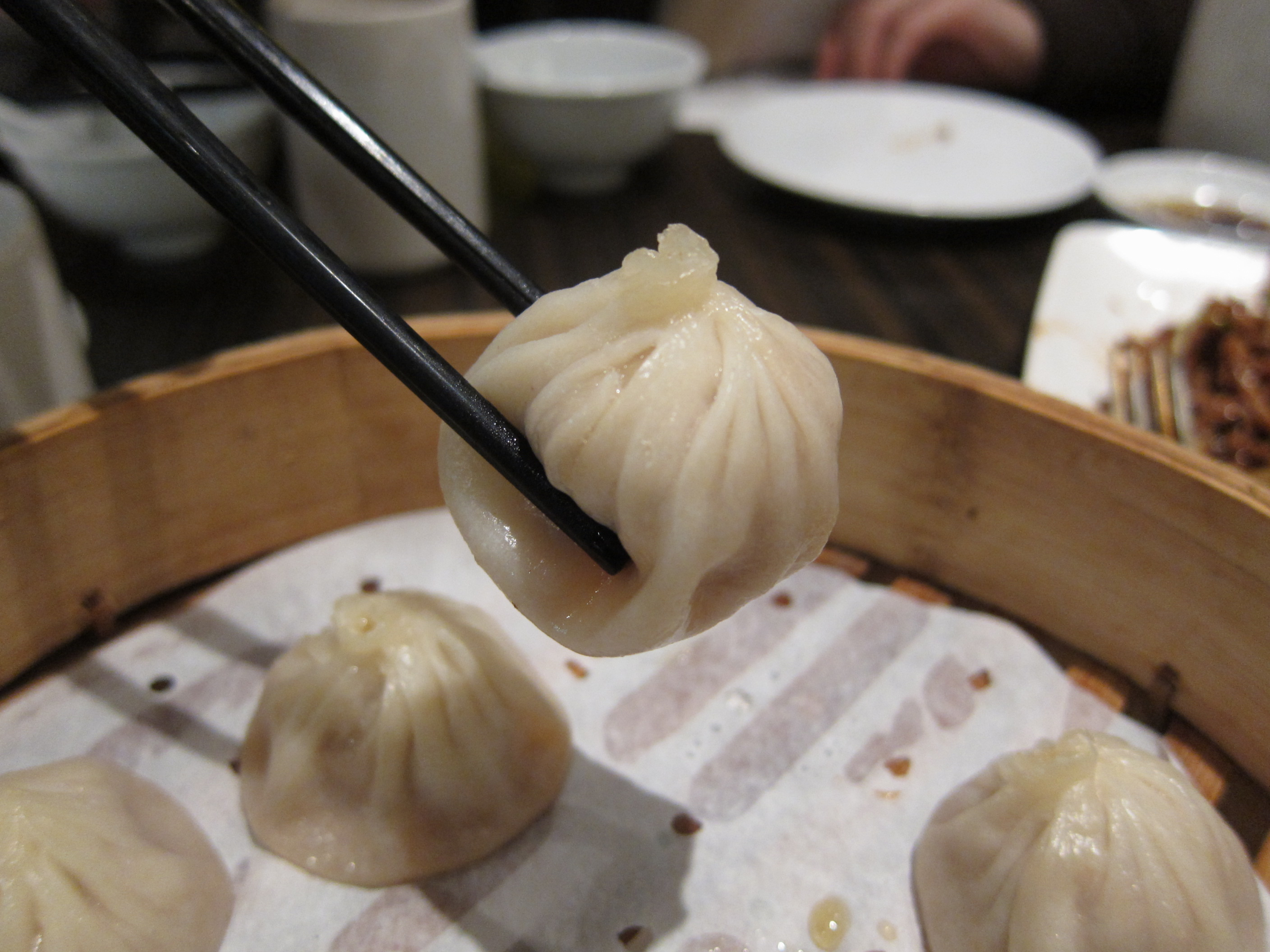

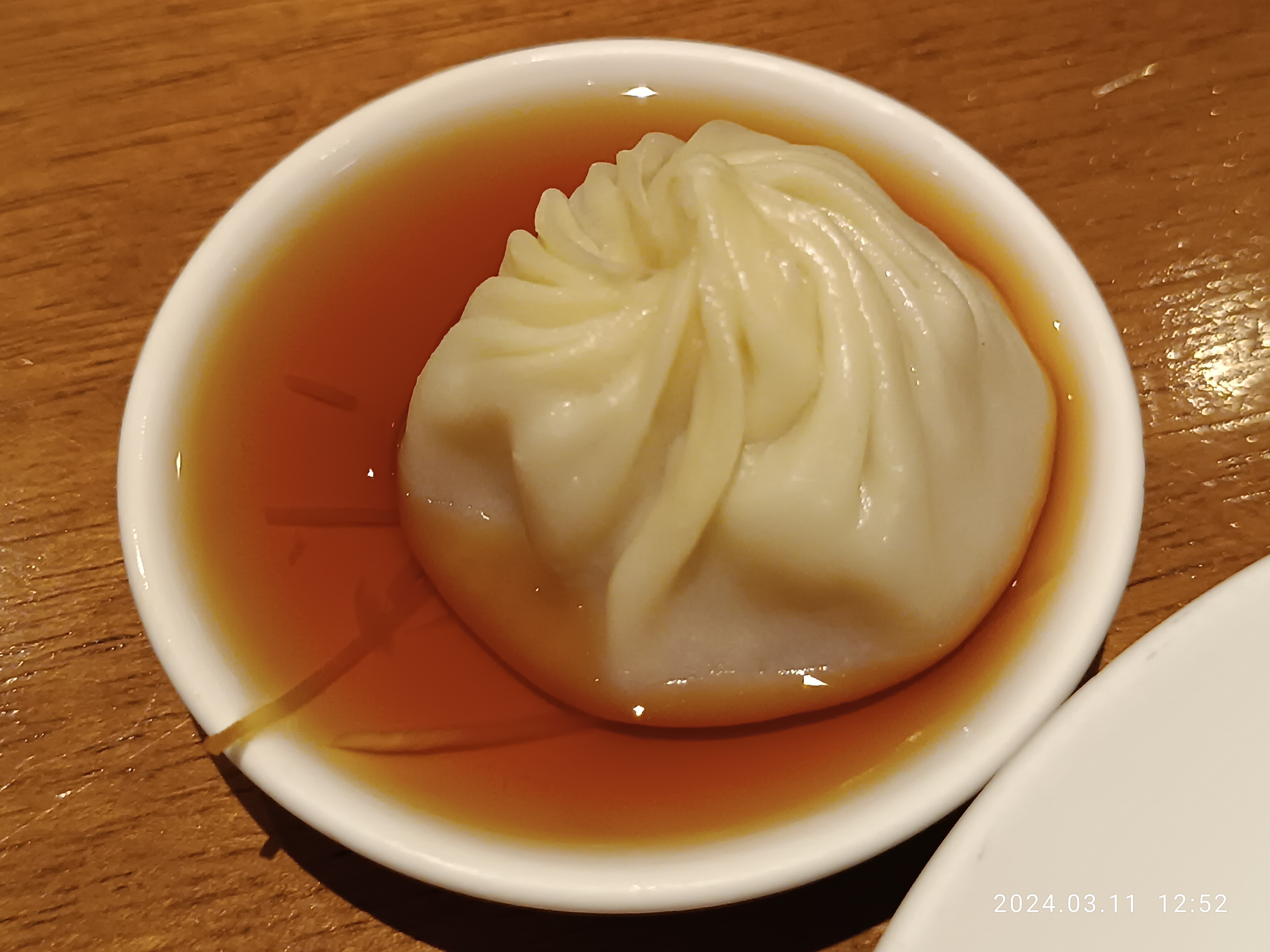
In vinegar sauce

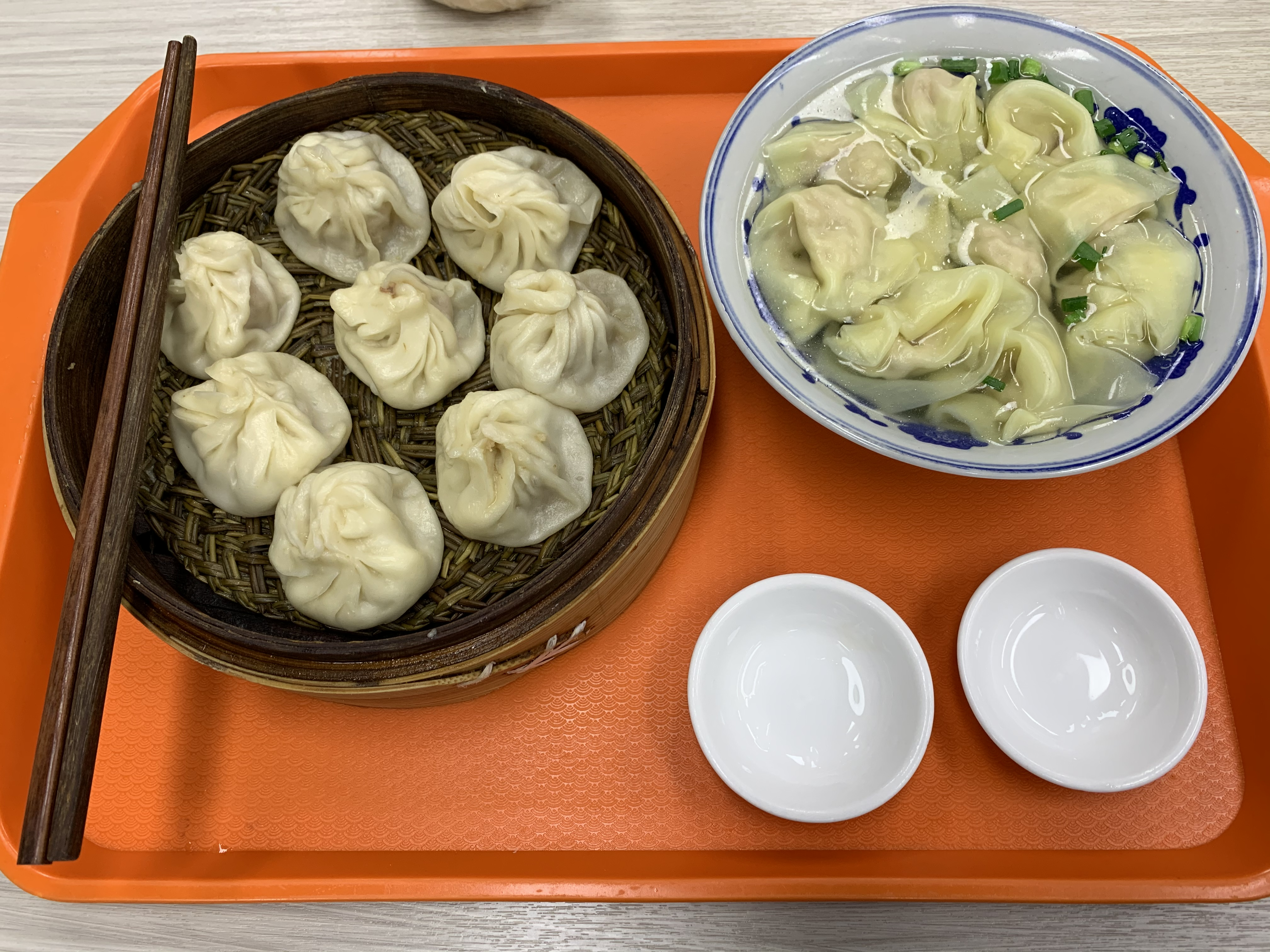
With wontons

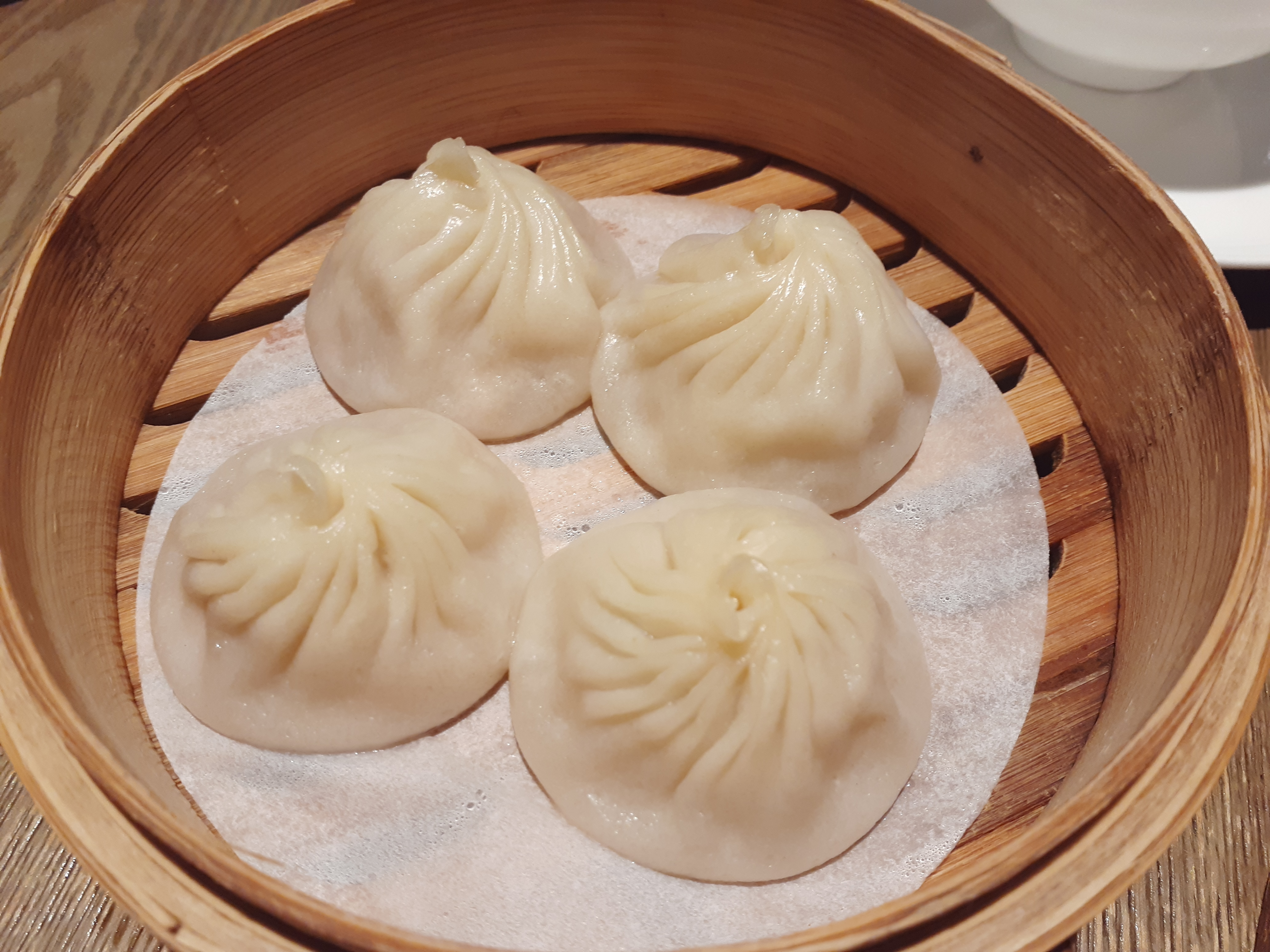
In a bamboo steamer

== Types ==
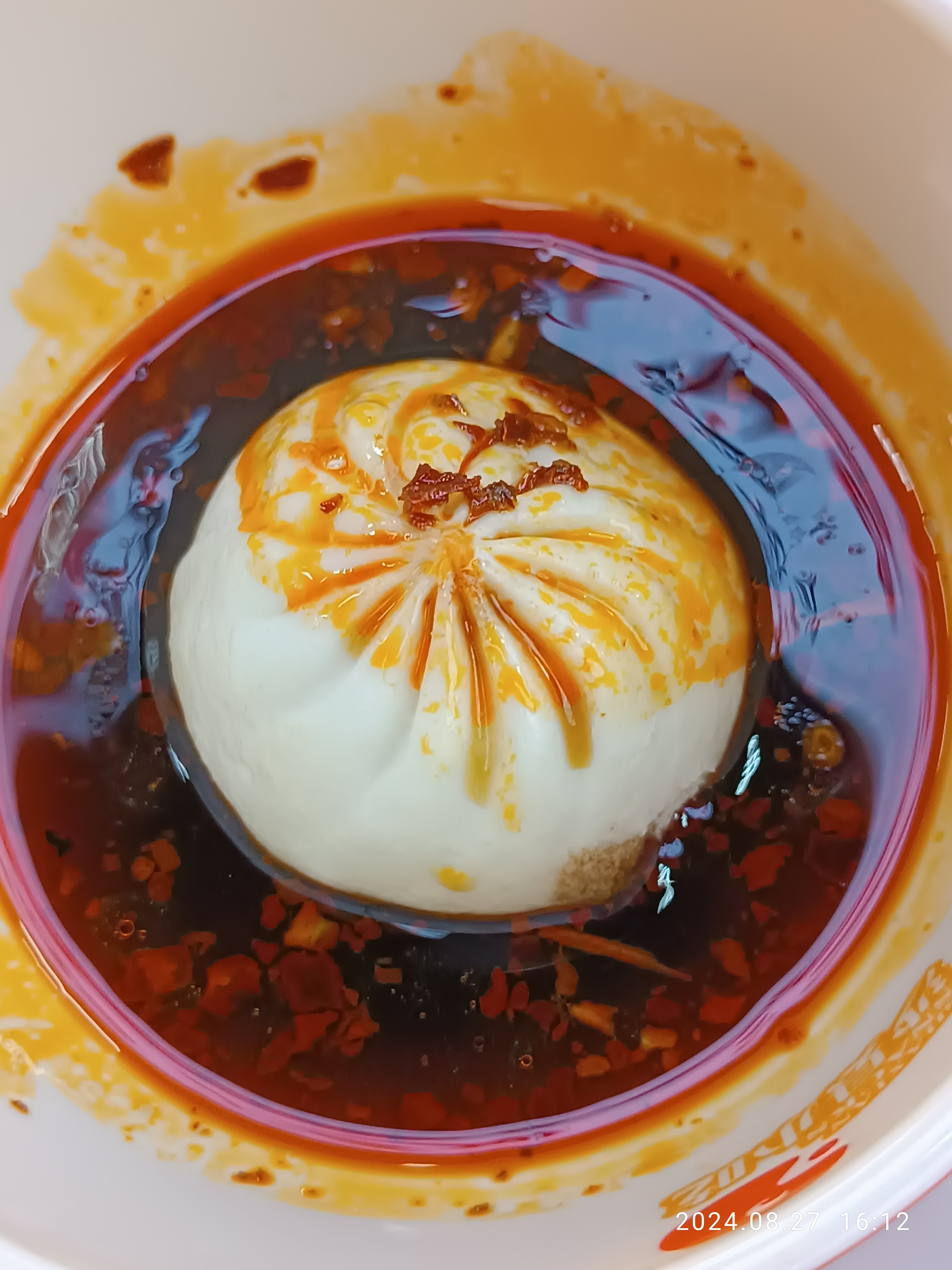
Xiaolongbao in chili oil from Guangdong

=== Changzhou ===
The modern form of xiaolongbao from Changzhou originated during the Qing dynasty. The buns from Changzhou are known for their thin wraps, and the soup that spills out after each bite. Among the types, crab-filled xiaolongbao is the most well known type in Changzhou, and are eaten after the Mid-Autumn Festival.

=== Shanghai ===
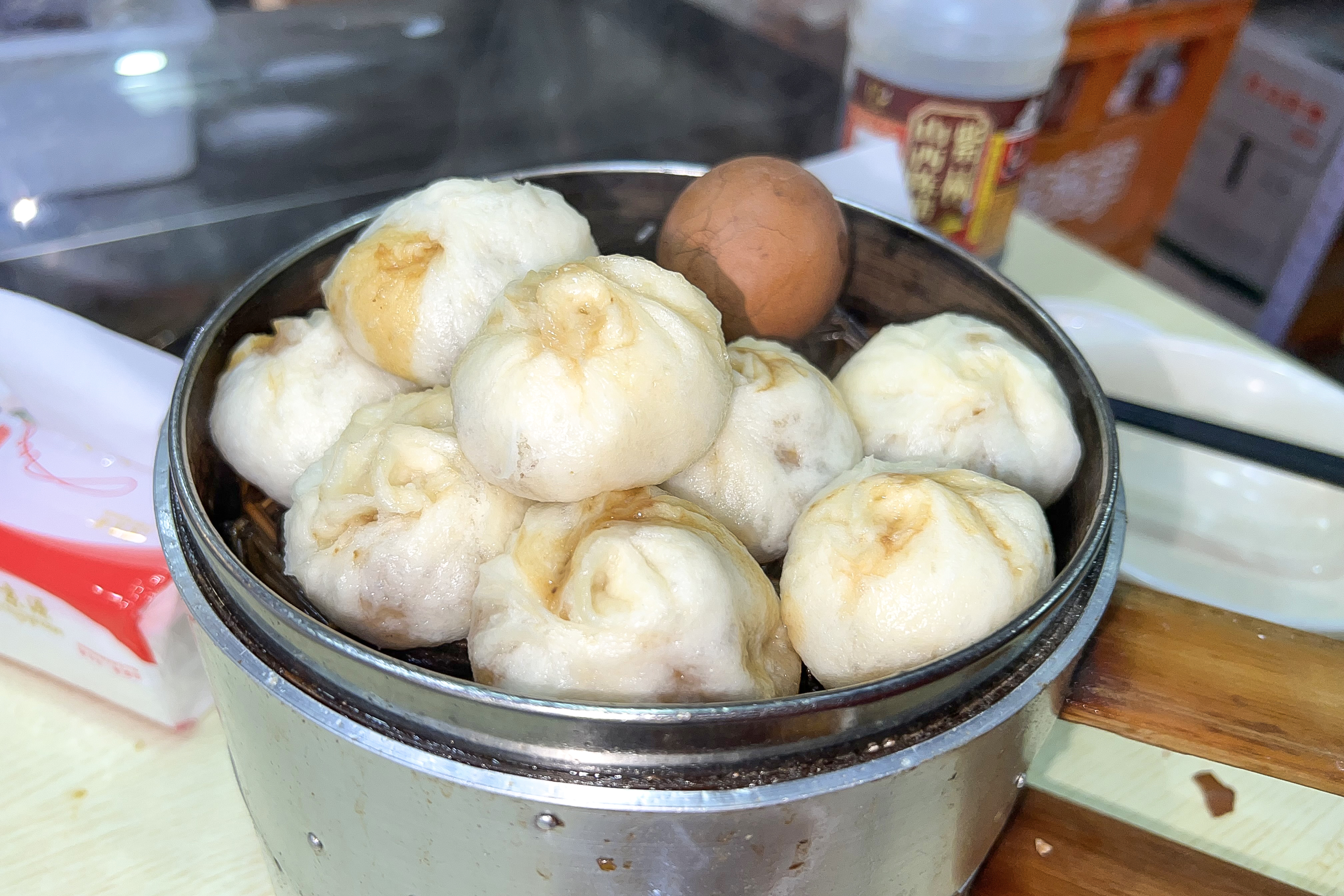
Shengzhou-style xiaolongbao with tea eggs

In Shanghai, xiaolongbao are usually filled with pork; crabmeat and shrimp are also present but in the minority.

=== Tianjin ===
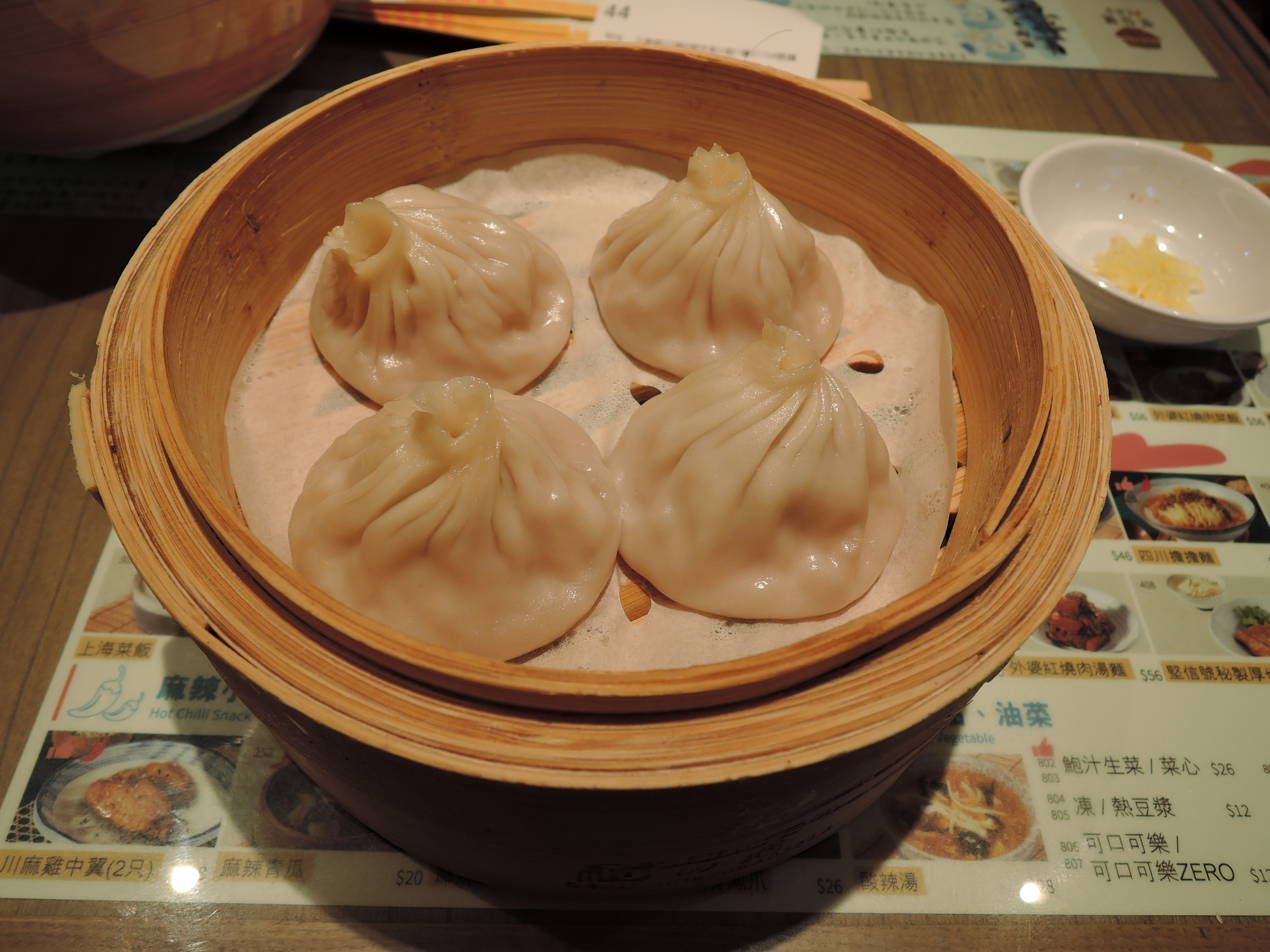
Xiaolongbao from Hong Kong

Goubuli baozi are a brand of tangbao created in 1858 by a restaurant in Tianjin.

=== Kaifeng ===
Kaifeng xiaolongbao, created during the Song dynasty, is also known as soup-filled xiaolongbao. Many famous cooks created their own ways of making soup-filled dumplings in Kaifeng and improved the techniques throughout history. Kaifeng xiaolongbao looks like a "lantern" when they are lifted, and a "flower" when it sits in the steaming basket.

=== Hong Kong ===
Hong Kong xiaolongbao look like Changzhou xiaolongbao but have a slightly spicy taste, due to the addition of ginger and sometimes spring onion in the filling. The wrapper is chewier and harder than the normal ones. Despite the difference, it is labelled as Shanghai xiaolongbao.

== See also ==
- Baozi
- Din Tai Fung
- Dumpling
- Jiaozi
- Khinkali
- List of steamed foods
- List of buns
- Momo (food)
- Shanghainese cuisine
- Shengjian mantou
- Siopao
- Salteña, another dumpling with a gelatin-based liquid filling
