= Dozer (disambiguation) =

A dozer, or bulldozer, is a type of tracked tractor with a large front blade.

Dozer may also refer to:

== People ==
- Brittany Gibson, Australian rules footballer referred to as "Dozer"
- Donald Marquand Dozer, American scholar of Latin American history
- Mike "Dozer" Shower, American politician
- Otis (wrestler), formerly named "Dozer"

== Places ==
- Dozer cave, cave in Western Australia
- Dozer Park, baseball field located in downtown Peoria, Illinois

== Other ==
- Dozer (band), a stoner rock band from Sweden
- Dozer, a character in the movie The Matrix
- Dozer, a GoBots toy produced by Tonka

== See also ==
- Snow dozer, unique snowplow design of the Great Northern Railway
- Doozers, characters in the children's Television series Fraggle Rock
- Doze (disambiguation)
- Dozor
- Drill Dozer, video game for the Game Boy Advance
- Nochnoy Dozor (disambiguation)
