= The Amazing Race =

Adventure reality competition franchise

- Created by: Elise Doganieri; Bertram van Munster
- Original work: The Amazing Race (United States)
- Years: 2001–present

Films and television
- Television series: The Amazing Race (see international versions)

Miscellaneous
- Genre: Adventure; Reality competition
- First aired: September 5, 2001; 25 years ago
- Distributor: CBS Media Ventures (United States); Disney Platform Distribution (International)

The Amazing Race is an adventure reality competition franchise in which teams of two people race around the world in competition with other teams. The Amazing Race is split into legs, with teams tasked to deduce clues, navigate themselves in foreign areas, interact with locals, and perform physical and mental challenges that often highlight aspects of a location's culture, history, or economy. Over the course of the Race, teams travel by airplanes, helicopters, trucks, bicycles, taxicabs, cars, trains, buses, boats and by foot. Teams are progressively eliminated at the end of most legs for being the last to arrive at designated Pit Stops, until only three remain. The first team to arrive at the finish line is awarded the grand prize.

Created by Elise Doganieri and Bertram van Munster, the original series has aired in the United States since 2001 and has earned thirteen Primetime Emmy Awards, ten of them for "Outstanding Reality Competition Program". Emmy-Award-winning New Zealand television personality Phil Keoghan has been the host of the American version of the show since its inception. The show has branched out to include a number of international versions following a similar format.

== The Race ==
Each race depicted in The Amazing Race is broken up into a number of legs. In each leg, teams generally leave the Pit Stop of the previous leg and travel to a different location, where they perform two or more tasks – often including one Detour and one Roadblock – before being given instructions to go to the next pit stop. It is every team's goal to complete each leg as quickly as possible, as the last team to arrive at the pit stop is usually eliminated from the competition.

=== Teams ===
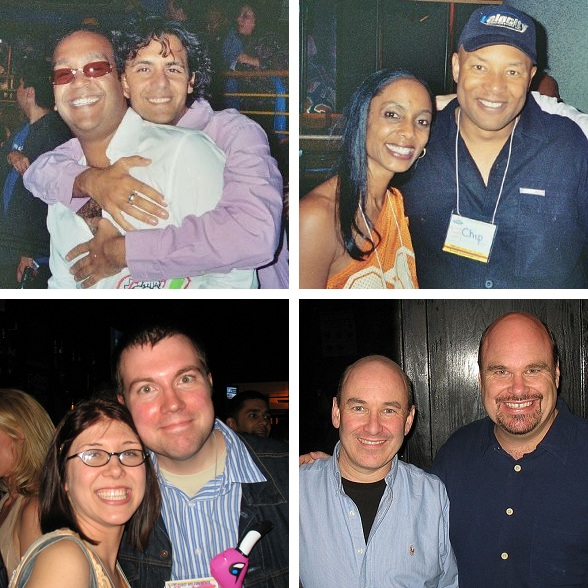
Top row: best friends Danny Jimenez & Oswald Mendez of season 2 and the first All Stars, and spouses Kim & Chip McAllister of season 5. Bottom row: dating couple Lori Willems & Dave Spiker of season 9, and brothers Gerard & Ken Duphiney of season 3

Typically, each season features around a dozen or so teams, each composed of two people with a pre-existing relationship. Original show rules required that teammates have a pre-existing relationship of more than three years and no previous acquaintance with other racers during that cycle. Individual racers must be of a specific nationality and meet specific age requirements; this is necessary to allow teams to obtain the necessary passport documentation to travel across the world without incident.

The team format has varied in some seasons. Most notably, the Family Edition featured ten teams of four racers, some of whom were young children. The twenty-sixth and twenty-ninth seasons included teams made up of people who met for the first time just prior to the start of the race - in the former, they were paired by producers based on potential romantic compatibility, while in the latter, teams were determined in a draft based on the outcome of an opening challenge. Occasionally, seasons may be themed around those with some celebrity status, paired with their loved ones- notably, the twenty-eighth season featured social media celebrities and multiple seasons of the Australian edition have featured celebrities and those seasons have been billed as a Celebrity Edition.

Normally unseen, a two-person production crew, one recording audio and the other recording video, accompanies every team. Generally, teams may not travel without their production crew, who are switched among teams after each leg to avoid biases from developing.

=== Money ===
At the beginning of each leg, each team receives a cash allowance with their first clue, which they must use to cover all expenses except for airfare, which is covered by a production-provided credit card. In the eighth season, this card could also be used to purchase gasoline. Allowance money is usually given in U.S. dollars regardless of location. The amount of money varies from leg to leg. Teams are allowed to keep any unused money for future legs, barring certain penalties for finishing last or instructions to the contrary.

If team members spend all of their money or have it taken away in a non-elimination leg, they may then attempt to obtain more money in any way that does not violate local laws; this includes borrowing money from other teams, begging from locals, or selling their possessions. Since the seventh season, teams have been prevented from begging at United States airports, and teams may not use their personal possessions to barter payment for services.

=== Route markers ===
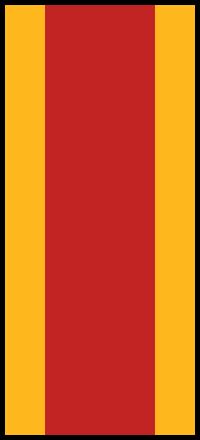
A standard Route Marker looks like this.

Route markers are uniquely-colored flags that mark the places where teams must go. Most route markers are attached to the boxes that contain clue envelopes, but some may mark the places where the teams must go in order to complete tasks, or may be used to line courses that the teams must follow.

The route markers used in the first season were yellow and white. They were changed to yellow and red in the second season, and this has remained the standard color scheme since. Occasionally, different color schemes are adopted for certain legs, seasons, or versions of the race.

=== Clue types ===
Type	Card color	Description	Failure / Penalty
Route Information	Blue	Directs teams to their next location or task. May require figuring out cryptic destinations, navigating via specific transportation, or following travel restrictions.	Teams must backtrack to fix transport violations or serve a penalty at the Pit Stop.
Detour	Yellow	A choice between two different tasks, each testing different skills (e.g., physical vs. mental). Teams may switch tasks at any time.	6-hour penalty for quitting (24 hours in early seasons).
Roadblock	Red	A task that only one team member can perform, chosen based on a cryptic prompt before reading the full description. Total Roadblocks per racer are limited.	4-hour penalty for quitting.
Fast Forward	Green	An optional challenge that allows the first team to complete it to skip all remaining tasks in the leg and head directly to the Pit Stop.	None directly; losing teams must return and complete the leg normally.

=== Obstacles and twists ===
Obstacle / Twist	Introduced	Description
Starting Line Task	Season 15	A challenge at the very beginning of the race that determines early flight choices, advantages, penalties, or immediate elimination.
Yield	Season 5	Allows one team to force another team to stop racing until an hourglass drains (or incense burns out).
Pass	Canada Season 8	Forces a team to wait until another team passes them before they can continue racing.
U-Turn	Season 12	Forces a designated team to complete both tasks of a Detour. Variants include Blind, Double, Automatic, and U-Turn Vote.
One Way	Canada Season 7	Forces a designated team to complete a specific option of a Detour.
Intersection	Season 10	Requires two teams to pair up and perform all tasks and decisions together until instructed otherwise.
Head-to-Head / Face Off	Latin America Season 2 / Norway Season 2	Teams compete directly against each other 1-on-1 in a task. Winners move on; losers wait for the next team.
T-Junction	Australia v New Zealand	All remaining teams divide into two large super-teams to complete an entire leg or challenge together.
Hazard	Season 19	A penalty task given specifically to the team that finished last in the Starting Line Task.
Switchback	Season 15	A recreation of an iconic or exceptionally difficult task from a past season.
Stowaway Teams	China Season 2 / Australia Season 5	New or eliminated teams brought into the race mid-season.
Partner Swap	Season 30	Teammates switch partners with another team for the duration of a leg.
Double-Length / Mega Leg	Season 6	Extended legs featuring double the tasks (two Detours and two Roadblocks) before reaching a Pit Stop.
City Sprint	Season 32	A leg completed entirely within a city featuring no Detours or Roadblocks.
Scramble	Season 34	Teams are given three tasks or locations that can be completed/visited in any order.
Fork in the Road	Season 37	Teams choose between two distinct race paths, with one team eliminated at the end of each path.
Driver's Seat	Season 37	The first team to arrive chooses the difficulty level of the next task for all competing teams.
Valet Roulette	Season 37	Teams blindly choose between a manual or automatic transmission vehicle.

=== Non-elimination leg penalties ===
Penalty Type	Introduced	Description
Stripped of Money / Belongings	Season 5	The team is stripped of all cash (and sometimes all possessions except passports) at the start of the next leg.
Marked for Elimination	Season 10	The team must finish 1st on the next leg or serve a 30-minute penalty at the Pit Stop.
Speed Bump	Season 12	An extra task the last-place team must complete during the next leg before continuing.
Handicap	Norway Season 1	Modifies a standard task to make it harder or longer for the penalized team.
Delayed Start	Israel Season 3	The team must wait an extra period (e.g., 30 to 90 minutes) before departing on the next leg.
U-Turn Penalty Vote	Season 38	The team automatically receives a vote against them in the next U-Turn vote.
Automatic U-Turn	Season 39	The team is automatically U-Turned in addition to other team(s) in the U-Turn vote.

=== Gameplay prizes and advantages ===
Advantage	Introduced	Effect
Express Pass	Season 17	Allows a team to skip any single task of their choice before a specified leg. Variants include Double and Triple passes.
The Assist / Roadside Assistance	Canada Season 9 / US Season 39	Allows a team to make a designated challenge easier to complete. Roadside Assistance allows a non-participating team member to assist their teammate in a Roadblock.
Salvage Pass	Australia Season 2	Gives the option of a 1-hour head start on the next leg or saving the last-place team from elimination.
First Class Pass	Australia Season 5	Allows leg winners to skip the next leg entirely and enjoy a luxury experience while others race.
The Save	Season 25	Allows a team to avoid elimination if they finish last in an elimination leg (valid through Leg 9).
Return Ticket / On Ramp Pass	China Season 3 / Canada Season 8	Grants the power to bring an eliminated team back into the competition.
Double Your Money	Season 21	Doubles the grand prize to $2,000,000 if the winning team goes on to win the entire race.

=== Standard rules and penalties ===
Rule infraction	Standard penalty duration
Quitting a Detour	6 hours (24 hours in Seasons 1–15)
Quitting a Roadblock, Speed Bump, or Handicap	4 hours
Quitting a Route Info	2 hours
Flying outside Economy Class	24 hours (or price difference plus time gained)
Bartering personal belongings for services	2 hours
Standard task / route infraction	30 minutes + time gained
Minor task violation	15 minutes

== Production ==
The production of The Amazing Race is a challenge due to its premise being a race around the world. Among the difficult duties that producers face, scouting out locations, designing tasks, selecting teams, and planning logistics for the entire course are the most important to accomplish in pre-production. During the Race, the camera crews need to keep up with the movement of the teams and the host. And when the footage for the entire season has been recorded and edited, team members, production crew as well as the local staff who hosted or facilitated the tasks are obliged to keep the details of the race confidential and not leak out anything that hints at locations, events, or outcomes of the Race. An exception is the television network that airs the show in a country which hosted one of the legs where they can air teasers such as "Who among the teams will come here to (the network's home country name)?" However, in recent American seasons, CBS had released a map to show the locations that the racers would be visiting.

The show is broadcast on CBS in the United States and simulcast via satellite in various networks around the world.

Through its efforts, the American version has received many accolades, including Primetime Emmy Awards and nominations in categories for audio and video production and editing. In 2010, CBS announced that season 18 of the show would be broadcast in high definition.

== International versions ==
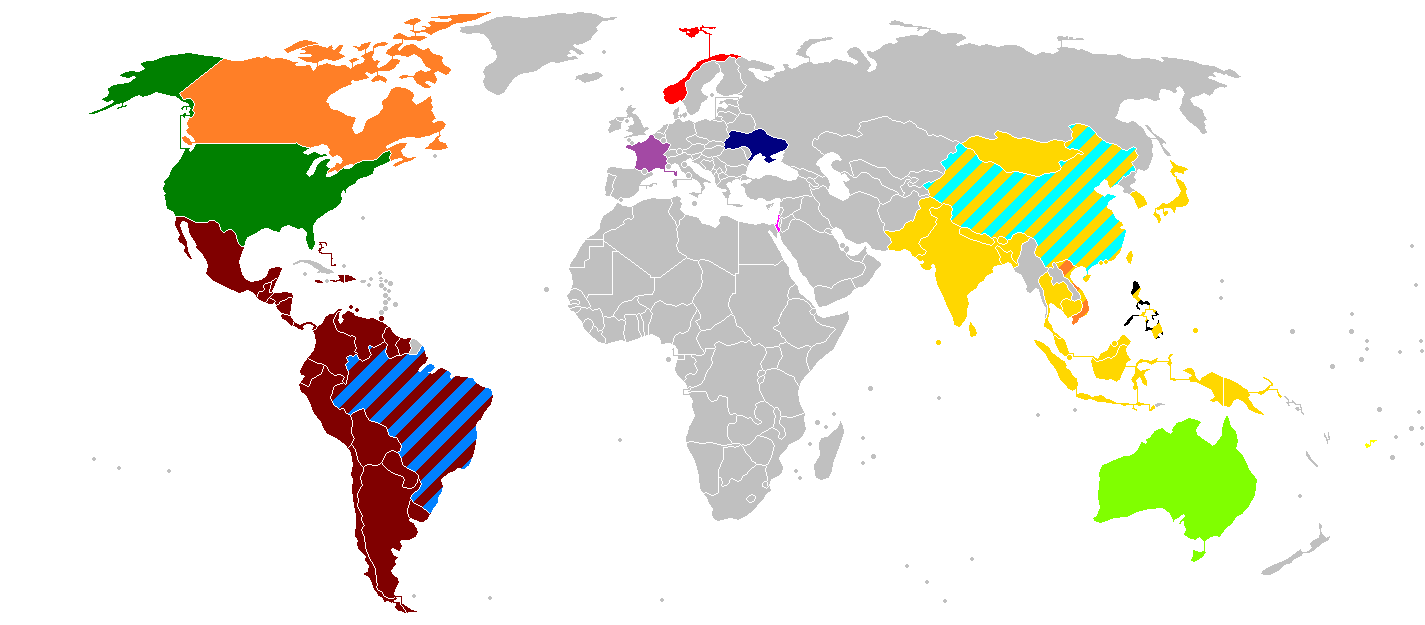
Countries and regions with their own version of The Amazing Race The Amazing Race The Amazing Race Asia The Amazing Race: A Corrida Milionária (Brazil) HaMerotz LaMillion (Israel) The Amazing Race (Latin America) The Amazing Race: China Rush and The Amazing Race China The Amazing Race Australia The Amazing Race Norge (Norway) Velyki Perehony (Ukraine) The Amazing Race Vietnam Amazing Race (France) The Amazing Race Philippines The Amazing Race Canada Amazing Race Suomi (Finland)

The original version of The Amazing Race is the American version, which debuted on CBS on September 5, 2001, with Phil Keoghan as the host. In October 2005, CBS optioned The Amazing Race for franchising to other countries.

=== Asia and Oceania ===
The Amazing Race Asia was the first Asian version of the show. The regional version was bought by Buena Vista International Television – Asia Pacific (BVITV–AP) and Sony Pictures Television International in October 2005. Auditions were then announced that took place in February to March 2006. The show first aired on November 9, 2006, on AXN Asia and was hosted by Allan Wu. The show aired for three more seasons, with the last season having ended in 2010. After a six-year hiatus, the series was announced to be returning for a 5th season to air in late 2016.

On April 8, 2008, Israeli television network Reshet announced their own their version of the show, HaMerotz LaMillion ('The Race to the Million'). Its first season premiered on February 5, 2009, on Channel 2. The host for the first season was Raz Meirman, and Ron Shahar hosted from 2011 to 2020. The first four seasons of the show was a co-production by Reshet and activeTV, an Australian production company that had also produced the Asian version of the race. Another four seasons were produced in-house by Reshet. The series moved to Channel 13 in late 2017. After the eighth season, the show went on hiatus for two years until October 2022, when it was announced that the ninth season would be produced by Keshet Media Group and broadcast on Channel 12, with Yehuda Levi serving as the new host. The season was broadcast during the Gaza War from July to September 2024. A tenth season was announced in October 2024.

In March 2010, a Chinese version of the show, The Amazing Race: China Rush, was announced by the Disney–ABC International Television Asia Pacific. The show was produced by Shanghai-based international production company Fly Films; the company had previously produced Shanghai Rush in 2009, a show heavily influenced by The Amazing Race. The first season was filmed between March and April 2010 and aired in August 2010 by International Channel of Shanghai and was hosted by Allan Wu, who had also previously hosted the Asian version. The Chinese version ran for three seasons, with the last season having ended in 2012. In 2014, Shenzhen Media Group announced they had bought the rights to The Amazing Race and would be producing a new Chinese version of the program, unrelated to Shanghai Media Group's China Rush.

On July 19, 2010, Australian channel Seven Network purchased the format rights to produce the Australian series. The Amazing Race Australia was produced by activeTV in association with ABC Studios and was distributed by Disney Media Distribution Asia Pacific. The host for the first 3 series was New Zealand-born actor Grant Bowler. Two series were produced in 2011 and 2012 and after a brief hiatus in 2013, a third season was produced in-house and without activeTV in 2014. This series also included teams from both Australia and New Zealand. Following another hiatus for five years, the show was revived by Network 10 in 2019. This new series was produced by Eureka Productions and hosted by former rugby league footballer Beau Ryan. The first season of 10's iteration – and the fourth season overall – premiered on October 28, 2019. The seventh through ninth seasons were celebrity editions.

On March 26, 2011, it was announced that TV5 had acquired the rights to produce a Philippine version of The Amazing Race. The first season of The Amazing Race Philippines aired on October 29, 2012, and ended on December 15, 2012. Derek Ramsay hosted the show. The show aired a second season in 2014.

Vietnam bought the format as The Amazing Race Vietnam – Cuộc đua kỳ thú. It was announced on March 1, 2012, by BHD Corp. and VTV3. Dustin Nguyen served as the director, executive producer and host of the first season of the show. The second, third, and fifth seasons were broadcast with Huy Khánh as the host, with Phan Anh filling in during the fourth season. After a three-year hiatus, the show was revived with Song Luân as host.

=== Europe ===
During 2005, AXN Central Europe announced a version of the show to be called The Amazing Race Central Europe. Applications were closed with the submission of 2,500 applicants, with filming expected to have occurred in 2006 and broadcast from September 2006. The show was cast but was never filmed.

By October 2011, a Norwegian version of the show titled The Amazing Race Norge was announced by TV 2. Applications were open from October 11, 2011, to October 31, 2011. Filming took place in January 2012. Ex-football player Freddy dos Santos hosted the show. The first season premiered on April 11, 2012. The second and latest season ended on May 29, 2013.

On March 23, 2012, a French version of the show was announced. It was produced by Shine France for D8 with filming having occurred between June and July 2012. It premiered on October 22 of the same year. The finale aired on December 24.

On July 23, 2012, a Ukrainian version of the show was announced, called Velyki Perehony. It premiered on April 13, 2013, at 20:00, and concluded on June 29, 2013.

On April 12, 2023, Iltalehti revealed that a Finnish version of The Amazing Race was being made. Filmed from July 24 to August 16, 2023, and premiered on September 30 on Nelonen, the Finnish Amazing Race features celebrity contestants in a race around the world. After a successful adaption of the format, the Finnish version was renewed for a second season, which premiered in 2024.

=== The Americas ===
In late 2006, a South-American independent production company announced that it would produce a Brazilian version in 2007, to be called The Amazing Race: A Corrida Milionária, and to be aired in a purchased time slot in the Brazilian network RedeTV!. Applications were open from January until July, and filming occurred during August and September. The first and only season premiered on October 13, 2007, and concluded on January 5, 2008.

On October 15, 2008, a Latin American version of the show was announced by Discovery Latin America in association with Disney and Harris Whitbeck presented the show. The first season was filmed in early 2009 and broadcast late in that year across Latin America and the Caribbean and the second season aired in late 2010. In January 2011 it was announced that Space acquired the rights to produce the third season of the show. The fourth season also aired on Space in September 2012, but solely composed of Brazilian teams with Paulo Zulu as the host, replacing Whitbeck. In the fifth season, María Victoria "Toya" Montoya, a former contestant from the third season, replaced Whitbeck as regular host of the series.

On November 30, 2012, it was revealed that CTV would produce a Canadian version of The Amazing Race. An announcement made by Phil Keoghan aired on this channel during the December 2, 2012, episode of the American version of the show. The show premiered on July 15, 2013, with Olympic gold medalist Jon Montgomery as host and has since aired eleven seasons.

=== List of international versions ===
As of November 17, 2026, there have been 105 winning teams in over 15 franchises of The Amazing Race and 103 seasons. The most recent winners are twin sisters Tina and Liz Liao from The Amazing Race Canada 12.

Currently airing (2)
An upcoming season (3)
No longer airing (10)
Status unknown (0)

Country/Region	Local title	Network(s)	Winner(s)	Presenter(s)	Prize(s)
Asia	The Amazing Race Asia	AXN Asia	Season 1, 2006–07: Zabrina Fernandez and Joe Jer Tee; Season 2, 2007–08: Adrian Yap and Collin Low; Season 3 (Toughest Race Ever), 2008: Vince Chung and Sam Wu; Season 4, 2010: Richard Hardin and Richard Herrera; Season 5, 2016: Parul Shah and Maggie Wilson	Allan Wu; Tara Basro (5)	US$100,000
Australia; New Zealand (3)	The Amazing Race Australia	Seven Network (1–3); TVNZ (TV2) (3); Network 10 (4–)	Season 1, 2011: Tyler Atkins and Nathan Joliffe; Season 2, 2012: Shane Haw and Andrew Thoday; Season 3 (Australia v New Zealand), 2014: Daniel Little and Ryan Thomas; Season 4, 2019: Tim and Rod Sattler-Jones; Season 5, 2021: Brendon Crawley and Jackson Dening; Season 6 (Around the World), 2022: Heath Curry and Toni Hilland; Season 7 (Celebrity Edition), 2023: Alli Simpson and Angie Simpson, Darren McMullen and Tristan Dougan, Emma Watkins and Haley Watkins (Note: The final three teams were declared joint winners, after agreeing to step on the Finish Line mat together.); Season 8 (Celebrity Edition), 2024: Tai "Bam Bam" and Logan Tuivasa; Season 9 (Celebrity Edition), 2025: Stephen and Bernard Curry; Season 10 (Celebrity Edition), 2028: Upcoming season	Grant Bowler (1–3); Beau Ryan (4–); Scott Tweedie (6)	A$250,000 (1–6) two Isuzu vehicles (6) A$100,000 for charity (Celeb)
Brazil	The Amazing Race: A Corrida Milionária; The Amazing Race: The Millionaire Race	RedeTV!	Season 1, 2007–08: Patricia and Sane	Rony Curvelo	R$500,000
Canada	The Amazing Race Canada	CTV	Season 1, 2013: Tim Hague, Sr. and Tim Hague, Jr.; Season 2, 2014: Mickey Henry and Pete Schmalz; Season 3, 2015: Gino and Jesse Montani; Season 4, 2016: Steph LeClair and Kristen McKenzie; Season 5, 2017: Sam Lambert and Paul Mitskopoulos; Season 6 (Heroes Edition), 2018: Courtney Berglind and Adam Kovacs; Season 7, 2019: Anthony Johnson and James Makokis; Season 8, 2022: Catherine Wreford and Craig Ramsay; Season 9, 2023: Ty Smith and Kat Kastner; Season 10, 2024: Taylor McPherson and Katie Mulkay; Season 11, 2025: Jesse Harink and Jonathon Braun; Season 12, 2026: Tina and Liz Liao; Season 13, 2027: Upcoming season	Jon Montgomery	CA$250,000; trip of two around the world; two Chevrolet vehicles (1-11); "gas for life" from Petro-Canada (2–3)
China	The Amazing Race: China Rush 极速前进：冲刺！中国	ICS; Dragon TV (2–3)	Season 1, 2010: Charlie Gale and Rachel Chen; Season 2, 2011: Lily Li and Jan Höpper; Season 3, 2012: Liu Weiwei and Lei Sheng	Allan Wu	Trip around the World
China	The Amazing Race; China (Season 3–4) 极速前进 (Celebrity Edition)	Shenzhen TV	Season 1, 2014: Zhong Hanliang and Jackie; Season 2, 2015: Han Geng and Wu Xin; Season 3, 2016: Guo Jingjing and Huo Qigang; Season 4, 2017: Jia Jingwen and Xiu Jiekai	Andy On (1); Allan Wu (1–4)	Two trophies; Two Infiniti Q50 (1–2); Money to donate; Pearl Necklace (3)
Finland	Amazing Race Suomi; The Amazing Race Finland (Celebrity Edition)	Nelonen	Season 1, 2023: Kaisa Mäkäräinen and Mari Eder; Season 2, 2024: Metti Forssell and Hanna Launonen; Season 3, 2025–26: Maria Guzenina and Vilma Vähämaa; Season 4, 2026–27: Current season	Heikki Paasonen	€30,000
France	Amazing Race : la plus grande course autour du monde ! Amazing Race: the biggest race around the world!	D8	Season 1, 2012: Anthony Martinage and Sonja Sacha	Alexandre Delpérier	€50,000
Israel	המירוץ למיליון; HaMerotz LaMillion; The Race to the Million	Channel 2 (Reshet) (1–5); Channel 13 (6–8); Channel 12 (9–)	Season 1, 2009: Guy Osadon and Shay Kahana; Season 2, 2011–12: Bar Ben-Vakil and Inna Broder; Season 3, 2013: Talia Gorodess and Koby Windzberg; Season 4, 2014–15: Shay Gavriel and Shani Alon; Season 5, 2016: Amit and Raz Gal; Season 6, 2017–18: Evelin and Tohar Haimovich; Season 7, 2019: Tia Galili and Fay Jakite; Season 8 (All Stars), 2020: Yael Carmon and Yosiel Neeman; Season 9, 2024: Lee and Anne Avrahami; Season 10, 2026: Tom Shelach and Almog Ohayon; Season 11, TBA: Upcoming Season	Raz Meirman (1); Ron Shahar (2–8); Yehuda Levi (9–)	NIS 1,000,000
Latin America	The Amazing Race en Discovery Channel; The Amazing Race on Discovery Channel	Discovery Channel Latin America	Season 1, 2009: Matías Franchini and Tamara Reichelt; Season 2, 2010: Mauricio and Carlos Coarasa	Harris Whitbeck (1–3); Paulo Zulu (4); Toya Montoya (5–6); Jaime Arellano (6)	US$250,000 (1–5) US$100,000 (6)
Latin America	The Amazing Race	Space; TC Televisión (6)	Season 3, 2011: Cristóbal and Nicolás Brain; Season 4 (Edição Brasil), 2012: Daniel Belém and César Curti; Season 5, 2013: Ezequiel Sapochnik and Tobías de la Barra; Season 6 (Ecuador), 2014: Juan Carlos Estrada and Giovanni López	Harris Whitbeck (1–3); Paulo Zulu (4); Toya Montoya (5–6); Jaime Arellano (6)	US$250,000 (1–5) US$100,000 (6)
Norway	The Amazing Race Norge; The Amazing Race Norway	TV 2	Season 1, 2012: Morten and Truls Bjerke; Season 2, 2013: Omar and Bilal Ishqair	Freddy dos Santos	500,000 kr and two cars; Subaru XV (1); Subaru Forester (2)
Philippines	The Amazing Race Philippines	TV5	Season 1, 2012: LJ Moreno and CJ Jaravata; Season 2, 2014: Matt Edwards and Phoebe Walker	Derek Ramsay	₱2,000,000 (1); ₱2,000,000 + 2 Kia Sportage + 2 House and Lot Properties (2)
Ukraine	Великі Перегони; Velyki Perehony; Great Race	1+1	Season 1, 2013: Valeria Nikiforets and Bohdana Primak	Oleksandr "Fozzy" Sydorenko	₴500,000
United States	The Amazing Race (Flagship/Original Edition)	CBS	Season 1, 2001: Rob Frisbee and Brennan Swain; Season 2, Spring 2002: Chris Luca and Alex Boylan; Season 3, Fall 2002: Flo Pesenti and Zach Behr; Season 4, 2003: Reichen Lehmkuhl and Chip Arndt; Season 5, 2004: Chip and Kim McAllister; Season 6, 2004–05: Freddy Holliday and Kendra Bentley; Season 7, Spring 2005: Uchenna and Joyce Agu; Season 8 (Family Edition), Fall 2005: Nick, Alex, Megan and Tommy Linz; Season 9, Spring 2006: B. J. Averell and Tyler MacNiven; Season 10, Fall 2006: Tyler Denk and James Branaman; Season 11 (All-Stars), 2007: Eric Sanchez and Danielle Turner; Season 12, 2007–08: TK Erwin and Rachel Rosales; Season 13, 2008: Nick and Starr Spangler; Season 14, Spring 2009: Tammy and Victor Jih; Season 15, Fall 2009: Meghan Rickey and Cheyne Whitney; Season 16, Spring 2010: Dan and Jordan Pious; Season 17, Fall 2010: Nat Strand and Kat Chang; Season 18 (Unfinished Business), Spring 2011: Kisha and Jen Hoffman; Season 19, Fall 2011: Ernie Halvorsen and Cindy Chiang; Season 20, Spring 2012: Rachel and Dave Brown, Jr.; Season 21, Fall 2012: Josh Kilmer-Purcell and Brent Ridge; Season 22, Spring 2013: Bates and Anthony Battaglia; Season 23, Fall 2013: Jason Case and Amy Diaz; Season 24 (All-Stars), Spring 2014: Dave and Connor O'Leary; Season 25, Fall 2014: Amy DeJong and Maya Warren; Season 26, Spring 2015: Laura Pierson and Tyler Adams; Season 27, Fall 2015: Kelsey Gerckens and Joey Buttitta; Season 28, 2016: Dana Alexa Borriello and Matt Steffanina; Season 29, 2017: Brooke Camhi and Scott Flanary; Season 30, 2018: Cody Nickson and Jessica Graf; Season 31 (Reality Showdown), 2019: Colin Guinn and Christie Woods; Season 32, 2020: Will Jardell and James Wallington; Season 33, Winter 2022: Kim and Penn Holderness; Season 34, Fall 2022: Derek Xiao and Claire Rehfuss; Season 35, 2023: Greg and John Franklin; Season 36, 2024: Ricky Rotandi and Cesar Aldrete; Season 37 (Season of Surprises), Spring 2025: Carson McCalley and Jack Dodge; Season 38 (European Adventure), Fall 2025: Jas and Jag Bains; Season 39, 2026: Current season	Phil Keoghan	US$1,000,000 (Note: Season 21 featured the Double Your Money prize for the winners of the first leg, enabling them to win a US$2 million grand prize should they win the race.)
Vietnam	Cuộc đua kỳ thú The Amazing Race Vietnam	VTV3 (1–2, 4, 6); VTV6 (3, 5); VTV9 (5)	Season 1, 2012: Saetti Baggio and Thành Phúc; Season 2 (Celebrity Edition), 2013: Trần Thị Thu Hiền and Diệp Lâm Anh; Season 3 (Celebrity Edition), 2014: Hương Giang and Criss Lai; Season 4 (Celebrities vs. Fans), 2015: Trần Ngọc Anh and Đỗ Nhật Anh; Season 5 (All-Stars), 2016: Đinh Tiến Đạt and Lincoln Thúc Lĩnh; Season 6 (Celebrity Edition), 2019: Đặng Thị Lệ Hằng and H'Hen Niê	Dustin Nguyen (1); Huy Khánh (2–3, 5); Phan Anh (4); Song Luân (6); Hương Giang (6)	300,000,000₫

== Other media ==
=== Video games ===
A video game based on this reality show was developed by Ludia and published by Ubisoft for the Wii. It was released on November 2, 2010, in North America.

The game features many countries previously visited on real races, as well as some new ones like Venezuela. Host Phil Keoghan provided voice-acting throughout the entire game.

Players customize their own characters and can race against other, pre-made characters. These existing teams are showcased in the opening, which closely mirrors the actual show's opening (including the use of the same music). However, when playing the actual game, no-one, not even the player, is referred to by name. Instead, teams are differentiated by color (ex. team yellow).

The rules of the race are fairly similar to the actual race. Teams receive money, fly to a location and complete various tasks (which were represented by a large collection of minigames). The last team to arrive is eliminated, unless they are saved by a non-elimination leg, in which the penalty is the team loses all their money they saved up to that point (unlike the show during seasons 5–9, the teams are still given money at the start of the next leg). However, all teams leave the Pit Stop at the same time.

Some clues had changes to their rules: while the Detour and Roadblock retain their rules, there is no limit on individual Roadblocks. Fast Forwards appear in the race, but they are not optional, and the team that completes it the fastest gets a two-hour time credit. The Intersection marker was also present, however, the rules were changed to a task that all teams complete, similar to an additional task on the real race. The Yield, U-Turn, Speed Bump, and Express Pass are not featured in this game.

As an added bonus, completing various tasks and doing certain objectives in the game will unlock "video files." These are selected clips from the actual American TV show; usually featuring notable clips selected from the first 15 seasons, such as extremely dramatic moments (examples are Uchenna & Joyce could not pay their taxi driver at the final Pit Stop and Chris & Alex making the closest finish in The Amazing Race 2) or funny moments (such as when Fran & Barry kept walking past a clue that was within arm's length). The clips appear exactly as they did on TV, except that all logos are pixelated, even those that went uncensored on TV.

Ludia and Ubisoft also made a version of the game for the iPhone, iPod Touch and iPad.

=== Parodies ===
In 2015, a Canadian animated Amazing Race parody program titled The Ridonculous Race aired on Teletoon and Cartoon Network. The show itself is a spin-off the Total Drama series (which is, in turn, a parody of other reality shows, predominantly Survivor). The animated show features 18 teams of two who will compete in a race around the world for C$1,000,000. The show is hosted by Don, who is modelled after The Amazing Race US host, Phil Keoghan. The teams race to "Don Boxes" to receive their next "travel tip", which will instruct the teams to complete challenges and go to other locations. Like The Amazing Race, there are a variety of challenge types. There are "either or"; in which the teams are given a choice of two choices (like a Detour), a "botch or watch"; which only one member of the team can complete the task (like a Roadblock), and "all-ins"; in which both members must complete the given task. At the end of each episode, there is a "Chill Zone" which the teams may rest until the next episode. Teams check into the "chill zones" by stepping on the "carpet of completion". The last team to set foot on the carpet may be eliminated from the race. The first team to reach the final "chill zone" will win C$1,000,000.

In the adult sitcom show American Dad!, there is an episode called "The Bitchin Race", where the show's characters compete in a reality show that resembles The Amazing Race. The episode also featured Phil Keoghan portraying the host of the show himself.

== See also ==
- City Chase
- Expedition Impossible (TV series)
- The Global Scavenger Hunt – International travel adventure competition
- Jet Lag: The Game – Travel competition web series
- Lost (2001 TV series) – Reality television series
- Peking Express – Reality game show
- Race Across the World – British television series
- Race Around the World – Australian travel-documentary TV series
- Race the World – Chinese television series
- Race to the Center of the Earth – American reality television show
- Shanghai Rush
