= List of The Amazing Race: China Rush contestants =

This is a list of contestants who have appeared on the television series, The Amazing Race: China Rush. Contestants with a pre-existing relationship form a team and race across China against other teams to claim a trip around the world. In total, 42 contestants have appeared in the series.

== Contestants ==
The presented information was accurate at the time of filming.

Name	Age	Hometown	Season	Finish
Paul Lebeneiyo	27	Kenya	Season 1	10th
Francis Merinyi	31	Kenya	Season 1	10th
Miguel Villaneuva	27	Mexico	Season 1	9th
Hector Valenzuela	31	Mexico	Season 1	9th
Janis Vaisla†	40	Latvia	Season 1	8th
Aleksandra Kurusova	24	Latvia	Season 1	8th
Bonnie Wisnewski	54	United States	Season 1	7th
Melanie "Mel" Plumi	54	Arizona, United States	Season 1	7th
Sean Slaughter		United States	Season 1	6th
Amy Bromstead		United States	Season 1	6th
Sarah Edson	24	England, UK	Season 1	5th
Molly Fitzpatrick	34	United States	Season 1	5th
Lisa Chiang		United States	Season 1	4th
Karen Spencer		Canada	Season 1	4th
Deepak Noutiyal	29	India	Season 1	3rd
Naresh Ludhani	30	India	Season 1	3rd
Richard "Rick" Liston	25	Australia	Season 1	2nd
Joshua "Josh" Ogilvie	29	Australia	Season 1	2nd
Charlie Gale	26	Australia	Season 1	1st
Rachel Chen	25	United States	Season 1	1st
Paul Hayes	28	Canada	Season 2	11th
Nash	37	Ghana	Season 2	11th
A Lai Dongmei	47	Yinchuan, China	Season 2	10th
Wang "Jackie" Jieqi	23	Yinchuan, China	Season 2	10th
"Xiao Long" Shu Dalong	36	Shanghai, China	Season 2	9th
Lv Meng	36	Shanghai, China	Season 2	9th
Summer Xia	24	Wenzhou, China	Season 2	8th
Eachan Zhou	25	Wenzhou, China	Season 2	8th
Rhett Farber	52	United States	Season 2	7th
Howard "Howie" Snyder	49	United States	Season 2	7th
Elena Luk'Yanenko	28	Ukraine	Season 2	6th
Tameka Small	28	United Kingdom	Season 2	6th
Jiang "Mary" Zhijie	22	Nanjing, China	Season 2	5th
Jiang "Cecilia" Xinyao	20	Nanjing, China	Season 2	5th
Matthew "Matt" Waddick	28	New Zealand	Season 2	4th
Kylie Ann Chapman	26	Australia	Season 2	4th
Sun Bin	25	Shanghai, China	Season 2	3rd
Hao Fei'er	26	Shanghai, China	Season 2	3rd
Simon Chen	33	Los Angeles, United States	Season 2	2nd
Katherine Wang	24	Hunan, China	Season 2	2nd
Lily Li	29	California, United States	Season 2	1st
Jan Hopper	26	Germany	Season 2	1st
Hao Weiru "Jiajia"	30	Chengdu, China	Season 3	11th
Rob Biggs	42	Canada	Season 3	11th
Nick Black	30	Scotland, United Kingdom	Season 3	10th
Brandon Lee	27	Boston, Massachusetts, United States	Season 3	10th
Yu Ping (Carl)	46	Shanghai, China	Season 3	9th
Yu Chenjing (Linda)	22	Shanghai, China	Season 3	9th
Ju Xiangcheng (Xiao Bing)	30	Liaoning, China	Season 3	8th
Sun Huailong (Xiao Bang)	22	Liaoning, China	Season 3	8th
Henry Su	33	New Jersey, United States	Season 3	7th
Jennifer Su	32	Pennsylvania, United States	Season 3	7th
Tang Khai Shing	25	Penang, Malaysia	Season 3	6th
Tang Khai Sheng	25	Penang, Malaysia	Season 3	6th
Janelle Loh	21	Sydney, Australia	Season 3	5th
Karin von Essen	23	Stockholm, Sweden	Season 3	5th
Li Yang	27	Dalian, China	Season 3	4th
Zhang Yelin	27	Dalian, China	Season 3	4th
Ryan Burke	26	New York City, United States	Season 3	3rd
Charlie Melvin	24	California, United States	Season 3	3rd
Tong "Christine" Yinen	23	Taipei, Taiwan	Season 3	2nd
Zhao "Steven" Ruiriao	24	Taipei, Taiwan	Season 3	2nd
Lei Sheng	40	Xi'an, China	Season 3	1st
Liu Weiwei	30	Shandong, China	Season 3	1st
