= The Amazing Race: China Rush 2 =

Season of television series

- Season 2
- Presented by: Allan Wu
- No. of teams: 11
- Winners: Lily Li & Jan Höpper
- No. of legs: 11
- No. of episodes: 12

Release
- Original network: ICS; Dragon TV
- Original release: August 7 – October 23, 2011

Additional information
- Filming dates: May 13 – June 7, 2011

Series chronology
- ← Previous; Season 1 Next → Season 3

The Amazing Race: China Rush 2 (Chinese: 极速前进：冲刺！中国; pinyin: Jísù Qiánjìn: Chōngcì! Zhōngguó) is the second season of The Amazing Race: China Rush, a Chinese reality competition show based on the American series The Amazing Race. It featured 11 teams of two, each with a pre-existing relationship, in a race across 11 cities in China to win a trip to Hoh Xil Natural Reserve and a trip around the world worth 400,000CN¥ (US$62,000).

The Chinese TV network International Channel Shanghai aired the season in English, and Dragon TV in Chinese. It premiered on August 7, 2011 and ended on October 23, 2011.

American and German dating couple Lily Li and Jan Höpper were the winners of this season.

== Production ==
=== Development and filming ===
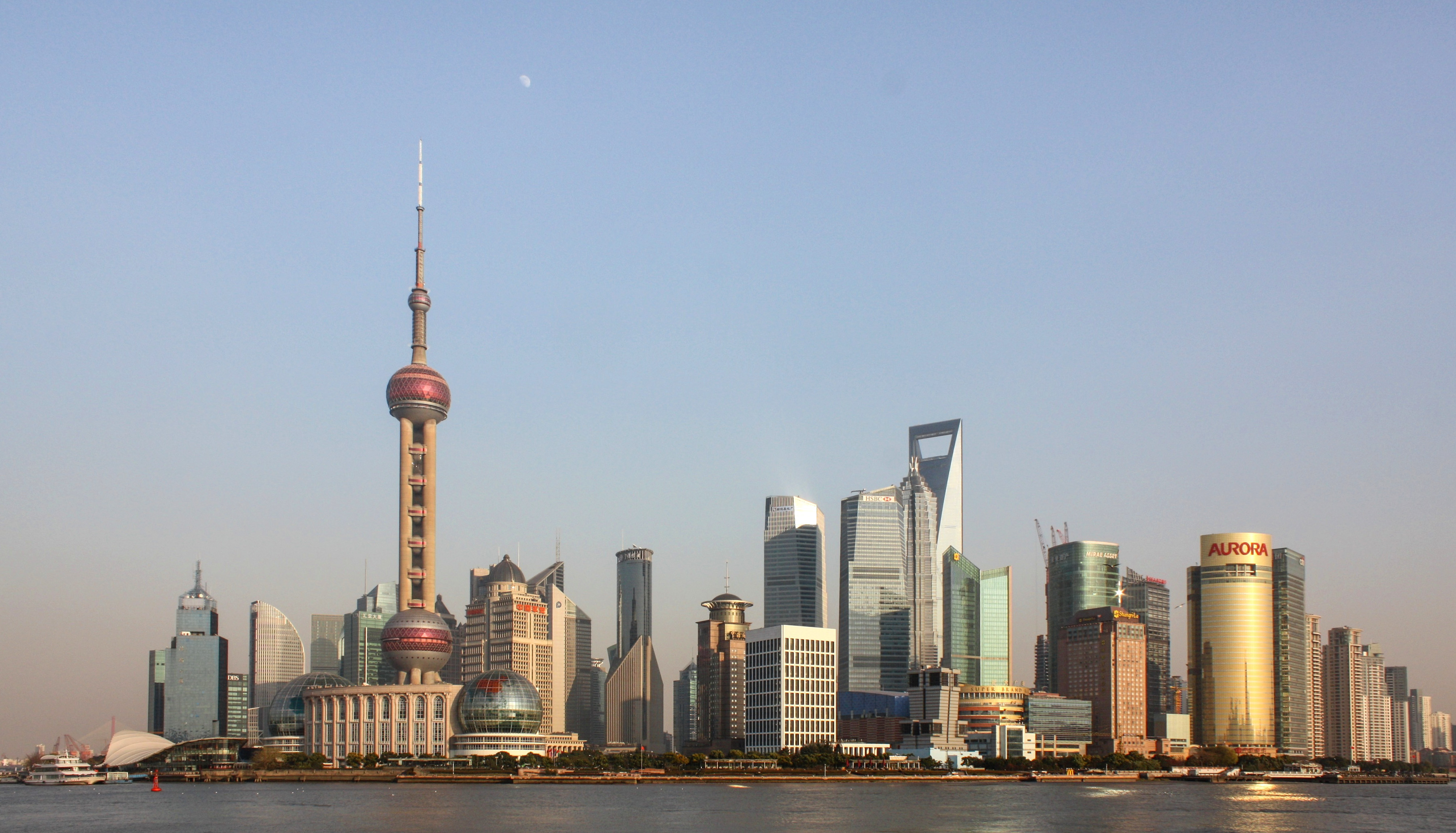
The Starting Line of this edition of The Amazing Race: China Rush was located at Lujiazui Park in Shanghai.

In early 2011, it was announced that Dragon TV would broadcast a Chinese-language version of the show.

The Intersection was introduced in this season. It has two teams complete further tasks together until a clue indicates that they are no longer Intersected. There was also a Double U-Turn, which allowed two teams to exercise their U-Turn power. This season also introduced the double-length leg, which featured a Virtual Pit Stop and aired as two episodes, with each episode having a Detour and a Roadblock.

Filming for this season began on May 13, 2011 and ended on June 7, 2011.

=== Casting ===
Applications were accepted from March 4 to April 10, 2011.

== Cast ==
In contrast to the previous season which featured foreign and ex-pat contestants, this season has a mixed cast between native born Chinese and foreigners living in China. All the contestants communicated using a mixture of Chinese and English.

Contestants	Age	Relationship	Hometown	Status
Paul Hayes (保罗)	28	High School Teachers	Canada	Eliminated 1st (in Wuzhen, Zhejiang)
Nash (纳什)	37	High School Teachers	Ghana	Eliminated 1st (in Wuzhen, Zhejiang)
A Lai Dongmei (来冬梅)	47	Mother & Son	Yinchuan, Ningxia	Eliminated 2nd (in Wuyuan, Jiangxi)
Jackie Wang (王劼奇)	23	Mother & Son	Yinchuan, Ningxia	Eliminated 2nd (in Wuyuan, Jiangxi)
Xiao Long (小龙)	36	Wushu Coaches	Shanghai	Eliminated 3rd (in Ningde, Fujian)
Lv Meng (吕猛)	36	Wushu Coaches	Shanghai	Eliminated 3rd (in Ningde, Fujian)
Summer Xia (夏洲)	24	Newly Dating/Childhood Friends	Wenzhou, Zhejiang	Withdrew (in Danxia Shan, Guangdong)
Eachen Zhou (周一成)	25	Newly Dating/Childhood Friends	Wenzhou, Zhejiang	Withdrew (in Danxia Shan, Guangdong)
Rhett Farber (瑞特)	52	30 Year China Veterans	Florida, United States	Eliminated 5th (in Wulong County, Chongqing)
Howie Snyder (豪伊)	49	30 Year China Veterans	New York, United States	Eliminated 5th (in Wulong County, Chongqing)
Elena Luk'Yanenko (伊莲娜)	28	Fitness Fanatics/Competitive Dancers	Kiev, Ukraine	Eliminated 6th (in Lijiang, Yunnan)
Tameka Small (特玛卡)	28	Fitness Fanatics/Competitive Dancers	London, United Kingdom	Eliminated 6th (in Lijiang, Yunnan)
Mary Zhijie (蒋志洁)	22	Cousins/Students in Canada	Nanjing, Jiangsu	Eliminated 7th (in Datong County, Qinghai)
Cecilia Xinyao (蒋欣瑶)	20	Cousins/Students in Canada	Nanjing, Jiangsu	Eliminated 7th (in Datong County, Qinghai)
Matt Waddick (马修)	28	Friends/International Students in China	New Zealand	Eliminated 8th (in Penglai, Shandong)
Kylie Chapman (凯莉)	26	Friends/International Students in China	Perth, Australia	Eliminated 8th (in Penglai, Shandong)
Sun Bin (孙斌)	25	Recording Artists	Shanghai	Third Place
Hao Fei'er (郝菲尔)	26	Recording Artists	Shanghai	Third Place
Simon Chen (西蒙)	33	Dating Long Distance	Los Angeles, California	Second Place
Katherine Wang (王薇毅)	24	Dating Long Distance	Hunan	Second Place
Lily Li (莉莉)	29	Dating Couple	California	Winners
Jan Höpper (杨)	26	Dating Couple	Germany	Winners

== Results ==
The following teams participated in the season, with their relationships at the time of filming. Note this table does not necessarily reflect all content broadcast on television due to inclusion or exclusion of some data. Placements are listed in finishing order.

Team	Position (by leg)												Roadblocks performed
Team	1	2	3	4	5	6	7	8	9^{5}		10	11	Roadblocks performed
Lily & Jan	3rd	5th	7th	3rd	2nd>	1st	5th⊂	1st	2nd	1st	2nd~	1st	Lily 6, Jan 6
Simon & Katherine	6th	8th	6th	6th^{3}	5th	6th	3rd	5th	4th	3rd	3rd+	2nd	Simon 6, Katherine 6
Sun Bin & Hao Fei'er	8th	9th^{1}	1st>	1st	1st	2nd	2nd⋑	2nd	3rd	2nd	1st~	3rd	Sun Bin 6, Hao Fei'er 6
Matt & Kylie	10th	7th	2nd	4th^{3}	4th	5th	4th	3rd	1st	4th	4th+		Matt 6, Kylie 5
Mary & Cecilia	1st	1st	8th<	7th^{3}	6th<	4th	1st⊃	4th	5th	5th			Mary 5, Cecilia 4
Elena & Tameka	7th	2nd	3rd	2nd	3rd	3rd	6th⋐	6th					Elena 3, Tameka 4
Rhett & Howie	5th	6th	4th	5th^{3}	7th	7th							Rhett 2, Howie 3
Summer & Eachen	4th	4th	5th	8th⊃^{4}									Summer 0, Eachen 3
Xiao Long & Lv Meng	2nd	3rd	9th										Xiao Long 1, Lv Meng 1
A Lai & Jackie	9th	10th^{2}											A Lai 0, Jackie 0^{3}
Paul & Nash	11th												Paul 0, Nash 0

Key

- A red team placement indicates that the team was eliminated.
- An underlined blue team placement indicates that the team came in last on a non-elimination leg and had to perform a Speed Bump task in the following leg.
- A yellow > indicates that the team chose to use the Yield; < indicates the team who received it.
- A brown ⊃ or a cyan ⋑ indicate that the team chose to use one of the two U-Turns in a Double U-Turn; ⊂ or ⋐ indicate the team who received it.
- Italicized results indicate the position of the team at the midpoint of a two-episode leg.
- Matching colored symbols (orange + and magenta ~) indicate teams who worked together during part of the leg as a result of an Intersection.

Notes

1. Sun Bin & Hao Fei'er were unable to complete the secret code task and elected to take a 2-hour penalty.
2. A Lai & Jackie were unable to complete the puzzle task or the secret code task and elected to take two 2-hour penalties. When they arrived at the Lying Dragon Valley after all the other teams had checked in, Allan came to the location to inform them of their elimination.
3. Matthew, Rhett, Simon and Mary were unable to complete the Roadblock and elected to take a 2-hour penalty.
4. Summer & Eachen used their U-Turn power on Sun Bin & Hao Fei'er, however they had already passed the U-Turn point and were therefore unaffected by it. Later, they arrived 3rd at the Pit Stop, but announced to Allan at the Pit Stop to withdraw from the show due to family reasons.
5. Leg 9 was a double-length leg. It featured a Virtual Pit Stop, and had two Detours and two Roadblocks shown over two episodes.

== Prizes ==
The prize for each leg is awarded to the first place team for that leg.

- Leg 1 – A three-day, two-night trip for two to Qiandao Lake, Hangzhou courtesy of Hilton Hotels & Resorts.
- Leg 2 – A three-day, two-night trip for two to Sanya, Hainan courtesy of Hilton Hotels & Resorts.
- Leg 3 – A three-day, two-night trip for two to Hong Kong staying at the Hong Kong Disneyland Hotel and tickets to Hong Kong Disneyland.
- Leg 4 – A four-day, three-night trip for two to Kuala Lumpur, Malaysia courtesy of The Otomotif College.
- Leg 5 – A seven-day trip for two to Bangkok, Thailand courtesy of China Eastern Airlines.
- Leg 6 – A trip for two to Bali, Indonesia courtesy of Garuda Indonesia.
- Leg 7 – A seven-day trip for two to Dubai, United Arab Emirates courtesy of China Eastern Airlines.
- Leg 8 – A seven-day trip of two to California courtesy of China Eastern Airlines.
- Leg 9 – A three-day, two-night trip for two to Hawaii courtesy of Japan Airlines with a stay at the Hilton Hawaiian Village.
- Leg 10 – A five-day, four-night trip for two to Maldives courtesy of Hilton Hotels & Resorts.
- Leg 11 – A trip to Hoh Xil Natural Reserve and a trip around the world worth ¥400,000 ($55,662).

== Race summary ==
Route Map.

Destinations	Air travel Rail travel Water travel Bus travel Helicopter travel Bicycle travel Gondola travel
Route Markers	Detour Roadblock Yield Intersection U-Turn Speed Bump Pit Stop

=== Leg 1 (Shanghai → Zhejiang) ===
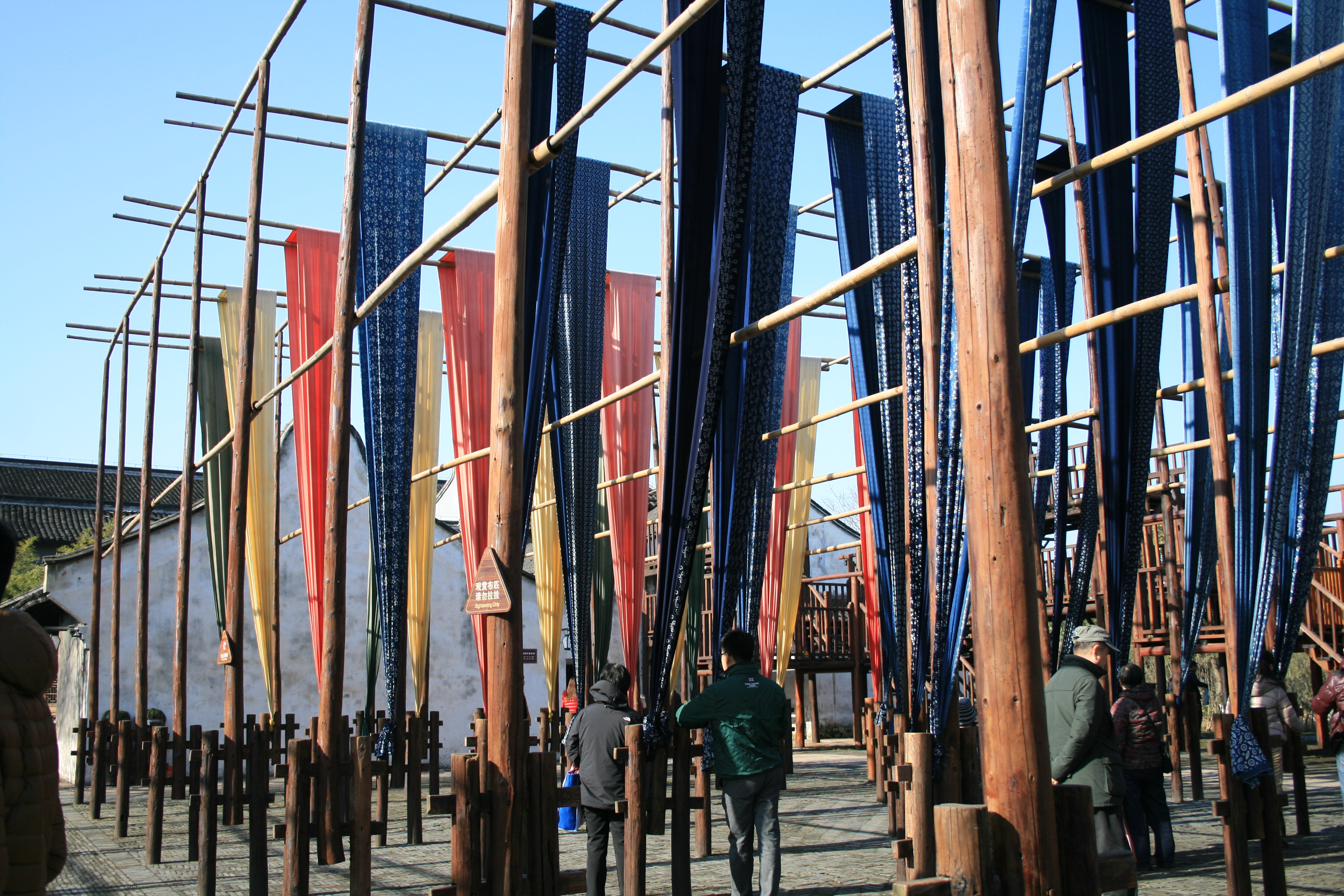
One Detour option in Wuzhen, Zhejiang required teams to hang calico fabric onto a drying rack.

Airdate: August 7, 2011

- Shanghai, China (Lujiazui Park) (Starting Line)
- Shanghai (Shanghai Hongqiao Railway Station) to Wuzhen, Zhejiang (Wuzhen Railway Station)
- Wuzhen (Wuzhen Monument)
- Wuzhen (Xi Qing Tang Wedding Hall Museum)
- Wuzhen (West Wuzhen Post Office)
- Wuzhen (Foliage Dai Ning Workshop or Syria Chang Sauces)
- Wuzhen (Wenchang Pavilion)
- Wuzhen (An Du Fang Floating Market)
- Wuzhen (East Wuzhen Pharmacy)
- Wuzhen (Jiang Zhe Fen Fu)

In this season's first Detour, teams had to choose between Hang Out or Dig In. In Hang out, teams went to Foliage Dai Ning Workshop, where teams had to successfully hang four different blue calico patterns in traditional bamboo pole drying rack to receive their next clue. In Dig In, teams went to Syria Chang Sauces, where the owner would present a "Wuzhen Tong Bao" coin and teams would have to search marked vats filled with bean sauce to find a matching coin to receive their next clue.

In an unaired Roadblock, one team member had to sit on a floating tub in the lake and catch five fishes to receive their next clue.

Additional tasks

- In Xi Qing Tang Wedding Hall Museum, teams had to take a red envelope and bring it to a bride to receive their next clue.
- At the East Wuzhen Pharmacy, teams had to search 120 drawers for word cards imprinted with the words "Jiang", "Zhe", "Fen" and "Fu" that they had to arrange to figure out the name of the Pit Stop.

=== Leg 2 (Zhejiang → Jiangxi) ===
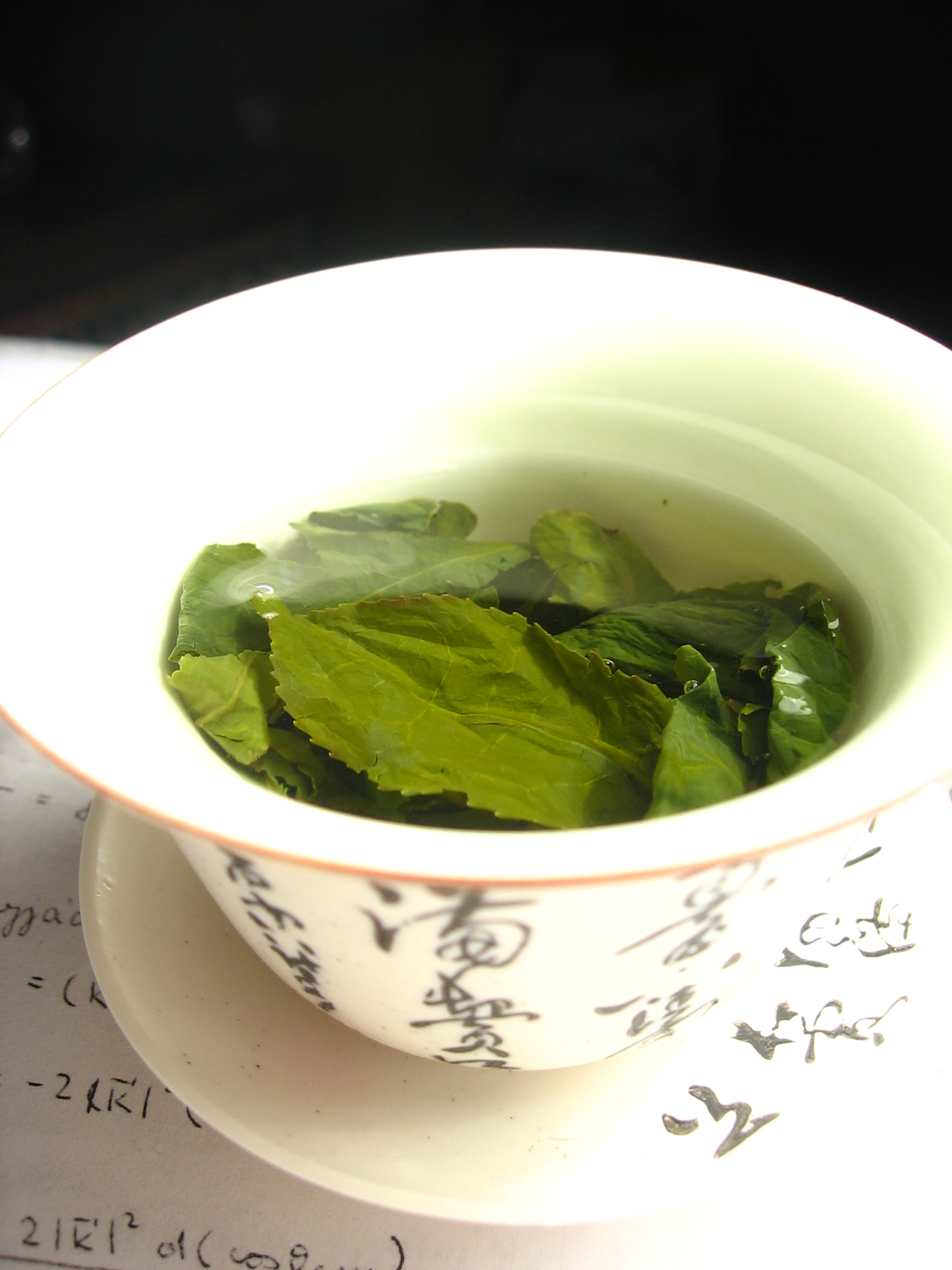
The Detour choices in Wuyuan, Jiangxi, both paid tributes to harvesting tea leaves.

Airdate: August 14, 2011

- Wuzhen to Wuyuan, Jiangxi
- Wuyuan (Jiangwan Village)
- Wuyuan (Xintian Village)
- Wuyuan (Yantian Village – Millennium Guzheng)
- Wuyuan (Lying Dragon Valley)
- Wuyuan (Rainbow Bridge)

This leg's Detour was a choice between Hunters or Gatherers, both of which took place in nearby tea fields. In Hunters, teams had to search the entire field for a tiny, golden tea leaf, which they could exchange for their next clue. In Gatherers, teams went to a different tea field and had to harvest 150 grams of tea leaves to receive their next clue.

In this season's first aired Roadblock, one team member had to climb up a waterfall cascading over a rock face to receive their next clue.

Additional tasks

- At Jiangwan Village, teams had to complete a large puzzle to receive their next clue.
- At the Millennium Guzheng, teams were told to search the rooms for a numerical code. Teams had to figure out that this code could be found by looking at all of the stopped clocks in the rooms (9:28) which corresponded to their code (0928).

=== Leg 3 (Jiangxi → Fujian) ===
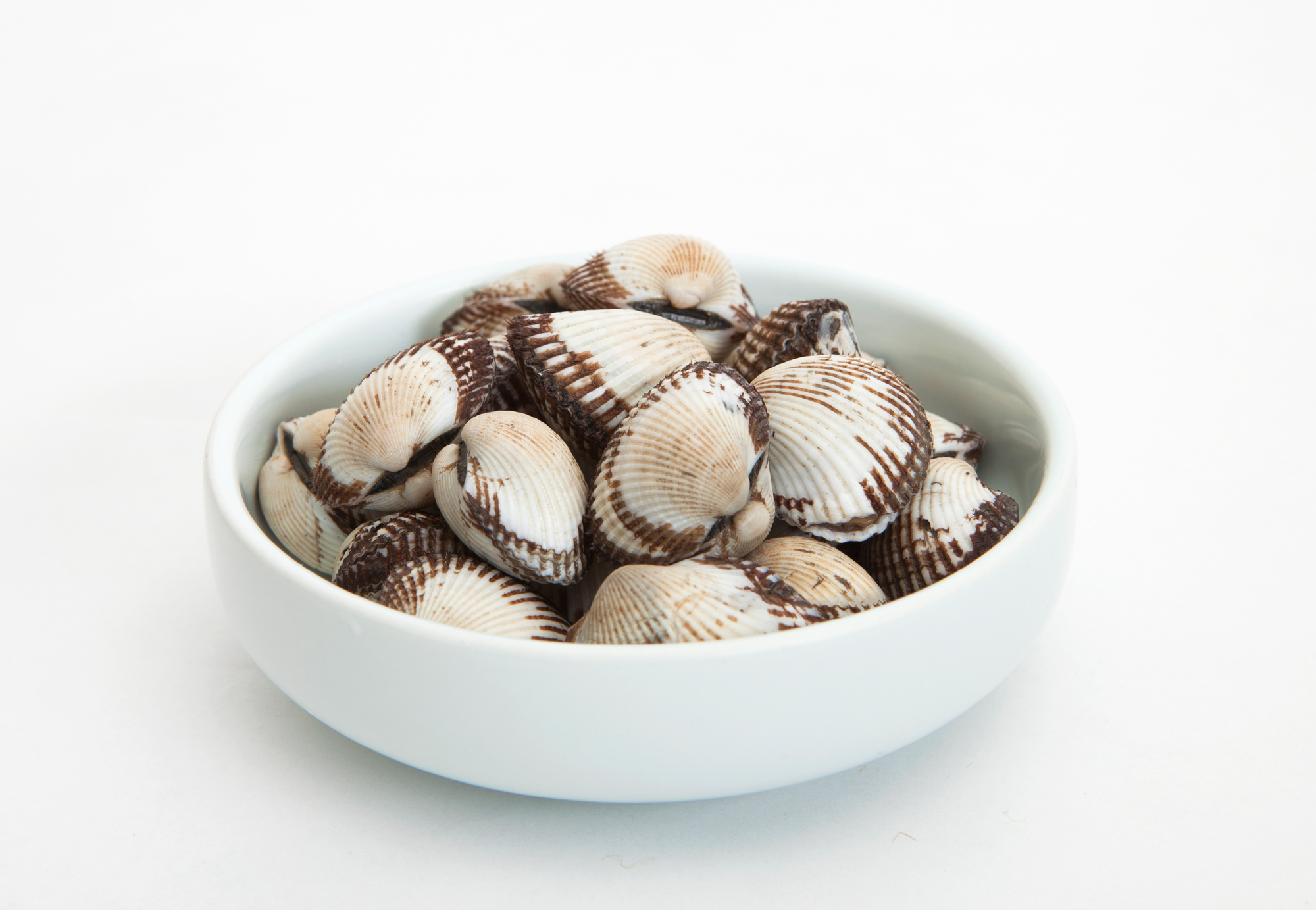
For the Roadblock, racers had to finish a serving of blood clams.

Airdate: August 21, 2011

- Wuyuan to Jingdezhen
- Jingdezhen to Ningde, Fujian
- Ningde (Niulanggang Beach)
- Ningde (Niulanggang Beach to Downtown Ningde)
- Ningde (North Bank Park)
- Ningde (Mindong Hotel)
- Ningde (She Palace Museum)

This leg's Detour was a choice between Wheels or Peels. In Wheels, teams had to push a large water tricycle into the water, and then pedal it out to a large inflatable ball. They would then ride back to shore on a banana boat with their ball and, once on shore, could open the ball to find their next clue. In Peels, teams had to ride a Segway across a marked course to a dig site on the beach, where they would have to dig up six different kinds of fruits and exchange them for their next clue.

In this leg's Roadblock, one team member had to eat a large serving of blood clams and three glasses of baijiu to receive their next clue.

Additional task

- At North Bank Park, teams had to ride paddle boats out into the lake and find one of nine clues floating on the water.

=== Leg 4 (Fujian → Guangdong) ===
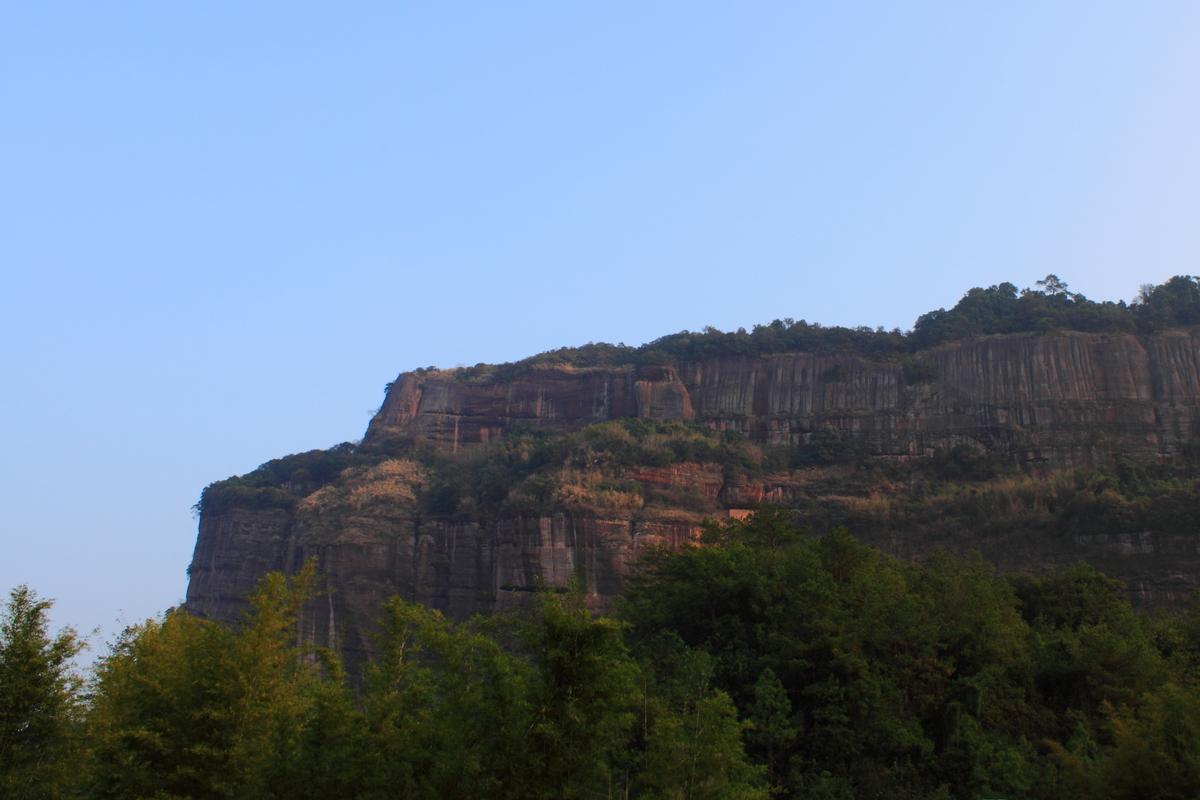
In Guangdong, teams visited Danxia Shan.

Airdate: August 28, 2011

- Ningde to Guangzhou, Guangdong (Guangzhou Baiyun International Airport)
- Guangzhou (Guangzhou Railway Station) to Shaoguan (Shaoguan Railway Station)
- Danxia Shan (Lao Shen Men Gate)
- Danxia Shan (Xuanjiyuan Taoist Temple)
- Danxia Shan (Xuan Ji Tai Platform)
- Danxia Shan (Xiafu Village)
- Danxia Shan (Shao Yin Ting Pavilion)

In this leg's Roadblock, one team member had to climb down a rocky cliff using a rope ladder, retrieve their clue from the tops of the trees at the bottom, and then climb back up the rope ladder to complete the task.

This leg's Detour was a choice between Chasing Chickens or Dancing Lions. In Chasing Chickens, teams had to travel to a chicken farm, catch 10 chickens, and place them in baskets to receive their next clue. In Dancing Lion, teams had to search the town for a lion head and then search inside specified buildings for the matching tail. They would then have to learn and perform a traditional Chinese dragon dance to receive their next clue.

Additional task

- At the Xuanjiyuan Taoist Temple, teams had to transport 35 kilograms (77 lb) of rice up an extremely steep path to receive their clue from the head priest.

=== Leg 5 (Guangdong → Hunan) ===
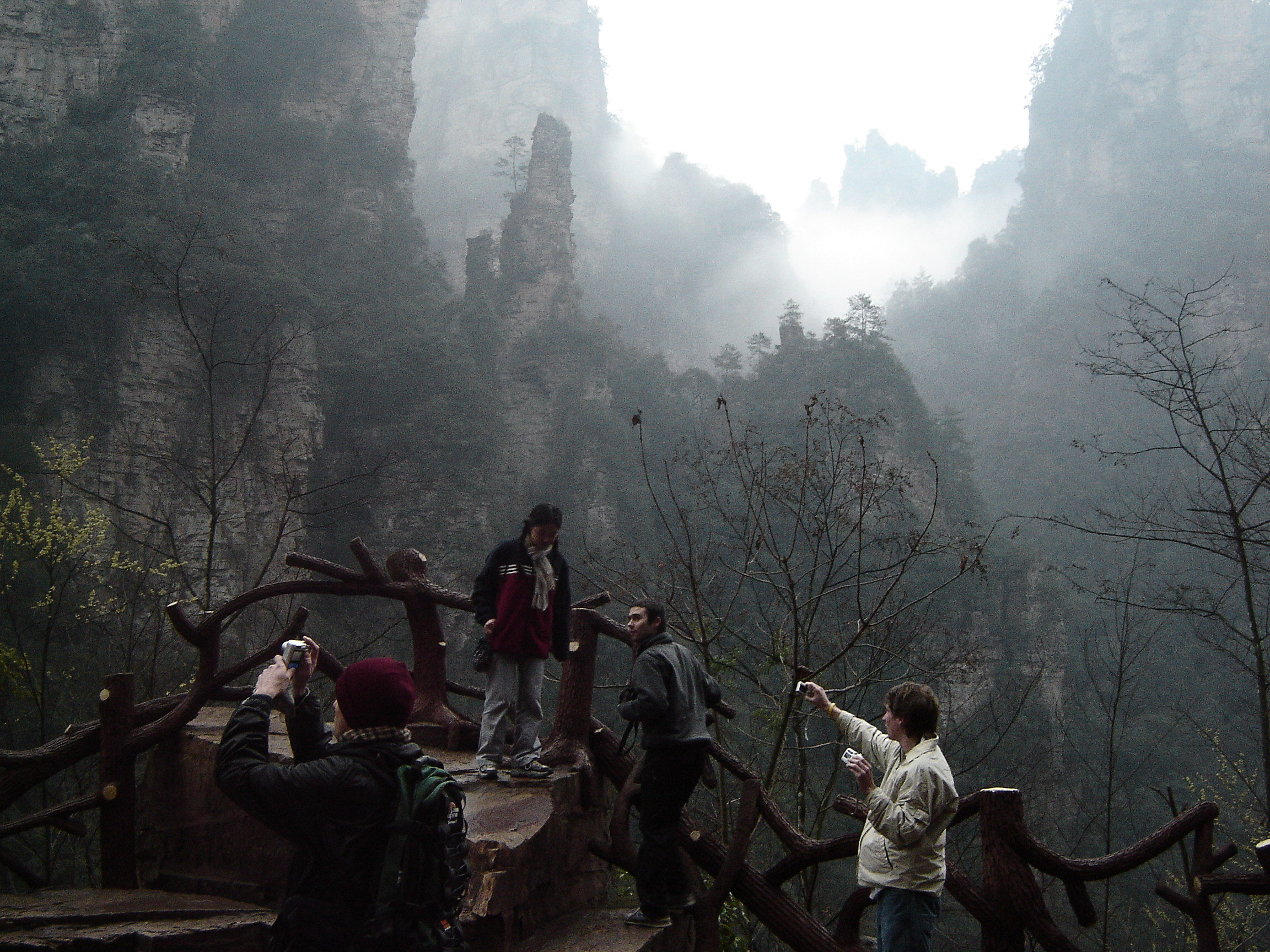
Zhangjiajie National Forest Park in Hunan was the Roadblock location for Leg 5.

Airdate: September 4, 2011

- Guangdong (Guangzhou Baiyun International Airport) to Zhangjiajie, Hunan (Zhangjiajie Hehua Airport)
- Zhangjiajie (Bus Station) to Wulingyuan (Yellow Dragon Cave)
- Wulingyuan (Xiang Xi Farmhouse)
- Wulingyuan (Xiang Xi Theatre)
- Wulingyuan (Xiang Xi Gallery or Baofeng Lake)
- Wulingyuan (Wulingyuan Scenic Mountain)
- Wulingyuan (Tujia Village in Zhangjiajie National Forest Park)
- Wulingyuan (Lianxin Bridge on Hallelujah Mountain)
- Wulingyuan (Bailong Elevator to Bai Long Square)

This leg's Detour was a choice between Look or Listen (Presented to Chinese-speaking contestants and viewers as Name that View or Name that Tune). In Look, teams travelled to the Xiang Xi Gallery and had to correctly match ten pictures of the famous mountains surrounding Zhangjiajie with their names. If they could get all 10 correct, they would receive their next clue, although there were more than 10 pictures. In Listen, teams travelled to Baofeng Lake and searched the lake on boat for a female singer who was singing four distinct songs, with the corresponding names being displayed. They then had to find a marked cave where a male singer would be singing one of these songs. If they could correctly identify it, they would receive their next clue. If not, they would be required to return to the female singer before being allowed to guess again.

In this leg's Roadblock, one team member had to chop onions, garlic and spices in order to make a famous Hunan spice mixture and receive their next clue.

Additional task

- At Xiang Xi Farmhouse, teams had to use hacksaws to cut a bamboo pole filled with Baijiu into four pieces and fill a pot with the baijiu.

=== Leg 6 (Hunan → Chongqing) ===
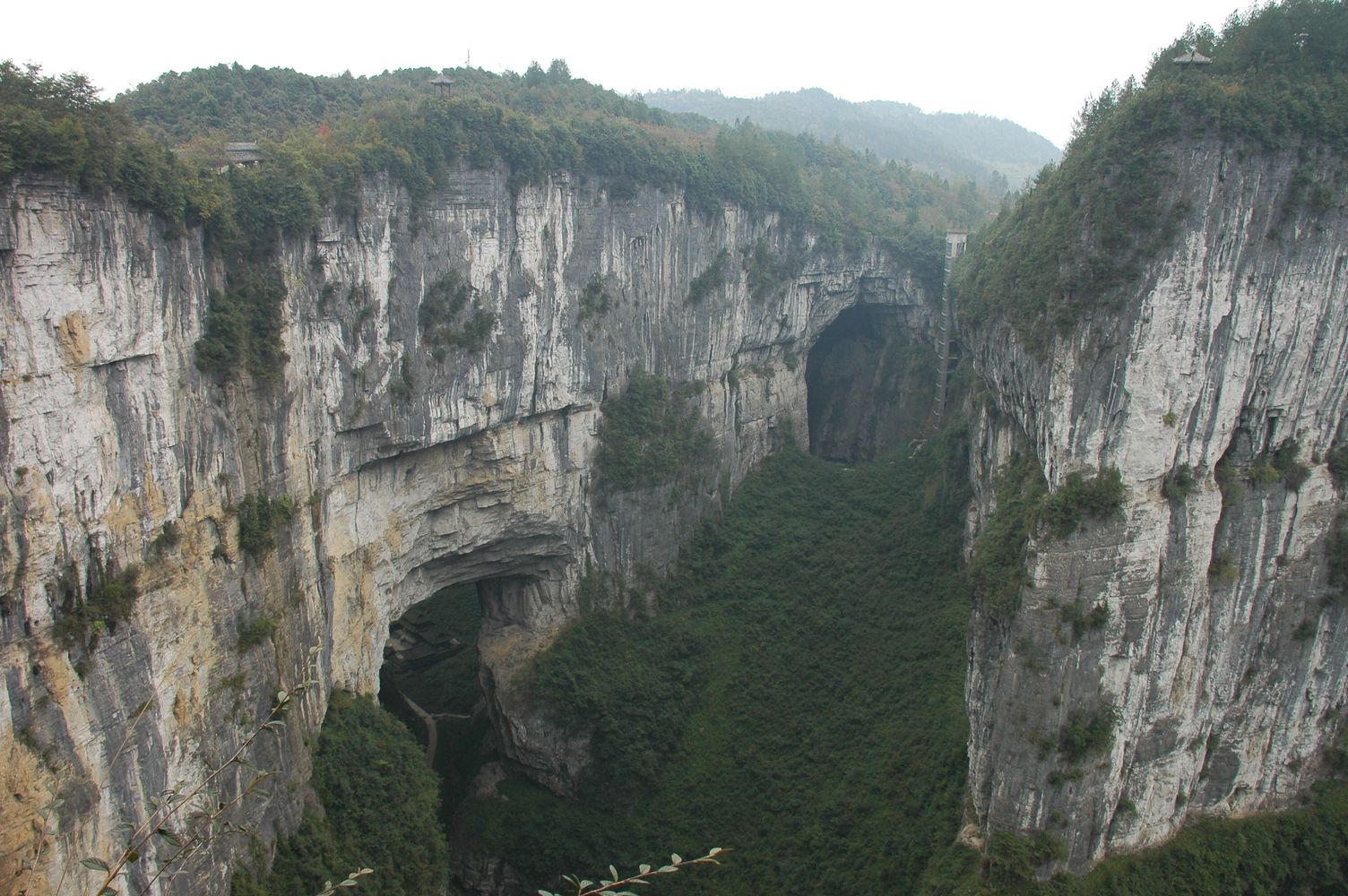
Racers had to rappel down one of the cliffs in Chongqing's Wulong County in this leg's Roadblock.

Airdate: September 11, 2011

- Zhangjiajie (Zhangjiajie Hehua Airport) to Chongqing (Chongqing Jiangbei International Airport)
- Chongqing to Wulong County
- Wulong County (Wujiang Bridge)
- Wulong County (Zhang's Lamb Hot Pot Restaurant)
- Shuanghe Town (Highland Vegetable Farm)
- Wulong County (Fairy Mountain)
- Wulong County (Three Natural Bridges)
- Wulong County (People Square)
- Wulong County (Century Square)

For their Speed Bump, Howie & Rhett had to irrigate a cabbage patch by hand, once they had successfully sprinkled two buckets of water in their designated cabbage patch they can continue racing.

This leg's Detour was a choice between Roll It or Ride It. In Roll It, teams had to count all the tires along the hill, once their answer was correct they had to get into a Zorb and go down the hill to receive their next clue. In Ride It, teams had to drive a go-kart in a two lap circuit (one lap each member) in less than 7.30 minutes to receive their next clue. If the team couldn't complete the task in the allotted time, they would have to wash the go-kart before trying again.

In this leg's Roadblock, one team member had to rappel down a 90-meter cliff face-down to retrieve their next clue.

Additional tasks

- In the Hot Pot Restaurant, teams had to search for 1 marked bottled of Snow beer among 600 others, then eat 10 plates of lamb to receive their next clue.
- At the farm, teams had to prepare breakfast for the pigs by graining dry corn and mixing it with vegetables in a traditional way. Once the pigs eat their feed, teams would receive the next clue.

=== Leg 7 (Chongqing → Yunnan) ===
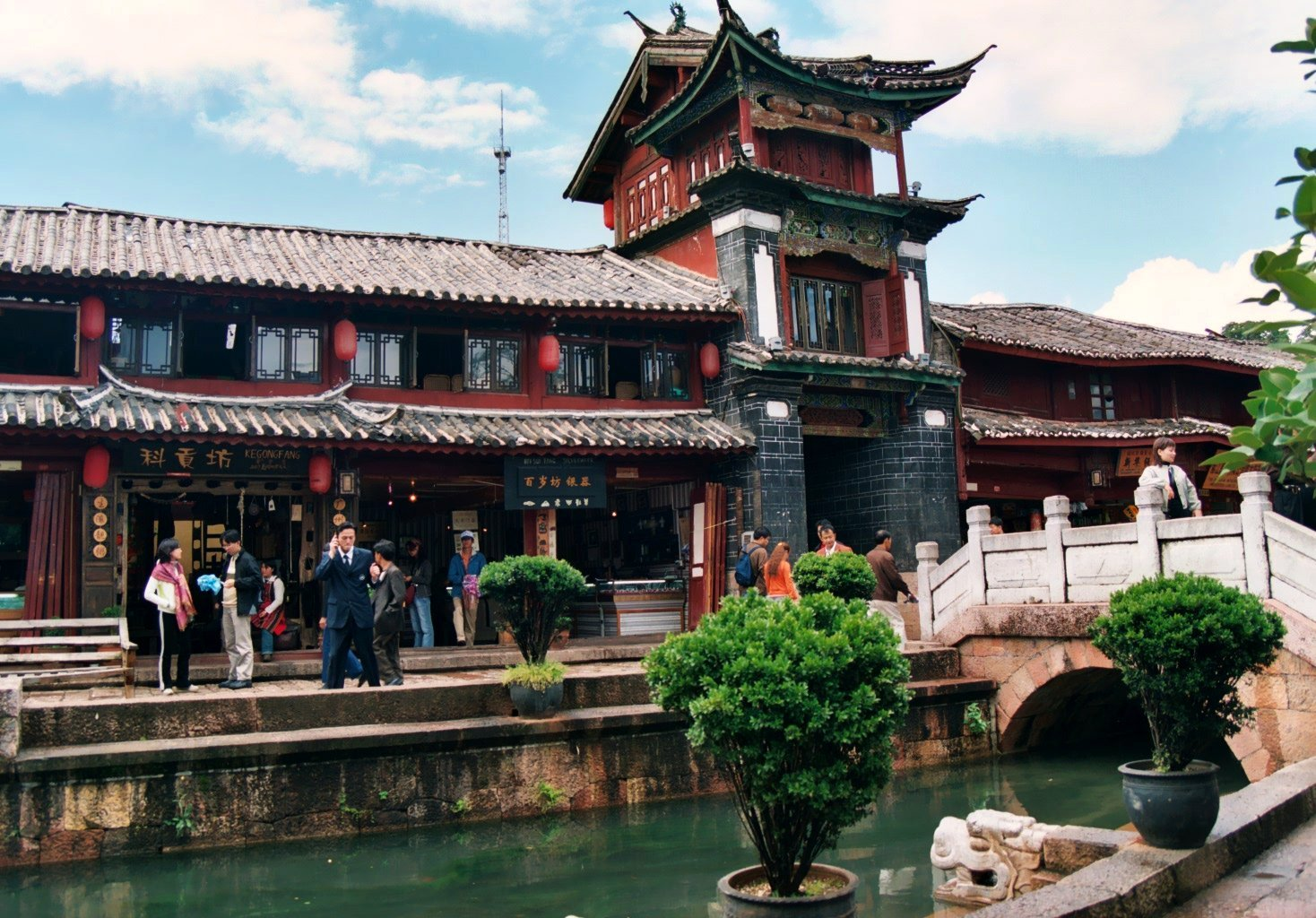
Teams traveled to Dayan in Lijiang, Yunnan on this leg.

Airdate: September 18, 2011

- Wulong County (Furong Cave)
- Chongqing (Chongqing Jiangbei International Airport) to Lijiang, Yunnan (Lijiang Airport)
- Lijiang (Lijiang Airport to Zhao Xiong Ge Station)
- Lijiang (Naxi Restaurant)
- Lijiang (Chama Yingbin Square)
- Lijiang (Feihua Chushui)
- Lijiang (Entrance)
- Lijiang (Mufu Palace)

In this leg's Roadblock, one team member had to zipline across the river near Wulong. On the other side, they would find two women in traditional clothing singing a song. They would then have to zipline back, where they would find many symbols on a board. They would have to correctly identify which symbols were on the dresses worn by the women. Once they identified both correct symbols, they would be able to sign up for a departure time from the Lijiang Airport; otherwise, they had to zipline back and try again.

This leg's Detour was a choice between Communicate or Renovate. in Communicate, one team member would view some pictographic symbols from the Naxi language. The other team member would have to draw these symbols on a chalkboard, following only verbal clues from their partner. In Renovate, teams would have to paint and dress a horse carriage to match a given example.

Additional task

- At the Naxi restaurant, both team members had to properly cook two Baba cakes to receive their next clue.

=== Leg 8 (Yunnan) ===
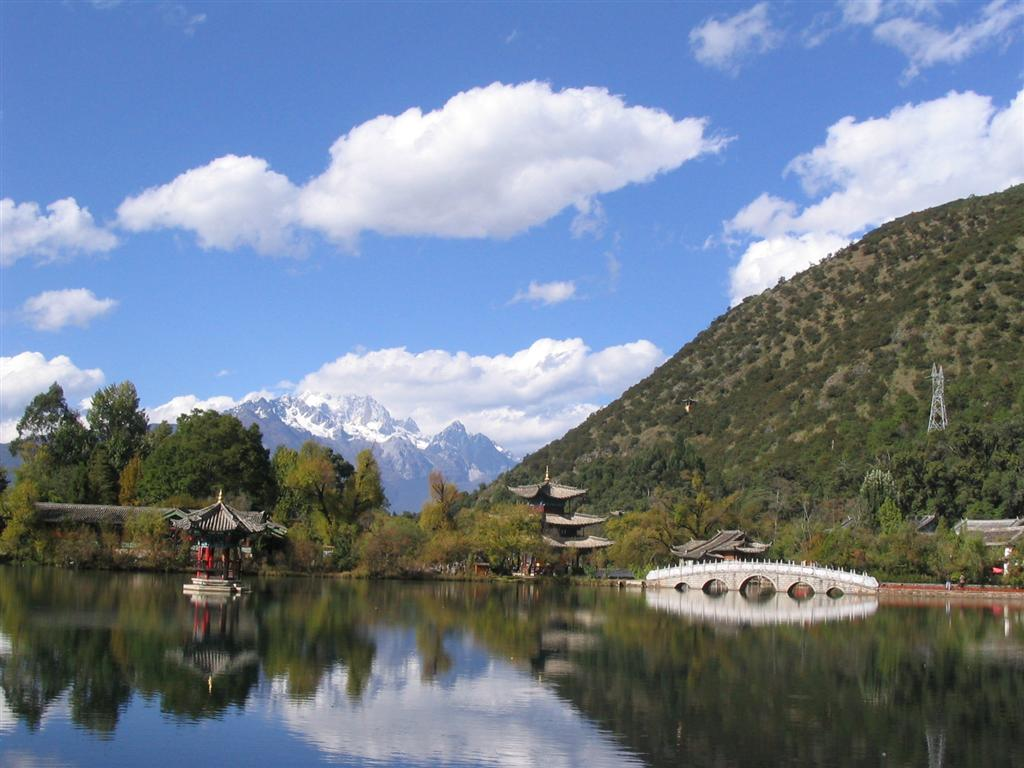
Teams ended the eighth leg of the race at Lijiang's Black Dragon Pool.

Airdate: September 25, 2011

- Lijiang (Guang Bi Lou)
- Lijiang (Jade Dragon Snow Mountain – 4506 Feet Elevation Marker)
- Lijiang (Dongba Valley)
- Lijiang (Hua Ma Alley)
- Lijiang (Black Dragon Pool)

In this leg's Roadblock, one team member had to climb a steep, snowy hill while carrying both team members' backpacks and a race flag, while at 4,506 metres (14,783 ft) above sea level.

For their Speed Bump, Tameka & Elena had to make a set of traditional pastry snacks before they could continue racing.

This leg's Detour was a choice between On the Mark or Through the Park. In On the Mark, teams went to an archery field where they would shoot a bow and arrow at a target. After achieving 100 points, they would receive their next clue. In Through the Park, teams had to deliver three items (A large pile of firewood, two heavy wine jugs, and two drums) through the village. After delivering the items undamaged, they would receive their next clue.

Additional task

- The clue received at Guang Bi Lou simply contained the number "4506". Teams needed to figure out that this referred to one of the elevation markers on the Jade Dragon Snow Mountain.

=== Leg 9 (Yunnan → Qinghai) ===
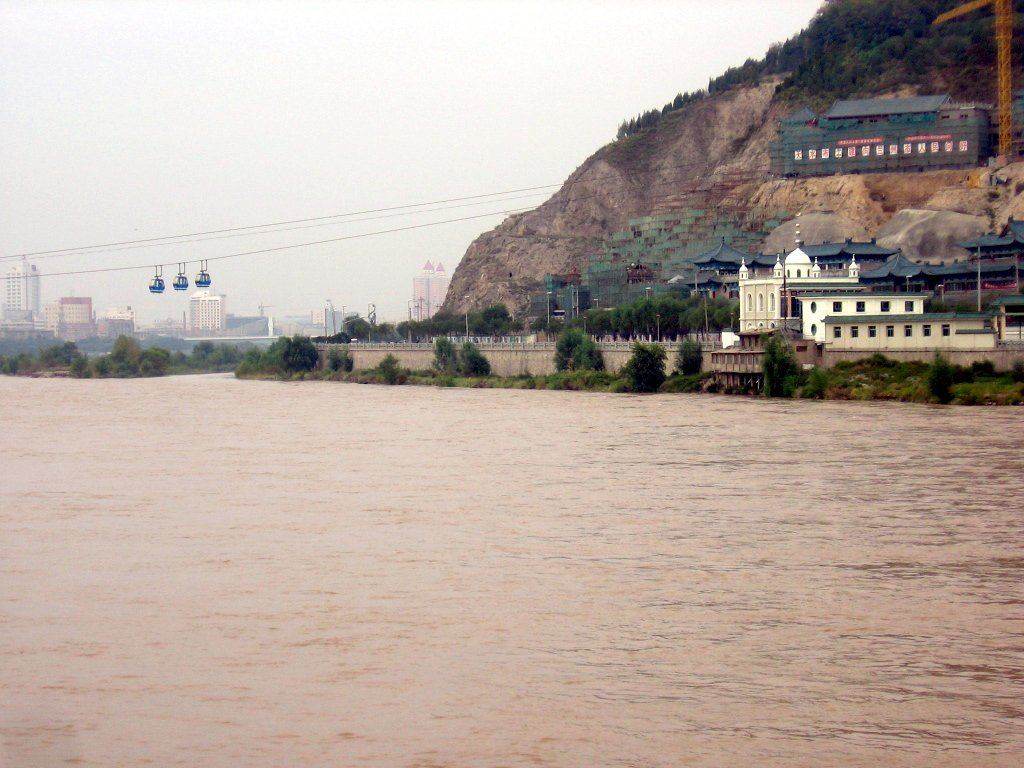
In Xunhua, Qinghai, teams rafted down the Yellow River in the first half of Leg 9.

Airdate: October 2, 2011

- Lijiang (Lijiang Airport) to Xining, Qinghai (Xining Caojiabu Airport)
- Xining to Xunhua
- Xunhua (Yijia Minority Products)
- Xunhua (Yellow River – Jishi Bridge)
- Xunhua (San Lan Ba Hai Village)
- Xunhua (Yimahai Village)
- Xunhua (Wendu Monastery)
- Xunhua (Camel Spring Mosque)

This leg's first Detour was a choice between Sun or Bun. In Sun, teams had to properly assemble a solar powered cooking device to receive their next clue. In Bun, teams had to correctly make 20 traditional flower-shaped buns to receive their next clue.

In this leg's first Roadblock, one team member had to utilize a pulley system to pull themselves and a basket of supplies across the Yellow River in a box. They then had to climb up to a monastery and deliver these supplies before pulling themselves back across.

Additional tasks

- At Yijia Minority Products, teams had to collect 40 identical traditional Muslim hats from a pile and then trim the loose threads. They then had to fold and package these 40 hats. Teams would then receive departure times for the morning.
- At the Yellow River, teams had to inflate lamb hides rafts and then travel across the raging rapids to the other side.

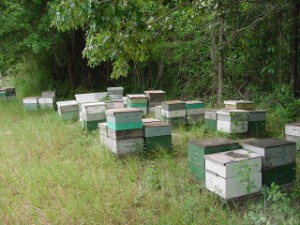
Teams performed the Spin It part of the Detour in an apiary.

Airdate: October 9, 2011

- Xunhua to Xining to Datong County
- Datong County (Yao Zi Gou)
- Dongxiazhen (Dong Xia Zhen Market)
- Datong County (Guang Hui Temple)
- Datong County (Duo Long Village)
- Datong County (Ming Dynasty Era Great Wall)
- Datong County (Lao Ye Mountain)

In this leg's second Roadblock, one team member had to correctly piece together six traditional Chinese shadow puppets to receive their next clue.

This leg's second Detour was a choice between Spin It or Stack It. In Spin It, teams travelled to an apiary and choose a beehive. They then had to remove the bees from the honeycomb and place them into spinning drums that are used to extract honey. Once they had extracted a full jar of honey, they would receive their next clue. In Stack It, teams had to tie up five bales of hay, carry them across a river, and then properly stack them to receive their next clue.

Additional tasks

- At the Dong Xia Zhen Market, teams were given a pot of Eight Treasures Tea to taste and observe. They then had to correctly gather the eight ingredients used in making the tea. If teams made three incorrect guesses, they would receive a 15-minute time penalty.
- At the Guang Hui Temple, teams had to light six candles, three small and three large, and properly greet a monk to get their clue.

=== Leg 10 (Qinghai → Shandong) ===
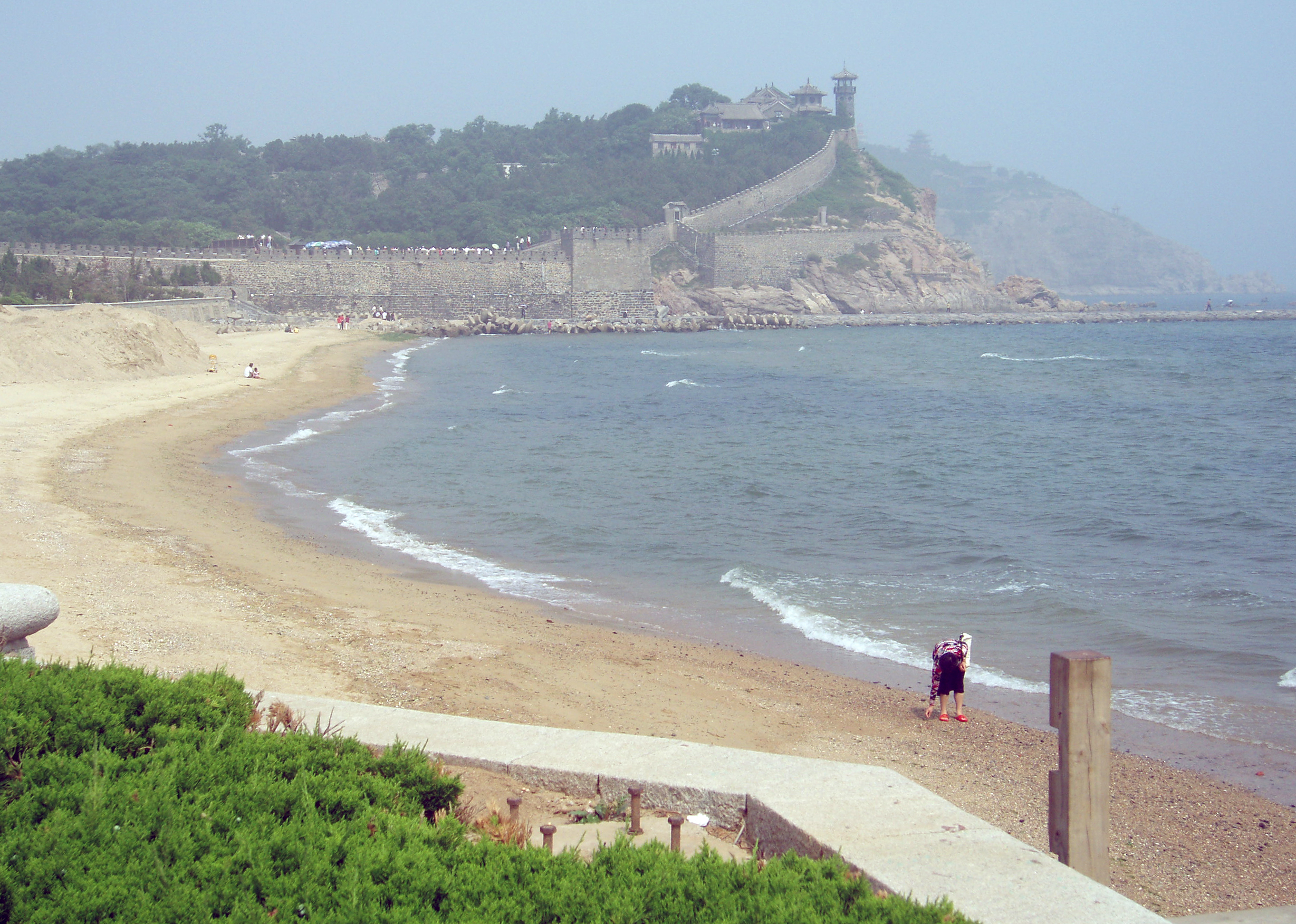
Teams travelled to Penglai in Yantai, Shandong on the penultimate leg.

Airdate: October 16, 2011

- Xining (Xining Caojiabu Airport) to Yantai, Shandong (Yantai International Airport)
- Penglai (Statue of the Eight Immortals)
- Penglai (Hai Xian Ju Restaurant)
- Penglai (Yu Jia Le Fishing Dock)
- Penglai (Chateau Junding)
- Penglai (San Xian Shan Park)
- Penglai (Bei Wo Du Residence)
- Penglai (Fortified Harbor of Water City)

At the Intersection, teams had to join with one other team to complete tasks and make decisions together until further notice. In this special Roadblock, one team member from each of the Intersected teams had to ride a fishing boat out to a collection of buoys. They then had to lift whatever the buoys were attached to onto the boat. Once they found their next clue which was hidden inside of a string of fishing nets, they could return to the shore, where they would no longer be Intersected.

This leg's Detour was a choice between Count the Vines or Find the Wine. In Count the Vines, teams went out into the fields of the winery where they had to count the number of grapevines growing. In Find the Wine, teams entered the wine cellar, where they found a collection of wine glasses that represented a numerical code. They had to use this example to decipher a code represented by a second collection of wine glasses. If they got the correct number, they had to find the corresponding barrel and then roll it out of the basement to get their next clue.

Additional tasks

- At Hai Xian Ju Restaurant, each team member had to eat two sea cucumbers to receive their next clue.
- At San Xian Shan Park, teams had to watch a musical performance involving many instruments including bells. They then had fifteen minutes to practice the bells portion of the song before performing it. If teams performed correctly they would receive their next clue, but if they made a mistake or performed out of sync, they would have to wait out a fifteen-minute penalty before making another attempt.

=== Leg 11 (Shandong → Shanghai) ===
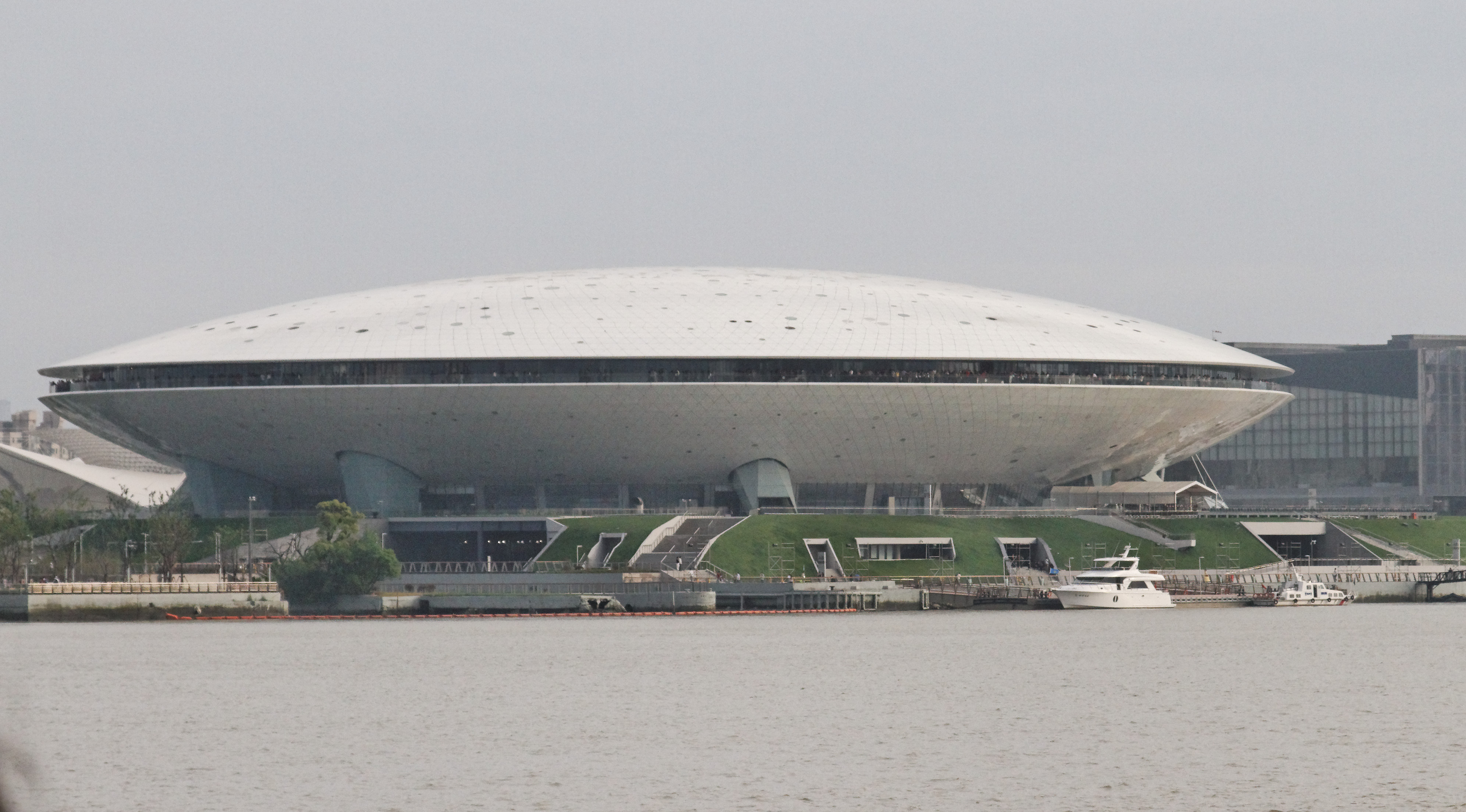
The Mercedes-Benz Arena in Shanghai was the Finish Line of the second season of The Amazing Race: China Rush.

Airdate: October 23, 2011

- Yantai (Yantai International Airport) to Shanghai (Shanghai Hongqiao International Airport)
- Shanghai (Hilton Hongqiao Hotel)
- Shanghai (Xintiandi – South Huang Pi Road)
- Shanghai (Xintiandi – Huangpi Lu)
- Shanghai (Baoshan – Snow Beer Factory)
- Shanghai (1984 Bookstore)
- Shanghai (Red Town Sculpture Park)
- Shanghai (Mercedes-Benz Arena)

This season's final Detour was a choice between Spin It or Snap It. In Spin It, teams had to spin a kongju across a marked course without letting it drop and while keeping it spinning the whole time. In Snap It, teams received a photograph of a tourist. They then had to find this tourist and direct them to the location in the photograph. They then had to recreate the photograph exactly and take a new photo to receive their next clue.

In this season's final Roadblock, one team member had to search among pictures and names attached to sculptures in the sculpture park to find the eleven pictures of the Pit Stop locations they visited, as well as a picture to go with each.

Leg	Pit Stop	Location
1	Jiang Zhe Fen Fu	Wuzhen
2	Rainbow Bridge	Wuyuan
3	She Palace Museum	Ningde
4	Shao Yin Ting Pavilion	Danxiashan
5	Bai Long Square	Zhangjiajie
6	Century Square	Wulong
7	Mufu Palace	Lijiang
8	Black Dragon Pool	Lijiang
9	Camel Spring Mosque	Xunhua
9	Lao Ye Mountain	Datong
10	Fortified Harbor of Water City	Penglai

Once the pictures and names of the cities were correctly attached, they would receive their final clue.

Additional tasks

- At the Hilton Hongqiao, teams were given fifteen minutes to observe a properly made room. They then had to properly dress their own room to receive their next clue.
- At the Snow Beer Factory, teams had to operate a forklift and transfer six large stacks of boxes of beer to a designated area. Each team member had to do an equal amount of work as the other. If any boxes of beer fell, they would be forced to take a fifteen-minute time penalty. Once the stacks were transferred and the forklift returned to its original position, teams received their next clue.
