= Fly Films =

Chinese film production company

FLY FILMS
- Website: http://www.flyfilms.com.cn

FLY Films is a video production and film production company based in Shanghai, China. The company was started in 2004 by Eric Ransdell and Norman Wong.

Services range from pre-production, production, and post-production to crewing, directing, and producing. Their clients include many of the world's largest television networks and multinational corporations. FLY Films works with many foreign broadcasters, such as STAR World, BBC, MTV, ABC (USA), and ESPN, as well as Chinese networks, such as Shanghai Media Group and CCTV News, to coordinate and crew their entertainment productions in China. FLY Films also specializes in corporate work that is produced to an international broadcast standard, clients include Alfred Dunhill, Starbucks, Johnnie Walker, Nike, Intel, Shangri-La Hotels and Resorts, and General Motors.

== Television Productions ==
FLY Films produced its first reality TV series, Shanghai Rush for International Channel Shanghai (ICS) in 2009. As a part of Shanghai Media Group's programming for Shanghai Expo 2010, Shanghai Rush was the flagship production for the Spring 2009 schedule of their ICS TV station.

FLY Films handled post production for International Channel Shanghai (ICS)'s ten-episode documentary series, China Visionaries. Under Shanghai Media Group, China Visionaries was produced in celebration of China's 60th anniversary. The series featured renowned international figures such as Henry Kissinger, Bob Hawke, Jean-Pierre Raffarin, Yasuhiro Nakasone, and Juan Antonio Samaranch.

FLY Films produced the second season of Asia Uncut in 2010. With its move from Singapore to Shanghai, FLY Films was responsible for the re-development of the show. Asia Uncut is the only late-night talk show featuring both Asian and Western celebrities, musical guests, and comedians to be taped in China and broadcast throughout Asia and the Middle East. Celebrity guests of the show's second season included Jackie Chan, Edison Chen, Leehom Wang, Ed Norton, Aaron Eckhart, Jamie-Lynn Sigler, Anoushka Shankar, Lee Jung Hyun, Donnie Yen, and Tom Arnold. The show also featured up and coming musical guests from China such as New Pants, Carsick Cars, Casino Demon, and Cold Fairyland. The English-language show was taped before a live audience in Shanghai and was broadcast on STAR World to an estimated 120 million people in 53 countries.

FLY Films' following reality TV series was The Amazing Race: China Rush. The TV network, International Channel Shanghai (ICS), acquired the rights to produce a Chinese version of the American franchise, The Amazing Race. With Allan Wu as the host, the show features 10 teams of two, each with a pre-existing relationship, in a race across 10 cities in China to win a world tour provided by Travel Zen. Filming took place between May and June 2010. The Amazing Race: China Rush premiered on August 8, 2010 on ICS and aired globally on CCTV News (CCTV-9) on August 14, 2010.
