= Encounter (game) =

International network of active urban games

Project logo

Encounter is an international network of active urban games. Also known as "Схватка" (reads as 'skhvatka') (translated "Combat" from Russian) – the game that gave birth to this project.

== Project history ==
The game rules applied today were developed by Belarusian Ivan Masliukov in 2001 as part of the Skhvatka project. Ivan Masliukov was supporting the game at his own expense before the project was ceased in the end of 2001.

At the beginning of spring 2002 Ivan started seeking for donors to continue the project. Minsk internet provider "BelInfonet" company was there to sponsor the game. By June 2002 "Skhvatka" games were resumed.

Disputes over the project arose between Ivan Masliukov and "BelInfonet".

First I held games on my own then in cooperation with "Belinfonet". Unfortunately, we had a clash of opinions. Then I decided to start my own brand Encounter that included Skhvatka (Combat) and several other games.

Developers of such games like "Hunt", "Skhvatka", and "Dozor" copied the main idea of Encounter, slightly altering the format and task management. As a result, Ivan separated from partnership with BelInfonet and created an independent Encounter project. A noteworthy fact is both parties of the conflict registered their game name trademarks "Skhvatka" and "Encounter" in 2002 and 2004 correspondingly.

Konstantin Glushakov, who developed "Skhvatka" game application platform from scratch, headed the group of programmers who are currently working on the Encounter platform design and development.

After creation of the Encounter project Skvatka game, being one of several game formats, was called Combat.

Having gone through many stages of development, through criticism and disagreements with BelInfonet, the games labeled Encounter get held in many countries of the world: Russia, Ukraine, Belarus, Lithuania, Latvia, Moldova, Estonia, Georgia, Kazakhstan, Kyrgyzstan, Azerbaijan, United States, Czech Republic, Poland, France, Germany, Israel and many other. Currently the project involves tens of thousands of participants.

In 2008 several new urban game formats were added to the Combat and Brainstorming. These were PhotoHunt, PhotoExtreme, WetWars, GeoCaching, Caching and Points. In 2009 VideoHunt appeared as a new game among other ones.

The same very year the first book about urban games called "Encounter. Night Extreme" written by Ivan Maslukov was issued.

The filming and processing of documentary about urban games "Encounter: lust for life" over by December 2009.

== Stats ==
The service platform of Encounter makes it possible to hold various urban games within a city or a country. The project covers over 230 cities in Russia and CIS, France and Germany.

Since the beginning of the project more than 8000 games have been held with over 175 000 participants, project managers say.

In 2006 Russian magazine "Kommersant" wrote:

Encounter is played by about 300 thousand people in 11 countries – the organizers say. The estimation of the audience is probably overrated –for instance there are hardly 300 participants of the game in Moscow, according to Sergey Logvinov, local Encounter manager. Nevertheless, this number is significant.

At the end of 2009 the administration of the game network published Encounter annual report:

- a new game format Points was started and quickly gained popularity among participants (over 2000 games held)
- new game formats PhotoSearch and PhotoMuseum based on the PhotoExtreme application were started
- "Global live help" service launched
- game domains ranking system launched
- the first music video and documentary filmed
- new rewards and regulations for achieving them implemented
- the fourth All-Russian game was held in Moscow and the first All-Belarusian occurred in Minsk
- the first issue of General declaration appeared
- Encounter game network acted as a partner All-Russian educational forum "Seliger-2009"
- social move "Encounter for life" started up
- online store of Encounter accessories launched
- Encounter was invited to Sorbonne.

== Franchise ==
The territorial expansion of Encounter, like for many other projects, is carried out by means of franchising. Anyone interested can obtain the franchising sublicense to hold the games. The potential audience size doesn't matter, as well as the presence of similar or different games organizers in the region.

Having paid one-time fixed deposit, a registered user obtains owners rights to the third level domain name in en.cx zone. Then he can organize his own game in compliance with the project regulations. For each game held, the author has to transfer fixed sum to the project owners. This sum is determined by the game format (Combat, Brainstorming) and entry fees paid by participants. Organizer sets the rules for his games, specifies their format, timing and participants’ fees.

The team that first completes all game missions (levels) gets 50% of all the money collected; the rest goes to the organizer. The entry fee totals 40-$200, 15-20 teams generally participate in a game. The developers of the network receive fixed deposits for each game ($15 to $40 depending on game format) as a payment for using the service platform.

Most of the Encounter game organizers have other stable sources of income. Still they admit that racing and role-playing can be the main business activity for those who devote most of their time to it. The creator of Encounter Ivan Masliukov chose this option:

This is my job, my school, my university, my business – my life. Some are happy to help the project, some make money. The important thing is to do what you like.

The annual racing and night role-playing games market capacity in Moscow is estimated to be at least 6 million roubles, Masliukov says. And it tends to increase at a rate up to 250% per year.

The Encounter founder Ivan Maslukov extends urban games not only geographically by entering new regions but also by generating and bringing to life new ideas.

== Game formats ==
There are several types of missions, which can be played solo or in teams. Every team has to have a car to reach different locations, a cell phone or a laptop connected to Internet in order to receive mission tasks, flashlights (due to the fact that most of the games are held on Saturday nights) and a set of walkie-talkie to use at places where network signal is low.

The main goal of the game is to complete various missions in several locations sooner than the others. A team or a solo player to complete all given missions first wins the game. According to rules there is no strict sequence of missions, they are not limited in time or number. The organizers may determine all these parameters themselves. The similar game called Dozor.Classic in contrast, has strict limitations to each game. For example, there can only be 5 to 10 missions in a game, each mission is limited to 90 minutes and the hints are provided every 30 minutes with automatic mission switch.

== Awards ==
Since 2006 the Encounter administration has awarded participants for outstanding success in games or the project development. There are 6 types of awards: "For belief in future", "For contribution in project development", "For courage and braveness", "Champion", "Hyper-brain", "Green star".

Quotes from General declaration:

- The Encounter awards are gained by the participants for outstanding contribution in development of the project, for heroic acts, for winning local and international championships.
- The awards are established and produced by Encounter administration only. Production of fake awards is prohibited. Violators get banned from the game network.
- The awards are deputed to domain owners according to rating in domain bonus table.
- Domain owners have rights to determine the reasons for a participant or a team to be awarded (personal merits, 1st place in a local championship or a separate game).
- The network administration has the right to allocate awards for international games and competitions and also assign other reasons for awarding.

== Celebrities who participated or judged games ==
These are some of famous people who took part in Encounter game Ruslana, Alex Exler, Dmitry Puchkov, Ales Mukhin, Ville Haapasalo, KVN team Fyodor Dvinyatin, Yevgeni Grishkovetz, Boris Strugatsky, Diana Arbenina, Sergey Pimenov, Konstantin Rykov, Andrey Griboedov, Artur Sitdikov.

== Accidents ==
Night games are related with certain risks for participants. The organizers point them out in the rules of the game. Before the game every team captain hands in an agreement to the organizers. These agreements contain signatures of the participants who acknowledge and take the risks they may be subject to. The game is rather extreme, therefore players have to be utmost careful, cautious and attentive. The list of accidents that occurred during the Encounter games:

- On October 27, 2007, two cars collided on Novosibirsk – Kolyvan highway. There were Encounter players in one of the cars. A male, female and a child lost their lives. Six people hospitalized.
- A young man died early morning on May 2 to 3 2009 in the Stary Oskol city. He was hit by electricity at a railroad bridge.
- A young man fell off the roof of closed factory in Kemerovo on the May 2, 2009.
- Two participants suffocated inside an underground collector in Lipetsk on July 12, 2009

During 2008 and 2009 there were at least five deaths in the similar game Dozor.

== See also ==
- City Chase
- Geocaching
- Geohashing
- Letterboxing
- Location-based game
- Questing
- Treasure hunt (game)
