= Dozor =

Geolocation game

Dozor (Russian: Дозор, Watch) is an international codebreaking/geolocation game played at night in an urban environment.

== Rules ==
Dozor is an outdoor team game where players aim to complete mentally and physically challenging tasks as fast as possible. Teams consist of one or more "squads" - 2-5 field players sharing a car. Depending on rules and team strategy, a separate group of players gathered at common remote location may act as team "headquarters" - its functions range from solving the puzzles to directly coordinating "field" squads (i.e. providing addresses and driving directions). Two main game variations exist: "classic" version, highlighting the team synergy, requires 2-8 squads and at least one person as headquarters staff; "lite" version is centered on every player being in action and is played with one squad, no headquarters.

Game flow consists of several levels or "tasks" (original number, declared in rulebook, is 10 levels, however this may change from game to game depending on local rules and game master creativity). At the beginning of each level, team receives a puzzle of some kind. Solving this puzzle provides players with one or several locations in real world that field squads should drive to. Upon arrival to specified location, squad members look for suitable object (building, statue, tree, manhole - almost anything goes here) marked with a game-specific sign (usually letters/numbers/doodle painted with spray can) - the mini-quest of some kind takes place here. As this quest is being completed, the players gather "codes" - lines of digits and letters (i.e. 123D485R). In order to complete the task and advance to next level, team must send all the codes to game masters. Team that completes all the levels within the least time, wins. To balance the tasks, the time-out rule is implemented: if a team doesn't complete a level within given time (90 minutes; this default value may be changed depending on task complexity) - it advances to next level with a time penalty of 15 minutes (in addition to 90 minutes already spent on level). Global time limit - 8 to 12 hours for all levels - may be also present, depending on local rules. Bonus levels, which can be beaten independently of normal ones, and are rewarded with time deductions, may also be present as a part of game.

Puzzles within levels range in complexity with no real bounds existing. Logic puzzles, number and word plays, mini-games - anything goes here, as long as the answer is direct enough to point to exact location. Most game masters try to unite all puzzles and field tasks under the common theme special for the particular game: in this case the game may have a "legend" (short text/video to set the atmosphere) and "prequel" level (more complex level with relaxed time limit), which are made available several days before the game. Since most of puzzles are complex, hints are given at 30 and 60 minutes into each level. The second hint usually spells the exact field task location out.

Field mini-quests differ from task to task, but usually are the mix of the following sub-quests:

- pixelhunting. Codes, written using a marker paint, are scattered all over the location. Usual size of writing is 1–3 cm high and 4–15 cm wide, colors also may differ. Some codes require serious physical effort (e.g. climb 10 meters high using only indents in wall, reach roof of building with no ladder, etc.) to reach, some are simply hard to find (e.g. in a gap between bricks), some require non-standard thinking (e.g. code is stylized as a graffiti or written on a paper frozen into 20-cm thick ice covering all the floor). This kind of sub-quest is present in most levels, and is considered the routine.
- flashmob/agent. Code is given by game master representative upon completion of (usually) short and funny task, involving some kind of game or physical challenge. Sometimes players are required to perform strange-looking quests like entering a police station with their faces painted blue or singing pirate songs in the middle of a supermarket.
- puzzle. Code is obtained by solving a technical or logical puzzle. This includes scattering hints all over the location or simply disguising parts of code as normal real-world objects.

=== Variations ===
Originally, the game was designed for teams consisting of at least 10 players, who were divided into several squads. Game zone often included the whole city area of several hundreds square kilometers, so squads were located at different points in order to ensure quick response time. If level was located at north of city, squads from south were just standing by waiting for their teammates to finish. This meant that out of 10 levels, one squad could only be present at most 4-5 locations during the game, which caused some players to lose the interest. As an attempt to make the game more intense, and exclude full enjoyment into all levels, "lite" version was invented: designed for one squad per team, it ensured that everyone would be able to experience every level personally, without any sorts of standby. Overall, level composition rules stayed the same, however, some aspects were adapted

Rule	"Classic" version	"Lite" version
Default number of levels	10	6
Average gameplay time	7–9 hours	3–5 hours
Number of players	10-40	5 max.
Number of "field" squads	2-10	1
"Headquarters"	Recommended	Frowned upon
Level time limit	90 min.	60 min.
Average puzzle complexity	10-30 min.	1-10 min.
Puzzle hints	at 30 and 60 min.	at 20 and 40 min.
Average codes per "pixelhunting" level	8-12	3-8

== Deaths ==
Although organisers always designate danger zones and install warning signs, the negligence and carelessness of the participants in the game sometimes lead to accidents. Serious accidents include

- In April 2008 in Tula, a player was killed after falling 15–20 meters from a derelict concrete structure.
- In Ulyanovsk, on the night of 11 April 2009, a young man was electrocuted to death by an apparently abandoned, but actually working, electricity transformer box. The game organiser was put on trial for manslaughter, his lawyer blaming the local electricity company, as the substation appeared to be defunct.
- In June 2009 in Nizhny Novgorod, a player died after falling from the roof of an abandoned factory.
- In Lipetsk, in July 2009, firefighters in special breathing apparatus recovered the bodies of players about 400 meters from a hatch that was used by the game. The deaths were thought to have been caused by suffocation.
- On September 27, 2009 in Bryansk, a man was killed by an electric shock from a transformer box which held a search code.

== See also ==
- Encounter - rival franchise with similar format and rules
- Treasure hunt (game)
