= Nochnoy Dozor =

Nochnoy Dozor may refer to:

- Night Watch (Lukyanenko novel), 1998 opening of Sergei Lukyanenko's Watch fantasy tetralogy
- Night Watch (2004 film), Russian film based on Lukyanenko's novel
- Night Watch (video game), a 2005 video game based on the novel and the film
- Nochnoy Dozor (group), activist group in Estonia
- "Nochnoi Dozor", track by Powerwolf from the album Preachers of the Night

== See also ==
- Night Watch (disambiguation)
