= Doze =

Doze may refer to:

- To sleep or nap
- To bulldoze
- Doze (Android), a power management scheme introduced in Android Marshmallow and expanded in Android Nougat
