= Allan Wu =

Singaporean actor (born 1972)

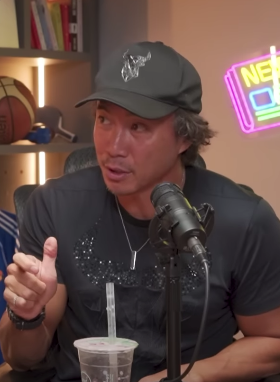
- Wu in 2024
- Born: June 11, 1972 (age 54); Los Angeles, California, United States
- Occupations: Actor; host; model
- Spouse: Wong Li Lin (m. 2003; div. 2013)
- Children: 2

Stage name
- Traditional Chinese: 吳振天
- Simplified Chinese: 吴振天
- Hanyu Pinyin: Wú Zhèntiān

Birth name
- Traditional Chinese: 吳振宇
- Simplified Chinese: 吴振宇
- Hanyu Pinyin: Wú Zhènyǔ

Allan Wu (born June 11, 1972) is a Singapore-based Chinese-American actor, host, VJ and model.

He is best known for being the host of 3 different editions of the popular reality game show, The Amazing Race. He was the host of 5 seasons of AXN Asia's The Amazing Race Asia, 3 seasons of International Channel Shanghai's The Amazing Race: China Rush and 4 seasons of Shenzhen Media Group's Chinese edition of The Amazing Race.

Wu decided to change his Chinese name because it was similar to Hong Kong film star Francis Ng (Chinese: 吳鎮宇; pinyin: Wú Zhènyù).

== Early life and education ==
Wu was born in Los Angeles, California, United States to Chinese immigrant parents from Shenyang, Liaoning, China. His first language was Mandarin as his parents spoke it at home. He graduated from the University of California, Berkeley in the United States and worked in the biotechnology industry for several years. He eventually discovered his desire to become an actor after an accident made him reassess his life. He did some modeling for a while and also participated in an episode of the reality competition series Fear Factor, where he placed 2nd. He moved to Hong Kong where he worked as an actor.

== Career ==
Despite struggling with limited knowledge of Cantonese, MTV Taiwan gave him a stint as a VJ, during which he co-hosted a Christmas concert. He moved to Singapore and began acting in Chinese language drama series on Channel 8.

He has been the host for all five seasons of The Amazing Race Asia. He is also the host of The Amazing Race: China Rush, the Chinese version of The Amazing Race. In Season 16 of the American version of The Amazing Race, Allan Wu made a cameo appearance in Singapore, handing out clues.

=== Venture into podcasting ===
In 2024, Wu launched Call Us Daddy, a male-centric podcast tailored for older men that has garnered attention for its celebrity guests and candid discussions. The show has made headlines for offering raw and personal insights into the lives of its guests.

In one popular episode, actor Christopher Lee shared his regret over not completing his education, while another notable episode saw entrepreneur and former radio personality Daniel Ong address the controversial Twelve Cupcakes scandal.

== Personal life ==
In September 2011, Wu and his family relocated to Shanghai, China to be nearer to job commitments.

Wu was married to former Mediacorp actress Wong Li Lin and they have a daughter Sage and son Jonas. The couple is managed by Fly Entertainment. In 2013, the couple separated. In 2017, Wu started dating a contestant from The Amazing Race Asia 5 Yvonne Lee.

== Filmography ==
=== Television series ===
Year	Title	Role	Notes
2002	Bukit Ho Swee		
2002	Beautiful Connection	Du Zhengyu	
2002	The Unbeatables III	Ding Wei	
2003	True Heroes	Wang Feng	
2003	A Child's Hope		
2003	Always On My Mind (无炎的爱)		
2004	My In-Laws (我的岳父岳母)		Sitcom
2004	A Child's Hope II		
2004	Fear Factor		1 episode
2005	My Lucky Charm		
2005	Baby Blues		
2006	C.I.D.	Steve	
2006	House of Joy	Zheng Sanji	
2011	Miss Universe China	Host	Hosting
2012	Rally On		Channel 5 production
2014	Mata Mata: A New Era	Alan Leong	Channel 5 production
2017	Kidnapped (绑架)	Officer Lee	Male lead; Toggle Original Series
2018	Divided (分裂)		Male lead; Toggle Original Series
2019	C.L.I.F 5	Alexis	
2021	Crouching Tiger Hidden Ghost	Evan Lau	
2021	The Heartland Hero	Jimmy	
2022	Truths About Us (别来无恙)	Dai Shouzheng	

=== Film ===
Year	Title	Role	Notes
1999	Never Compromise (逆我者死)	Chun Yu Ng	
2003	Night Corridor (妖夜迴廊)	Vincent Sze	
2004	Rice Rhapsody	Ronald	
2005	I Do, I Do	Chen Jianfeng	
2008	The Leap Years	Steven	
2008	Kung Fu Hip Hop	Tang Ge	
2010	Love Cuts	Timothy Tang	Special appearance
2011	Overheard 2		

=== Television shows ===
Year	Title	Notes
2003	Discover Australia (奥妙无及现)	
2005	Hua Yu, Cool!	Mediacorp Channel 5
2006–2016	The Amazing Race Asia	
2010	The Amazing Race 16	Cameo appearance
2010–2012	The Amazing Race: China Rush	
2014–2017	The Amazing Race China	From Season 1 Episode 3

== Brand ambassador ==
Year	Brand	Notes
2003	TAG Heuer	
2009	Carlsberg	
2014	Oakley	

== Awards and nominations ==
Year	Awards	Category	Nominated work	Result	Ref
2002	Star Awards	Best Newcomer	—N/a	Nominated	
2021	Asian Television Awards	Best Actor in a Supporting Role	Crouching Tiger Hidden Ghost	Nominated	
