= Snow dozer =

Type of railroad snowplow

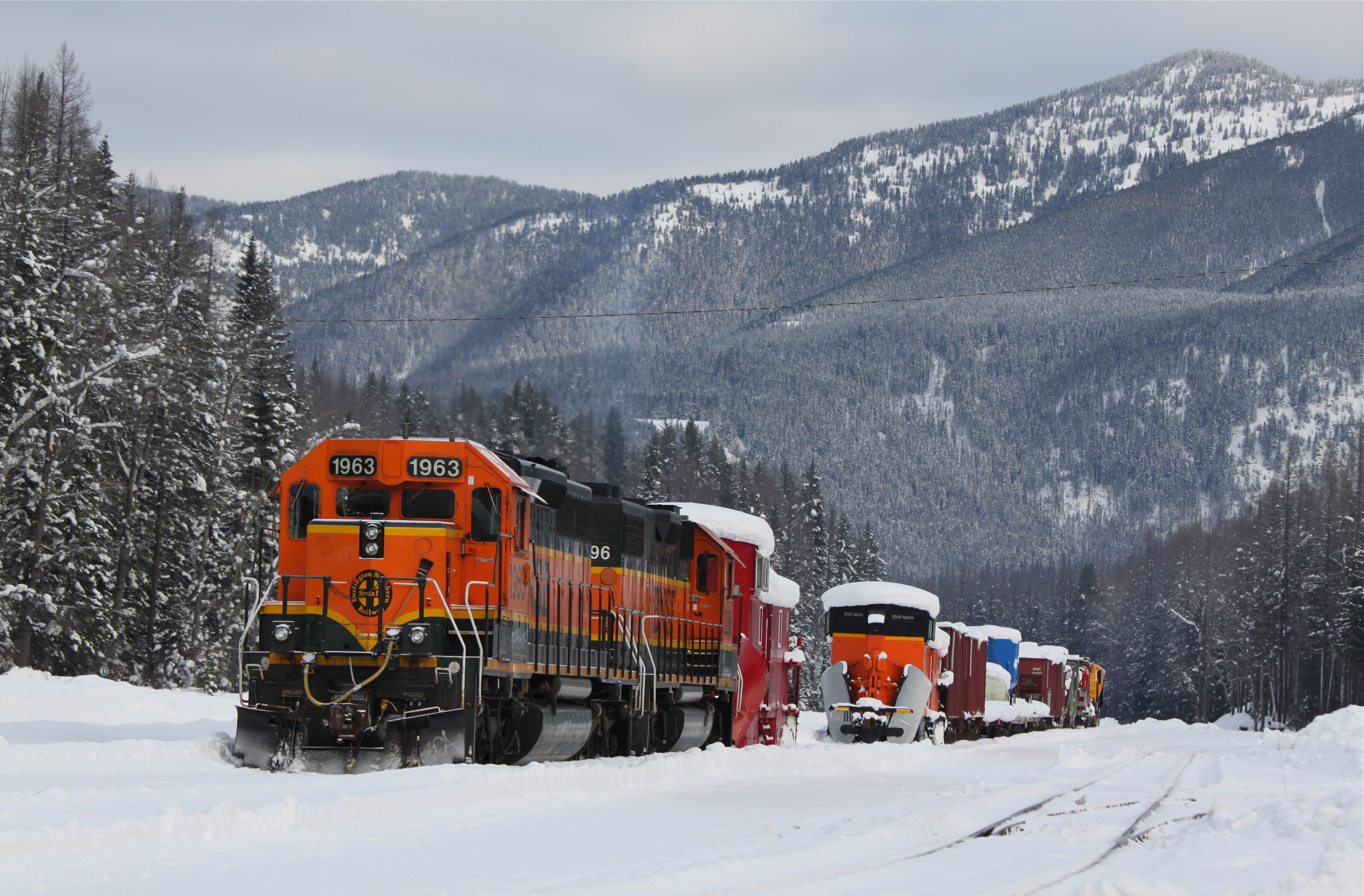
Two BNSF snow dozers and their power idle in Essex, Montana. The BNSF snow dozer on the left is in the original brown that Great Northern used while the snow dozer on the right is in a new BNSF inspired scheme. The unique chain positioned blades on the front are visible on the snow dozer in the BNSF scheme.

The snow dozer is a unique snowplow design of the Great Northern Railway. They were built on old cars with wood and later metal car bodies around 1900, and they are often confused with Jordan spreaders. Many went on to the Burlington Northern Railroad and are still in service with BNSF.

== History ==
The Great Northern Railway built numerous snowplows of a unique design, referred to as snow dozers. Snow dozers are similar in operation and appearance to Jordan spreaders, but they use less complex chain-operated systems to raise and lower their blades. Early snow dozers were built of wood, but they were modernized with steel bodies and later constructed with steel bodies. Many snow dozers are still in use by BNSF, and a few examples have been preserved.

== Preservation ==
- The Texas State Railroad has a wood Great Northern snow dozer from 1926. It is located in Rusk, Texas. X-1683 was built in 1926 as GN 95264 on the frame of Hart ballast car. X-1683 was part of the largest group of dozers built by GN and exemplifies the design.

== See also ==
- Burlington Northern Railroad
- Great Northern Railway
