= City Chase =

City Chase is an urban adventure event, originating in Toronto, Canada, in which teams compete to obtain the most "ChasePoints" (also known as Check Points).

== Background ==
It originated in Toronto, Ontario, in 2003 and has expanded to fifteen other countries; events have occurred in a series in eight U.S. cities. Two-person teams compete over a four- to six-hour time span to navigate through a city and find certain clues, or engage in various events that present physical, intellectual, and humorous challenges. The event has been sponsored in the past by Bell ("Bell City Chase") and is now sponsored by Scion ("The Scion City Chase"). The event was created by the hosts, Nick Jelinek and Infield Marketing Group. Depending on the city the participants may be required to only use transit and their feet. A very similar game was designed as a part of Encounter project in Eastern Europe. These games were called Points and are held on a regular basis in several countries worldwide.

Often teams that win the city-based race are then invited to represent their province/state or country at a national/international festival.

== Events ==
Events are designed to "push comfort zones". Examples of events that push comfort zones include "Strip Basketball" or "Strip Bowling" which is a bowling game in which participants are required to "remove a layer of clothing, down to their underwear" each time both members of a team miss the target by more than a specified distance. Other events in the 2009 Vancouver CityChase included "Heat Heat Heat" where competitors had to don firefighter equipment and do their drills, go dragon boating and more.

== See also ==
- Encounter (game)
