= The Amazing Race: China Rush =

Chinese adventure reality game show

- English logo Chinese logo
- Also known as: 极速前进：冲刺！中国
- Genre: Reality competition
- Created by: Elise Doganieri; Bertram van Munster
- Based on: The Amazing Race by: Bertram van Munster; Elise Doganieri
- Directed by: Chad Grochowski
- Presented by: Allan Wu 吴振天 (previously known as 吴振宇)
- Theme music composer: John M. Keane
- Country of origin: China
- Original languages: Chinese; English
- No. of seasons: 3
- No. of episodes: 36

Production
- Executive producer: Xia Jing
- Producers: Yi YangTian, Diao ShuWen, Julliet Pan
- Editors: Julliet Pan; Yi YangTian
- Running time: 60–90 minutes
- Production companies: Fly Films (2010); She&Jul Films (2011); Boxtop Studios (2012)

Original release
- Network: International Channel Shanghai (English); Dragon TV (Chinese; since season 2)
- Release: August 8, 2010 – November 11, 2012

Related
- International versions

The Amazing Race: China Rush (Chinese: 极速前进：冲刺！中国; pinyin: Jísù Qiánjìn: Chōngcì! Zhōngguó) is a Chinese reality competition show based on the American series The Amazing Race. Following the premise of other versions in the Amazing Race franchise, the show follows teams of two as they race across China. Each season is split into legs, with teams tasked to deduce clues, navigate themselves in foreign areas, interact with locals, perform physical and mental challenges, and travel by air, boat, car, taxi, and other modes of transport. Teams are progressively eliminated at the end of most legs for being the last to arrive at designated Pit Stops. The first team to arrive at the Finish Line wins a trip around the world.

In March 2010, a Chinese version of the show was announced by the Disney-ABC International Television Asia Pacific. The show was produced by Shanghai-based international production company Fly Films, which had previously produced Shanghai Rush in 2009, a showed heavily influenced by The Amazing Race. The first series was filmed in April/June 2010 and broadcast in August 2010 by International Channel Shanghai. Starting with the second season, it was announced that Dragon TV would broadcast a Chinese-language version of the show. The host for the show is Singapore based Chinese-American actor Allan Wu, who was also the host of The Amazing Race Asia.

== The Race ==
The Amazing Race: China Rush is a reality television competition between teams of two in a race around China. Each season starts in Shanghai and is divided into a number of legs wherein teams travel and complete various tasks to obtain clues to help them progress to a Pit Stop where they are given a chance to rest and recover before starting the next leg. The first team to arrive at a Pit Stop is often awarded a prize, while the last team is normally eliminated (except in non-elimination legs, where the last team to arrive may be penalized in the following leg). The final leg is run by the last three remaining teams, and the first to arrive at the final destination wins a trip around the world.

=== Teams ===
Each of teams are composed of two individuals who have some type of relationship to each other.

The participants speak both Chinese and English. The contestants chosen to appear are from various countries and not solely from China, however these contestants must be living in China for a period of time in order to apply.

=== Route Markers ===
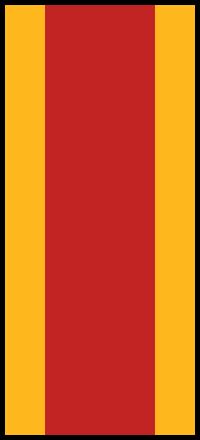

Route Markers are yellow and red flags that mark the places where teams must go. Most Route Markers are attached to the boxes that contain clue envelopes, but some may mark the place where the teams must go in order to complete tasks, or may be used to line a course that the teams must follow.

=== Clues ===
Clues are found in sealed envelopes, normally inside clue boxes. They give teams the information they need and tasks they need to do in order for them to progress through the legs. Clues are written in both Chinese and English.

- Route Info: A general clue that may include a task to be completed by the team before they can receive their next clue.
- Detour: A choice of two tasks. Teams are free to choose either task or swap tasks if they find one option too difficult.
- Roadblock: A task only one team member can complete. Teams must choose which member will complete the task based on a brief clue about the task before fully revealing the details of the task.
- Fast Forward: Introduced in Season 3. A task that if completed allows a team to skip all remaining tasks in the leg and go directly to the Pit Stop. A team may only use the Fast Forward once.

=== Obstacles ===
Teams may encounter the follow obstructions that could potentially slow them down:

- U-Turn: A station located after a Detour where a team can force another trailing team to return and complete the other option of the Detour they did not select. Season 2 introduced the Double U-Turn which allows two teams to exercise their U-Turn power.
- Yield: A station where a team can force another trailing team to wait a pre-determined amount of time before continuing racing. In the first two seasons, the teams had to wait until a spiral of incense finished burning, which took 15 minutes. Starting with Season 3, an hourglass filled with sand was used, which took 20 minutes.
- Intersection: Introduced in season 2, this sign indicates that two teams must complete further tasks together until a clue indicates that they are no longer Intersected.

=== Legs ===
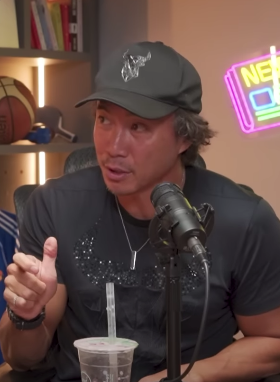
Host Allan Wu

At the beginning of each leg, teams receive an allowance of cash, usually in U.S. dollars, to cover expenses during the legs (except for the purchase of airline tickets, which are paid-for by provided credit cards provided).

Teams then have to follow clues and Route Markers that will lead them to the various destinations and tasks they will face. Modes of travel between these destinations include commercial and chartered airplanes, boats, trains, taxis, buses, and rented vehicles provided by the show, or the teams may simply travel by foot. Each leg ends with a twelve-hour Pit Stop (提示) where teams are able to rest and where teams that arrive last are progressively eliminated until only three remain. The first teams to arrive at the Pit Stop win prizes, usually from the show's sponsors.

==== Non-elimination legs ====
Each season has a number of predetermined non-elimination legs, in which the last team to arrive at the Pit Stop is not eliminated and is allowed to continue.

- Speed Bump: A task that only the team saved from elimination on the previous leg must complete before continuing on.

==== Unusual elimination ====
- Introduced in the third season, an unusual elimination occurred at the Starting Line where only ten sets of bus tickets were available to the first destination city, and the season began with eleven teams. After 10 teams completed the task at the starting line and received tickets to their first destination, the last team remaining was eliminated; however, at the Pit Stop later, the last team was not being eliminated.

==== Virtual Pit Stops ====
Introduced in the second season, a virtual pit stop is counted as an actual pit stop where teams do not rest, beginning the next leg immediately without receiving the usual money or prizes (hence, virtual).

== Rules and penalties ==
Most of the rules and penalties are adopted directly from the American edition; but in some of cases, this version has been seen to have a unique set of additional rules.

=== Rules ===
- Unlike the American, Australian, and Asian versions, there seems to be no rule prohibiting hitchhiking, as teams in the second season rode in private vehicles on a few occasions with no penalty.

=== Penalties ===
- If a team member helps their partner with a Roadblock, they will be issued a 30-minute penalty at the Pit Stop before being allowed to check in.
- Failing to complete a challenge will result in a 2-hour penalty (4 hours in season 1) that must be served before teams can receive their next clue.
- Teams failing to place their backpacks in the designated area at a challenge will be issued a 30-minute penalty at the Pit Stop before being allowed to check in.

== Seasons ==
Season	Broadcast		Winners	Teams
Season	Premiere date	Finale date	Winners	Teams
1	August 8, 2010	October 30, 2010	Australia, United States: Charlie Gale & Rachel Chen	10
2	August 7, 2011	October 23, 2011	United States, Germany: Lily Li & Jan Höpper	11
3	August 26, 2012	November 11, 2012	China: Liu Weiwei & Lei Sheng	11

== Rankings ==
Country	Season 1	Season 2	Season 3
Australia	Winner ^{1} / 2nd ^{2}	4th ^{1}	5th ^{1}
Canada	4th ^{1}	11th ^{1}	11th ^{1}
China (Host)		2nd ^{1} / 3rd ^{3} / 5th / 8th / 10th	Winner / 2nd ^{2} / 4th / 8th / 9th / 11th ^{1}
England	5th ^{1}		
Germany		Winner ^{1}	
Ghana		11th ^{1}	
India	3rd		
Kenya	10th		
Latvia	8th		
Malaysia			6th
Mexico	9th		
New Zealand		4th ^{1}	
Scotland			10th ^{1}
Sweden			5th ^{1}
Ukraine		6th ^{1}	
United Kingdom		6th ^{1}	
United States	Winner ^{1} / 4th ^{1} / 5th ^{1} / 6th / 7th	Winner ^{1} / 2nd ^{1} ^{2} / 7th	3rd / 7th / 10th ^{1}

indicates the winning country.
indicates the runner-up country.
indicates the third-place country.
indicates the country did not participate.

Notes:

^1 Sarah & Molly, Karen & Lisa, Charlie & Rachel, Paul & Nash, Elena & Tameka, Matt & Kylie, Simon & Katherine, Lily & Jan, Jia Jia & Rob, Nick & Brandon and Janelle & Karin are all teams which representing 2 different countries.
^2 Australia, China and United States each was the winner and the runner-up in a different season.
^3 The both runner-up teams in season 2 was from China.

place	Country	Winner	Runner-up	Third-place	Total
1st	United States	2	1	1	4
2nd	China (Host)	1	2	1	4
3rd	Australia	1	1	0	2
4th	Germany	1	0	0	1
5th	India	0	0	1	1
6th	Canada	0	0	0	0
6th	England	0	0	0	0
6th	Ghana	0	0	0	0
6th	Kenya	0	0	0	0
6th	Latvia	0	0	0	0
6th	Malaysia	0	0	0	0
6th	Mexico	0	0	0	0
6th	New Zealand	0	0	0	0
6th	Scotland	0	0	0	0
6th	Sweden	0	0	0	0
6th	Ukraine	0	0	0	0
6th	United Kingdom	0	0	0	0
Total		5	4	3	12

== Locations visited ==
After three seasons, The Amazing Race: China Rush has visited 17 provinces, including the claimed Taiwan Province, and 3 municipalities.

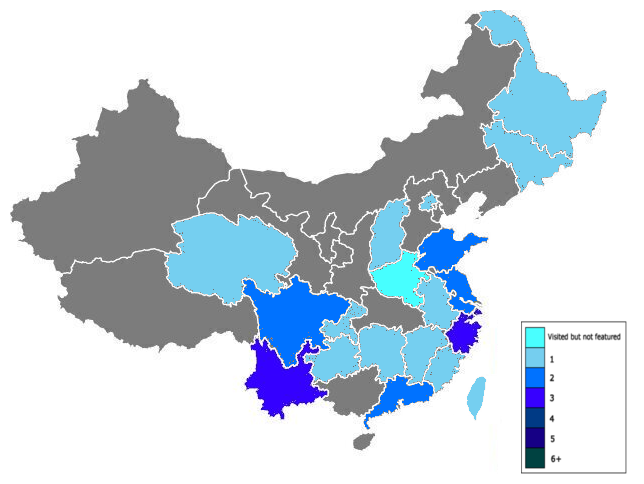
Provinces and municipalities visited by The Amazing Race: China Rush.

Rank	Province	Season visited	Pit Stops
1	Shanghai	3 (1, 2, 3)	2^{1}
1	Yunnan	3 (1, 2, 3)	5
1	Zhejiang	3 (1, 2, 3)	4
4	Guangdong	2 (1, 2)	2
4	Jiangsu	2 (1, 3)	4
4	Shandong	2 (1, 2)	3
4	Sichuan	2 (1, 3)	3^{2}
8	Anhui	1 (3)	1
8	Beijing	1 (1)	1
8	Chongqing	1 (2)	1
8	Fujian	1 (2)	1
8	Guizhou	1 (3)	1
8	Heilongjiang	1 (3)	1
8	Henan	1 (3)	0
8	Hunan	1 (2)	1
8	Jiangxi	1 (2)	1
8	Jilin	1 (3)	1
8	Qinghai	1 (2)	2
8	Shanxi	1 (3)	1
8	Taiwan	1 (3)	1

== Awards and nominations ==
Summary of awards and nominations
Year	Award	Category	Nominated	Result	Ref
2011	Asian Television Awards	Best Adaptation of an Existing Format	Season 1	Nominated	
2012	Asian Television Awards	Best Adaptation of an Existing Format	Season 2	Won	

== Notes ==
1. Includes 2 Finish Lines.
2. Includes 1 Finish Line.
