= International Channel Shanghai =

Foreign-language cable channel

- Industry: Cable television
- Founded: January 1, 2008
- Headquarters: Shanghai
- Area served: Worldwide
- Website: http://www.icshanghai.com/

International Channel Shanghai, better known as ICS, was the foreign-language cable channel of Shanghai Media Group. Long before the parent company was known as SMG, Shanghai Television Station began producing the English-language News at Ten in 1986. On January 1, 2008, ICS replaced the Shanghai Broadcasting MusicChannel as a 24-hour English service (with one weekly program in Japanese). In 2010, the channel replaced its "Red Sun Seagull" logo from the old Oriental TV channel with the STV "Magnolia" logo. The channel's news department produces a Monday-through-Saturday news program Shanghai Live at 9:00pm, and the weekly business/financial news program Money Talks on Saturday nights. On December 8, 2011, the Asian Television Awards named Shanghai Live "Best News Programme" of 2011.

Other locally produced programs included:

- Bridge to Japan 中日之橋
- Money Talks
- Cosmo Times
- City Beat
- You Are the Chef
- Getaway
- Culture Matters
- Voices
- Way to Wellness
- Minds of Millionaires

The channel also co-produced two seasons of The Amazing Race: China Rush, whose first season was "highly commended" at the 2011 Asian Television Awards.

On 1 January 2025, SMG shut down ICS and its flagship program ShanghaiEye moved to Dragon TV.
