= Sam Voutas =

Australian actor and filmmaker

- Born: Canberra, Australia
- Other name: Sima You
- Occupations: Actor, film director, screenwriter,

Sam Voutas is an Australian actor and independent filmmaker. He is best known for writing and directing Red Light Revolution, China's "first sex shop comedy" which was nominated for Best Unproduced Screenplay at the 2008 Australian Inside Film Awards, showcased at The Santa Barbara International Film Festival and won the audience award at The Terracotta Far East Film Festival. Voutas played Durdin in Lu Chuan's acclaimed City of Life and Death, a Chinese film about The Rape of Nanjing. The film won Best Director (Lu Chuan) and Best Cinematographer (Cao Yu) Awards at the 4th Asian Film Awards in 2010. Voutas wrote and directed the documentary The Last Breadbox, featuring Beijing taxi drivers in the run-up to the 2008 Olympic Games.

== Career ==
Voutas was born in Canberra, Australia and is of Greek ancestry. His mother is from Melbourne and his father Anthony is from Kastania. While his mother was an official in the Australian Public Service, the family lived in China from 1986 to 1989. Voutas returned to China in 2005 and speaks Mandarin fluently.

He graduated from The Victorian College of the Arts.

Red Light Revolution was originally written in English, translated into Chinese, then that version was re-translated to reflect the Beijing slang hua. It was released in China on Tudou in 2011, with producer Melanie Ansley commenting that "We wanted to make a film that might have challenged censors, and if that was the case we were shutting ourselves off from television and cinema. I think the internet offers a place for stuff that takes a little more risk." It won the People's Choice Award at the Singapore International Film Festival's Silver Screen Awards in 2011.

In 2017, Sam directed King of Peking based on his original screenplay that he had been inspired to write based on his memories of life in Beijing in the 90's and the upcoming birth of his child which had got him thinking about the pressures of fatherhood.

Voutas has spoken in interviews about film censorship in China, saying "I'd love to keep making movies [in China], my dilemma is whether a script can be passed by the censors without having its wings clipped. My fear is that increasingly censors are the directors of films, and that directors and producers, fearing cuts, then self-censor themselves from the get-go. That's an environment that isn't too conducive to creativity in general. So perhaps my next film will be about censors themselves and the final cut will run exactly zero seconds long."

== Filmography ==
Year	Film	Role
2002	The Last Breadbox	Director/Writer
2004	Crash Test	171096/Sala
2006	Shanghai Bride	Director/Editor
2006	Watch Me	Actor (Taku the freak boy), Writer/Editor/Producer
2007	Dragon Sons Phoenix Daughters (TV)	Director
2008	Foreign Devils	Actor (Zach)
2009	City of Life and Death	Actor (Durdin) (as You Sima)
2009	Gasp	Actor (Nick)
2009	New Beijing: Reinventing a City	Cinematographer
2010	Walking the Dead	Actor (Charles)
2010	East West Rain aka Dong feng yu – China (original title)	Actor (Voice of Smith)
2010	Tiger Team: The Mountain of the 1000 Dragons	Camera
2010	Red Light Revolution	Actor (Jack Deroux), director, writer, editor
2011	Legend of Jie Zhenguo	Actor (Van Der Sa) as You Sima
2012	Roulette City	Cinematographer
2012	The Amazing Race: China Rush (TV series)	Camera operator
2014 (Completed)(Unreleased)	Empires of the Deep	Actor (Papos)
2014	Operation Ice (Short)	Writer
2015	Land of the Dynasty	Actor
2016	Mr Dead Planet	Actor
2017	King of Peking	Writer, Director
2020	False Colours	Actor (Warren)
