= Fangxiang (disambiguation) =

Fangxiang is a traditional Chinese metallophone.

Fangxiang may also refer to:

- Fangxiang, Jiangsu, a town in Yangzhou, Jiangsu, China
- Fangxiang Township, Leishan County, Guizhou, China
- Fangxiangshi, ancient Chinese ritual exorcists
