= Empires of the Deep =

Unreleased action-adventure fantasy film

- Official poster
- Directed by: Jonathan Lawrence; Michael French; Scott Miller
- Written by: Randall Frakes; Jon Jiang (story)
- Produced by: Jon Jiang; Harrison Liang
- Starring: Olga Kurylenko
- Cinematography: Xiaobing Rao
- Countries: United States; China
- Language: English
- Budget: US$130 million

Empires of the Deep
- Simplified Chinese: 人鱼帝国
- Traditional Chinese: 人魚帝國
- Literal meaning: Mermaid Empire
Transcriptions
Standard Mandarin
- Hanyu Pinyin: Rényú Dìguó

Empires of the Deep is an unreleased 3D action-adventure fantasy film, written by Randall Frakes, directed by Jonathan Lawrence, Michael French and Scott Miller, and starring Olga Kurylenko. The film was conceived by Chinese real estate tycoon Jon Jiang, who partially financed the United States–Chinese co-production. Originally intended for a worldwide theatrical release in 2011, the film remains unreleased as of September 2026.

== Plot ==
The eight mermaid kingdoms have reigned as the protectors of the oceans since the creation of Earth, but the current peace comes under threat from the re-emergence of the Demon Mage and his legions. After his village is caught up in the conflict, a Greek hero named Atlas sets out with his friend Trajin to rescue Atlas's father and bring back the holy Temple of Poseidon, which has been stolen by an army of mermen knights.

== Cast ==
- Olga Kurylenko as The Mermaid Queen
- Shi Yanfei as Aka
- Steve Polites as Atlas
- Maxx Maulion as Trajin
- Jonathan Kos-Read as The King of the Ocean
- Aaron Shang as Adjutant Stavros
- Kerry Berry Brogan as Dada
- Sam Voutas as Papos
- Pierre Bourdaud as Gava
- Jean-Michel Casanova as The Pirate Captain
- Liang Yanfei as a Mermaid
- Pierre Reno as "The One-Eyed Ogre"
- William Shriver as Merchant
- Alec Su as a Mermen Kingdom Soldier
- Adam Days as Prince Alastair Crowe
- Andre Queme as Pirate

== Production ==
The film is the pet project of Chinese billionaire realtor Jon Jiang (Jiang Hongyu), who came up with the story and financed part of the film's budget. A cinephile, he believed that with his wealth he could make an epic film in the same vein of those from Hollywood filmmakers Steven Spielberg, George Lucas and Peter Jackson. The original title of the film was Mermaid Island.

The film was reported to be a major US-Chinese co-production, with its production budget reported to be over $130 million, though according to some cast and crew members the film's budget was actually much less, at least initially. In 2007, Jiang hired regular James Cameron-collaborator Randall Frakes to develop the story and write the initial script. According to Jiang, the screenplay eventually went through 40 drafts and took over four years to complete using a total of ten screenwriters. Initially Monica Bellucci was set to star in the film as the Mermaid Queen, although she eventually dropped out and Sharon Stone was courted and then replaced with Olga Kurylenko, who was reportedly paid $1 million for the role. Steve Polites, who played the male lead of Atlas, signed up for a potential trilogy of films.

Jiang tried to persuade Irvin Kershner to direct the film, but the director preferred to film a version pitched by Frakes that was set in the modern day. When Jiang refused, both Frakes and Kershner left the production. Catwoman director Pitof was ultimately hired to direct, though he also dropped out over disagreements with Jiang before filming started. Filming began in 2009 in China under the helm of commercial and music video director Jonathan Lawrence. Jiang also formed a production and visual effects company, Fontelysee Pictures, to work on the movie. Much of the film was shot on location in Fujian and outside of Beijing, as well as on soundstages in the capital.

The film was planned to be the start of a franchise on the scale of Star Wars or The Lord of the Rings, with a trilogy to be made and an accompanying animated series, video games and a theme park in China. Jiang also described to Lawrence his vision for the film as "Transformers meets Shakespeare"; Lawrence responded that the film would likely "alienate one of those audiences".

Despite his role as producer of the film, Jiang rarely appeared on set, preferring to liaise with Lawrence via the film's co-producer and assistant director. In interviews Lawrence has revealed the difficulties he encountered during his time filming the movie, including cultural clashes between the Chinese crew and the overseas talent, disagreements with the film's cinematographer over their working styles which resulted in filming slowing down to a crawl, and frustration over Jiang's control over various aspects of the film production, such as casting, the set and costume design, and an insistence on shooting on location, which was often a cold and wet experience. Lawrence was also troubled by the less stringent safety requirements on set, and at one point he witnessed an assault on a crew member by a camera operator but was persuaded not to intervene. There were also communication difficulties between him and Jiang, as well as other members of the crew, partially due to Lawrence's translator's fear of offending Jiang. At one point Lawrence joked about building a large wall to hide a resort on a beach from view of the film cameras; due to a mistranslation he found a wall actually being built when he arrived to shoot at the location. Lawrence, who envisioned the film as an epic and fun adventure in the same vein of Raiders of the Lost Ark, also attempted to rewrite the script, which he believed had potential but found convoluted and full of plot holes, but faced pushback from Jiang over his proposed changes. During one heated meeting, a frustrated Lawrence told Jiang to his face that the script was the worst thing he had ever read. Despite their frequent disagreements, Jiang still respected Lawrence.

Actors Steve Polites and Maxx Maulion, although initially optimistic about the shoot, described a growing sense of uncertainty as the film became beset by production problems, and the shoot did not have the comforts, perks and professionalism they would be expecting if it was a Hollywood production. Polites and Maulion have described working 22-hour long days without proper breaks or time off which left them extremely fatigued, while many of the actors and crew were allegedly paid late or even not at all, with police sent to a hotel to check the visas of a Russian group of extras as an intimidation tactic after they had complained of late payment. The stunt team, which worked independent of Lawrence's crew, reportedly suffered regular accidents due to compromises in safety, and Polites and Maulion were expected to do their own stunts, despite their lack of training or preparation.

In a 2018 article, Polites related his experiences on set, describing spending a week filming in a water tank that resulted in him suffering severe eye pain due to the over-chlorinated water, and a shoot in a cave in which everyone except himself were given hard hats due to the danger of falling rocks. The harsh and potentially unsafe working conditions on set led to actress Irena Violette quitting the movie partway through production; in retaliation the producers withheld her passport and demanded she repay her salary in exchange for its return, which led to Violette and her boyfriend secretly escaping from the set in Fujian to the US Consulate General in Shanghai with the help of Lawrence, a few sympathetic crew members, and the local police. Subsequently her character was recast with Kerry Berry Brogan taking on the role. Maulion, who played the major supporting role of Trajin, also walked off the set after the production did not pay him the last three months of his salary; his remaining scenes were shot with a double.

Lawrence shot for five months before deciding to move on to follow other opportunities and return to his family in Los Angeles. In a 2014 article, Lawrence also claimed that the continued lapses in safety was another factor in him deciding to leave. Television director Michael French took over in February 2010 with two thirds of the movie left to shoot. Finding the script campy, he decided to direct the film as a comedy, and deleted dialogue scenes to speed up filming. Kurylenko arrived in China in April 2010 to film her scenes. French left later that month due to prior commitments, with filming still yet to be completed. He was replaced by Scott Miller, a documentarian and son of sports filmmaker Warren Miller, who saw the film as an epic love story and lobbied Jiang to reshoot the entire movie to match his vision, but was denied. He completed shooting the remaining third of the film in late 2010.

Although intended to be released in 2011, the film failed to find distribution. Polites later attended reshoots in China in 2014. That same year Jiang reportedly hired frequent Spielberg-collaborator Michael Kahn to edit the film. In 2015, Jiang blamed the delays and the ballooning budget on the extensive and expensive special effects that took years to complete, and was waiting for more investment money to come in.

== Marketing and failed release ==
On April 27, 2010, director Michael French and stars Olga Kurylenko, Steve Polites, Shi Yanfei and Jonathan Kos-Read appeared at a press conference held at a studio in Beijing, where they presented a trailer for the film, with journalists given 3D glasses to wear. In the following months Jon Jiang gave foreign journalists, including those from The Hollywood Reporter and The New York Times, tours of the set. On June 9, 2010, over one hundred on-set photos from the film were revealed.

In late 2012, a trailer for the film appeared online, advertising a 2013 release date. It received a largely negative response.

In January 2016, the producers launched a crowdfunding campaign seeking 1 million yuan ($150k) in funding. The campaign included a new trailer with updated visual effects. The producers advertised an April 2016 release date for the film; however the campaign was unsuccessful. Polites, who had seen an unfinished cut of the film, believed that post-production work on the scale of an Avengers film would be needed to complete the film to a releasable standard.

As of September 2026, the film remains unreleased.
