= The Amazing Race: China Rush 3 =

Season of television series

- Season 3
- Presented by: Allan Wu
- No. of teams: 11
- Winners: Liu Weiwei & Lei Sheng
- No. of legs: 12
- Distance traveled: 5,000 mi (8,000 km)
- No. of episodes: 12

Release
- Original network: ICS; Dragon TV
- Original release: August 26 – November 11, 2012

Additional information
- Filming dates: April 1 – April 28, 2012

Series chronology
- ← Previous; Season 2

The Amazing Race: China Rush 3 (Chinese: 极速前进：冲刺！中国; pinyin: Jísù Qiánjìn: Chōngcì! Zhōngguó) is the third season of The Amazing Race: China Rush, a Chinese reality competition show based on the American series The Amazing Race. It featured 11 teams of two, each with a pre-existing relationship, in a race across 11 cities in China, to win a trip around the world.

The Chinese TV network International Channel Shanghai aired the season in English and Dragon TV aired the season in Chinese. It ran from April 1 to 28, 2012.

Trainers Liu Weiwei and Lei Sheng were the winners of this season becoming the first Chinese team in the history of the show to win.

== Production ==
=== Development and filming ===
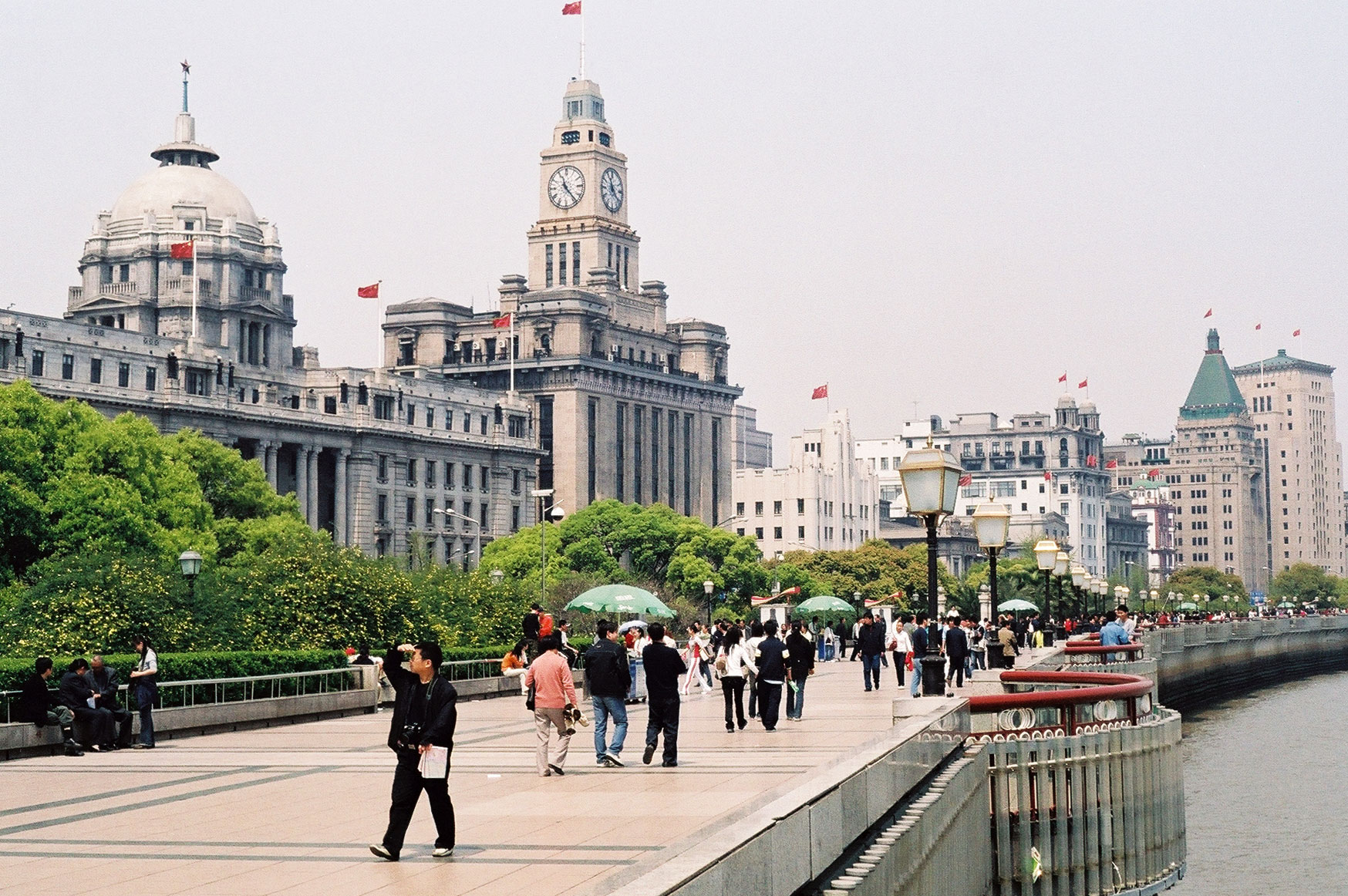
The waterfront area of The Bund was the Starting Line for the third season of The Amazing Race: China Rush.

The Express Pass, which was awarded to the team who finishes first on the first leg, was introduced in this season. This item allowed the holders to skip a certain task of their choosing before Leg 8. This season also featured an elimination at the Starting Line, which was first seen in the 15th American season. For the Yield, the yielded team had to turn over an hourglass (a feature that was still used for Yields in other versions of the whole franchise), which took 20 minutes. Teams also made a visit to Taiwan, making it the first time the show left Mainland China.

Filming for this season began on April 1, 2012 and ended on April 28, 2012.

=== Casting ===
Applications were accepted from December 1, 2011 with open auditions taking place in Shanghai in early January. Open auditions ended early February with applicants receiving notification if they were successful on Feb 15th.

== Cast ==
Contestants included Xiao Bing & Xiao Bang, who were finalists on China's Got Talent.

After being eliminated on Leg 11, Zhang Yelin proposed to Li Yang, who accepted.

Contestants	Age	Relationship	Hometown	Status
Hao "Jiajia" Weiru (郝为加)	30	Friends/Animal Lovers	Chengdu, Sichuan	Eliminated 1st (in Shanghai)
Rob Biggs (罗伯特)	42	Friends/Animal Lovers	Canada	Eliminated 1st (in Shanghai)
Nick Black (尼克)	30	Neighbors	Scotland, United Kingdom	Eliminated 2nd (in Suifenhe, Heilongjiang)
Brandon Lee (李之盛)	27	Neighbors	Boston, Massachusetts	Eliminated 2nd (in Suifenhe, Heilongjiang)
Yu Ping (俞萍)	46	Father & Daughter	Shanghai	Eliminated 3rd (in Yanji, Jilin)
Yu Chengjing (俞辰静)	22	Father & Daughter	Shanghai	Eliminated 3rd (in Yanji, Jilin)
Xiao Bing (小冰)	30	Cousins/BBQ Performers	Yingkou, Liaoning	Eliminated 4th (in Huangshan, Anhui)
Xiao Bang (小棒)	22	Cousins/BBQ Performers	Yingkou, Liaoning	Eliminated 4th (in Huangshan, Anhui)
Henry Su (苏立元)	33	Newlyweds	New Jersey	Eliminated 5th (in Nanjing, Jiangsu)
Jennifer Su (刘静雯)	32	Newlyweds	Pennsylvania	Eliminated 5th (in Nanjing, Jiangsu)
Tang Khai Shing (邓凯馨)	25	Fraternal Twins	Penang, Malaysia	Eliminated 6th (in New Taipei City, Taiwan)
Tang Khai Sheng (邓凯升)	25	Fraternal Twins	Penang, Malaysia	Eliminated 6th (in New Taipei City, Taiwan)
Janelle Loh (万黎)	21	Socialites	Sydney, Australia	Eliminated 7th (in Dali, Yunnan)
Karin von Essen (凯心)	23	Socialites	Stockholm, Sweden	Eliminated 7th (in Dali, Yunnan)
Zhang Yelin (张业林)	27	Dating Couple	Dalian, Liaoning	Eliminated 8th (on Nanzhao Island, Yunnan)
Li Yang (李洋)	27	Dating Couple	Dalian, Liaoning	Eliminated 8th (on Nanzhao Island, Yunnan)
Ryan Burke (阮伯克)	26	Harvard Graduates	New York State	Third Place
Charlie Melvin (马景洋)	24	Harvard Graduates	California	Third Place
Christine Tong (童尹恩)	23	Models	Taipei, Taiwan^{1}	Second Place
Steven Zhao (赵睿乔)	24	Models	Taipei, Taiwan^{1}	Second Place
Liu Weiwei (刘伟伟)	30	Trainers	Shandong	Winners
Lei Sheng (雷声)	40	Trainers	Xi'an, Shaanxi	Winners

== Results ==
The following teams participated in the season, with their relationships at the time of filming. Note this table does not necessarily reflect all content broadcast on television due to inclusion or exclusion of some data. Placements are listed in finishing order.

Team	Position (by leg)												Roadblocks performed
Team	1	2	3	4	5	6	7	8	⊂9⊃	10	11	12	Roadblocks performed
Liu Weiwei & Lei Sheng	1st	1st	5th	5th–	3rd	4th	1stε^{6}	4th	1st	1st	3rd^{8}	1st	Liu Weiwei 6, Lei Sheng 6^{8}
Christine & Steven	4th	3rd	7th	7th^	6th	3rd^{5}	6th	2nd	2nd	4th	2nd	2nd	Christine 6, Steven 6
Ryan & Charlie	5th	5th^{3}	3rd	1st+	2nd	1st	4th	3rd	4th	3rd	1st⊃	3rd	Ryan 6, Charlie 6
Zhang Yelin & Li Yang	9th	4th	6th	3rd~	8th	5th	5th>	1st	3rd	2nd	4th⊂		Zhang Yelin 4, Li Yang 6
Janelle & Karin	6th	9th	1stƒ	6th^	4th	6th^{5}	2nd	5th	5th	5th			Janelle 5, Karin 4
Khai Shing & Khai Sheng	7th	6th	2nd	2nd–	1st	2nd	3rd	6th^{7}					Khai Shing 4, Khai Sheng 3
Henry & Jennifer	10th	7th	8th	8th~	5th	7th	7th<						Henry 4, Jennifer 2
Xiao Bing & Xiao Bang	3rd	2nd	4th	4th+	7th	8th^{4}							Xiao Bing 1, Xiao Bang 4
Yu Ping & Yu Chenjing	2nd	8th	9th										Yu Ping 1, Yu Chenjing 1
Nick & Brandon	8th	10th											Nick 1, Brandon 1
Rob & Jia Jia	11th^{2}												Rob 0, Jia Jia 0

Key

- A red team placement means the team was eliminated.
- A green ƒ indicates that the team won a Fast Forward.
- A purple ε indicates that the team decided to use the Express Pass on that leg.
- An underlined blue team placement indicates that the team came in last on a non-elimination leg and had to perform a Speed Bump during the next leg.
- A yellow > indicates that the team chose to use the Yield; < indicates the team who received it.
- A brown ⊃ means the team chose to use a U-Turn; ⊂ indicates the team who received it; ⊂⊃ around a leg number indicates a leg where the U-Turn was available but not used.
- Matching coloured symbols (pink +, teal ^, magenta –, and olive ~) indicate teams who worked together during part of the leg as a result of an Intersection.

Notes

1. Christine & Steven are citizens of Taiwan, but in the program they were simply stated to be Chinese as the People's Republic of China does not recognize the Republic of China's statehood.
2. Jia Jia & Rob were eliminated at the Starting Line as per the provisions of the first task (see below).
3. Ryan & Charlie initially arrived 2nd, but were issued a 30-minute penalty for taking a taxi to the Detour when the clue instructed them to walk. Three teams checked-in during the penalty time, dropping Ryan & Charlie to 5th.
4. Xiao Bing & Xiao Bang initially arrived 2nd, but were issued a 30-minute penalty for not putting their bags at the designated area at the Detour location. All other teams trailing them checked-in during the penalty time, dropping Xiao Bing & Xiao Bang to last place and resulting in their elimination.
5. ^{a} ^{b} Christine & Steven and Janelle & Karin initially arrived 3rd and 5th, respectively, but both teams did not pay their taxi driver. They were instructed to return and pay their driver before being allowed to check-in. While Christine & Steven's placement were not affected, Janelle & Karin's placement were dropped to 6th.
6. Liu Weiwei & Lei Sheng used their Express Pass to bypass the Detour in Leg 7.
7. Khai Shing & Khai Sheng initially arrived 1st, but were issued a 1-hour penalty for taking a taxi directly to Fisherman's Wharf, instead of a ferry, as specified in the clue. All other teams trailing them checked-in during their penalty time, dropping Khai Shing & Khai Sheng to last place and resulting in their elimination.
8. Lei Sheng chose to forfeit the Roadblock at Leg 11 and he & Liu Weiwei were issued a 2-hour penalty at the Roadblock site.

== Prizes ==
The prize for each leg is awarded to the first place team for that leg.

- Leg 1 – The Express Pass and two round-trip tickets to Bali, Indonesia.
- Leg 2 – Two round-trip tickets to Kuala Lumpur, Malaysia.
- Leg 3 – Two round-trip tickets to Seoul, South Korea.
- Leg 4 – Two round-trip tickets to Boracay, Philippines.
- Leg 5 – Two round-trip tickets to Phuket, Thailand.
- Leg 6 – Two round-trip tickets to Brunei and a two-night stay at the Dalian Hilton Hotel.
- Leg 7 – Two round-trip tickets to Mauritius and a two-night stay at the Beijing Hilton Hotel.
- Leg 8 – Two round-trip tickets to Uluru, Australia and a two-night stay at the Guangzhou, Baiyun Hilton Hotel
- Leg 9 – A six-day cruise on Costa Cruises Victoria cruise liner departing from Shanghai to the Jeju Island, South Korea, then to Fukuoka, Japan and a two-night stay at the Nanjing Hilton Hotel.
- Leg 10 – Two round-trip tickets to Phuket, Thailand and a two-night stay at the Chongqing Hilton Hotel.
- Leg 11 – Two round-trip tickets to Guam, and a two-night stay at the Osaka, Japan Hilton Hotel.
- Leg 12 – A trip around the world.

== Race Summary ==
The complete route map of the Race. The Starting Line is represented by the green dot.

Destinations	Air travel Rail travel Water travel Bus travel Helicopter travel Bicycle travel Gondola travel
Route Markers	Detour Roadblock Fast Forward Yield; Intersection U-Turn Speed Bump Pit Stop

=== Leg 1 (Shanghai → Shanxi) ===
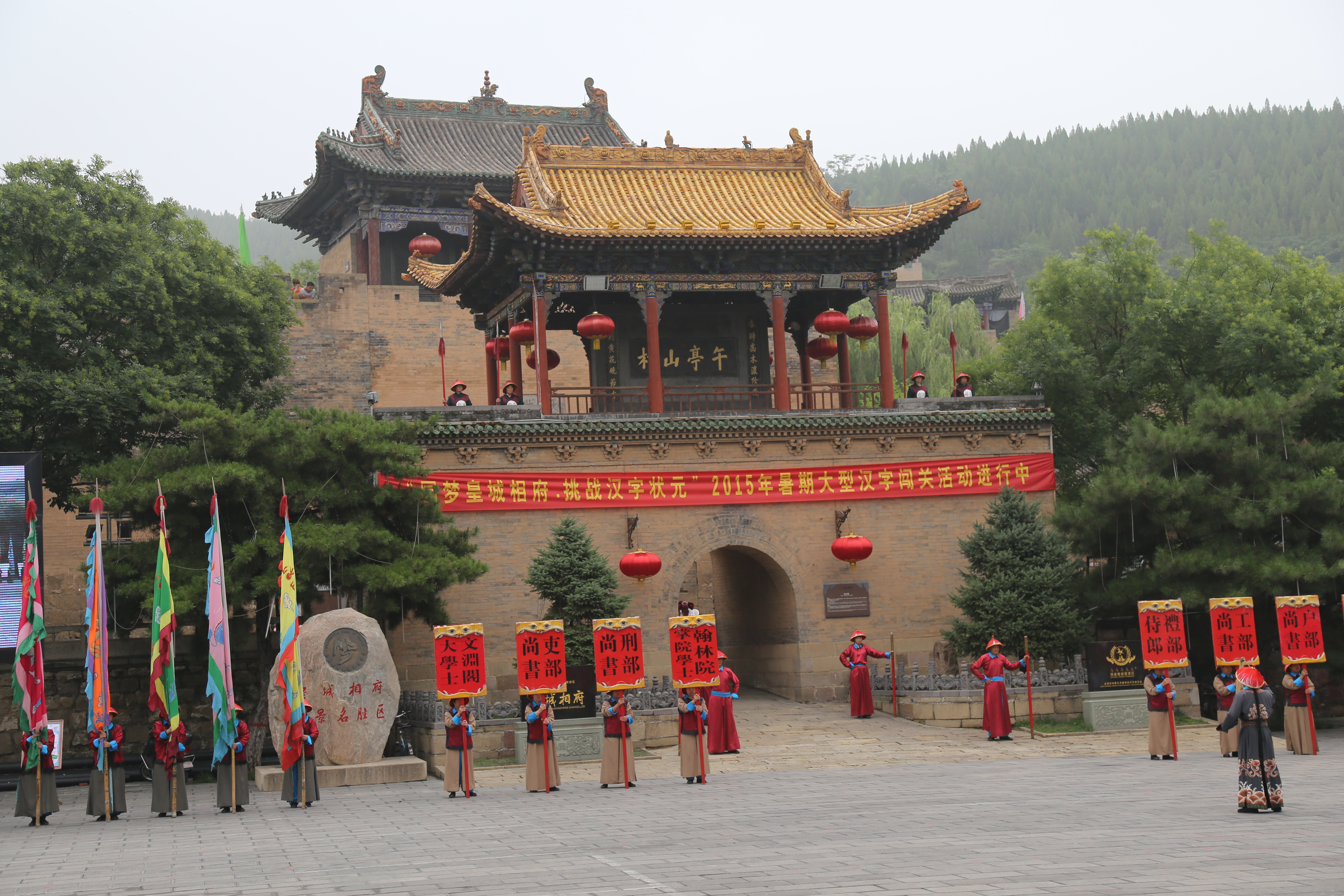
After arriving in Yangcheng, teams had to search outside the House of the Huangcheng Chancellor.

Airdates: August 26, 2012 (ICS); September 1, 2012 (DragonTV)

- Shanghai, China (The Bund) (Starting Line and Elimination Point)
- Shanghai (Gutzlaff Signal Tower) to Yangcheng, Shanxi (House of the Huangcheng Chancellor)
- Yangcheng (Shangzhuang Village (in Chinese))
- Yangcheng (Manghe Scenic Area (in Chinese) – Monkey Park)
- Yangcheng (Manghe Scenic Area – Drinking Horse Spring)

In this season's first Roadblock, one team member had to correctly assemble a bamboo swing for the local macaques using the tools provided to receive their next clue.

Additional tasks

- At The Bund, teams had to search through hundreds of flags and find the flag with the ancient hanzi meaning "One". The first five teams to complete the task were given tickets to the first of two buses which would take them to Yangcheng, the home of the hanzi dictionary. The next five teams were given tickets to the second bus, which would depart 45 minutes later. The last team without the correct flag would not be given tickets to Yangcheng and was eliminated.
- Once teams arrived at Yangcheng, they had to search the entrance of the House of the Huangcheng Chancellor to find their next clue, which instructed teams to follow a path indicated by the chancellor's maidens with lanterns to find an incomplete statue of a dragon. Teams then had to search for one missing section and attach it to the statue to receive their next clue.
- At Shangzhuang Village, teams had to don the traditional costumes of the Han Boat folk dance, which included a decorated boat, and then find the village magistrate with their next clue.

=== Leg 2 (Shanxi → Heilongjiang) ===
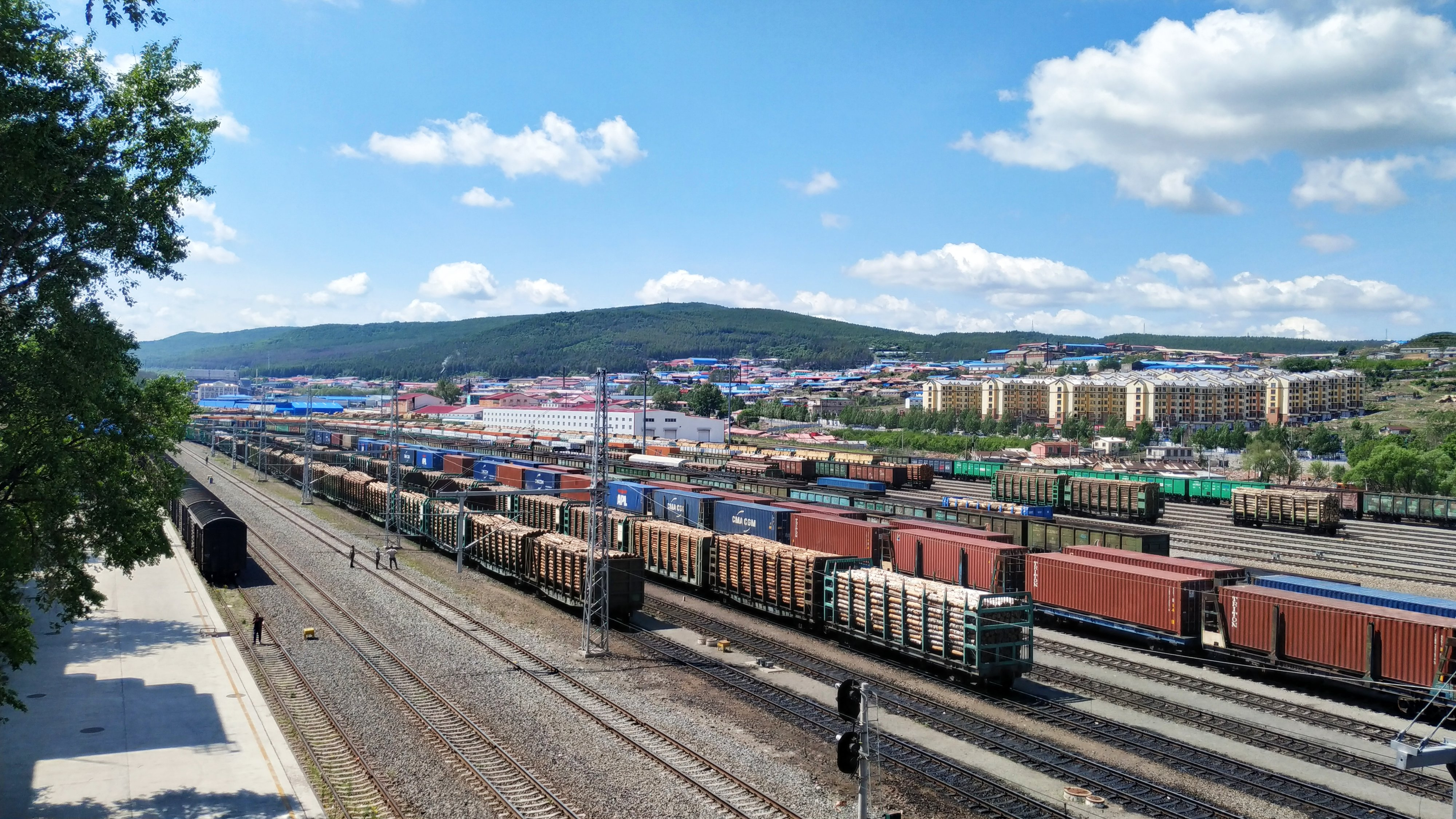
After arriving in the city of Suifenhe, teams traveled to the city's railway station.

Airdates: September 2, 2012 (ICS); September 8, 2012 (DragonTV)

- Yangcheng to Zhengzhou, Henan (Zhengzhou Xinzheng International Airport)
- Zhengzhou (Zhengzhou Xinzheng International Airport) to Mudanjiang, Heilongjiang (Mudanjiang Hailang International Airport)
- Mudanjiang (Mudanjiang Hailang International Airport) to Suifenhe (Xinhua Bridge)
- Suifenhe (Suifenhe Railway Station)
- Suifenhe (Sino-Russian Culture and Arts Exhibition Hall)
- Suifenhe (Beihai Park)
- Suifenhe (Shuangsheng Village)
- Suifenhe (Central Square)
- Suifenhe (Unit 605 Barracks)
- Suifenhe (Suifenhe National Gate)

For their Speed Bump, Henry & Jennifer had to break through a block of ice containing their clue using provided ice picks.

This season's first Detour was a choice between Log It or Slog It. In Log It, teams had to chop enough wood to build a 15 level pile of wood to receive their next clue. In Slog It, teams had to search the forest for a 'singing tree' playing "Kalinka" using just a parabolic microphone and use a shovel to dig up their next clue beneath the tree.

In this leg's Roadblock, one team member had to dress in a military uniform and make a bed by folding a blanket in a military fashion to receive their next clue.

Additional tasks

- At the railway station, teams had to search for a local Russian woman, selling traditional oil paintings with their next clue written on the back.
- At the Sino-Russian Culture and Arts Exhibition Hall, team had to choose one of ten different matryoshka dolls pieces, search the rooms to find the doll missing their piece, and present their complete set to the curator to receive their next clue.

=== Leg 3 (Heilongjiang → Jilin) ===
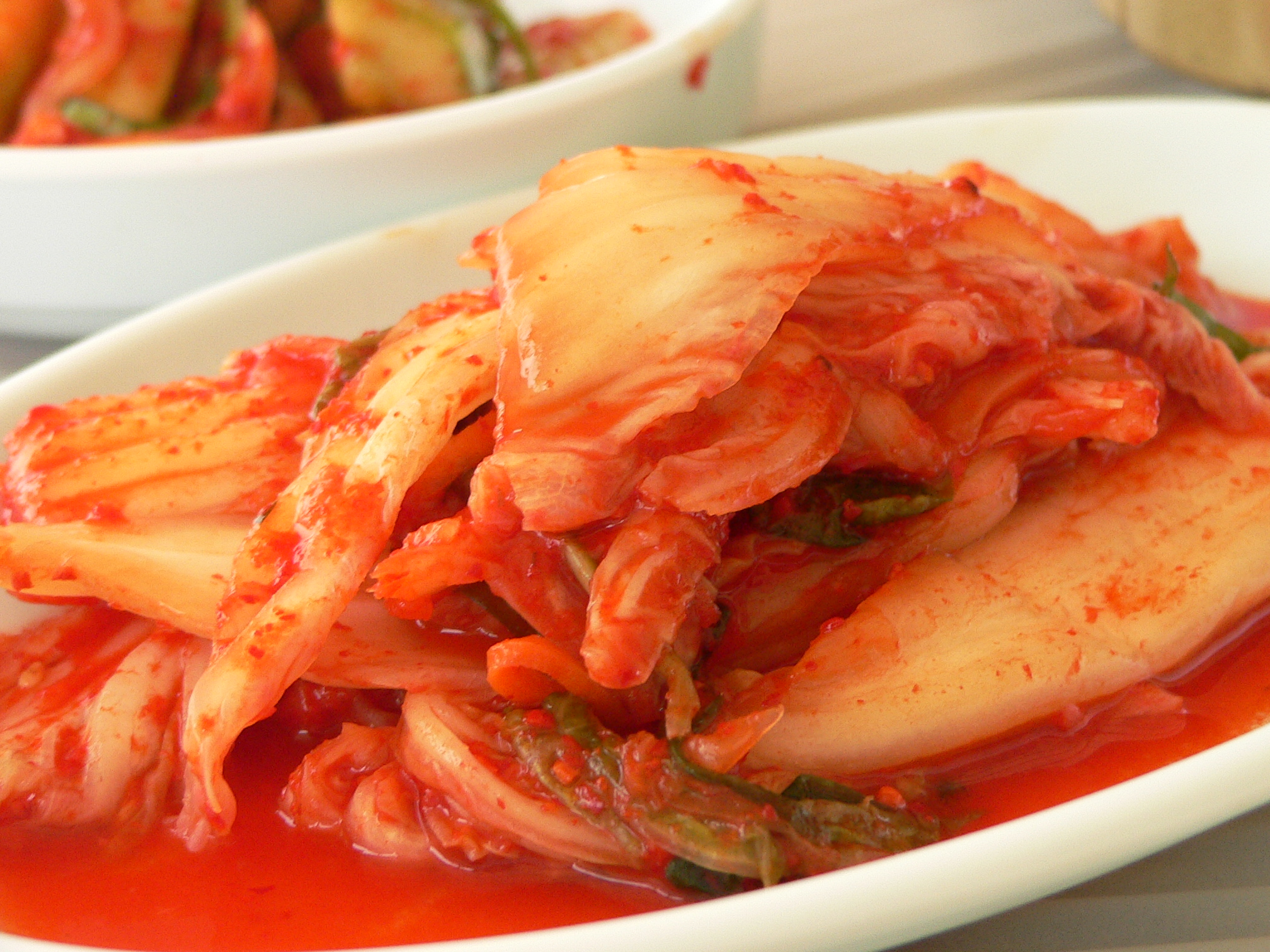
For one of the Detour choices in Yanji, each team member had to consume the popular and spicy Korean dish kimchi.

Airdates: September 9, 2012 (ICS); September 15, 2012 (DragonTV)

- Suifenhe (Suifenhe National Gate) to Yanji, Yanbian Korean Autonomous Prefecture, Jilin
- Yanji (Henan Bridge)
- Yanji (Gongyuan Primary School)
  - Yanji (Tanjun Biological Technology Company)
- Yanji (Korean Folk Culture Village)
- Yanji (Jindalai Square)
- Yanji (Jindalai Cold Noodle Restaurant)
- Yanji (Yanji International Exhibition Art Center)

For this season's only Fast Forward, teams had to travel to the Tanjun Biological Technology Company and find the ginseng drying warehouse, where they had to search through millions of ginseng pieces to find one unique irregular piece. The first team to find said piece would win the Fast Forward award.

This leg's Detour was a choice between Pot Luck or Pot Belly. In Pot Luck, teams had to locate a courtyard with large pots of cabbage. Then, both team members had to transport a pot in a traditional Korean fashion on top of their head across the courtyard and back again, without touching or dropping the pot, to receive their next clue. In Pot Belly, teams had to find a marked cabin, where each team member had to consume 1.2 kilograms (2.6 lb) of hot kimchi to receive their next clue. If a team member vomited, they would incur a 20-minute time penalty.

Additional tasks

- After traveling to Yanji on one of three buses, teams had to take a taxi to Henan Bridge to find their next clue, which had the name of the Gongyuan Primary School and a student ID written in Korean. At the school, teams had to find the student with a matching identification, who would lead them to an area where they had to don traditional Korean outfits. Teams then had to perform several Korean mannerisms correctly to receive their next clue. If teams performed them incorrectly, they would incur a 10-minute time penalty.
- At Jindalai Square, one team member had to stand on a Dano Festival swing, whilst the other pushed, and swing high enough to ring a bell 3 metres (9.8 ft) in the air to receive their next clue. If teams were unsuccessful after 3 attempts, they would incur a 10-minute time penalty before being allowed to attempt the task again.

=== Leg 4 (Jilin → Zhejiang) ===
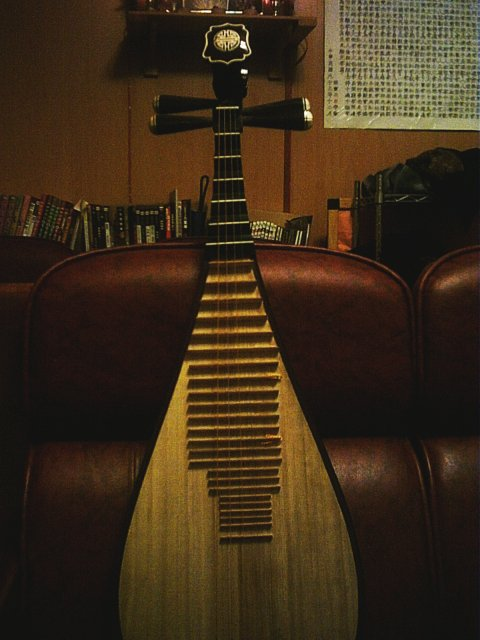
For the Roadblock, one team member had to learn and play a song on a Pipa, a Chinese string instruments, to receive the next clue.

Airdates: September 16, 2012 (ICS); September 22, 2012 (DragonTV)

- Yanji (Yanji Chaoyangchuan International Airport) to Shanghai (Shanghai Hongqiao International Airport)
- Pinghu, Zhejiang (Beiyuan Muchang Park – Water Pavilion) (Overnight Rest)
- Pinghu (Pinghu High School)
- Pinghu (Maji Village)
- Pinghu (Mo Family Mansions (in Chinese))
- Pinghu (Pinghu Folk Culture Museum or Meiyantang Restaurant)
- Pinghu (Shutong Elementary School)
- Pinghu (Nine Peaks Pagoda)

This leg's Detour was a choice between Showdown or Chow Down. In Showdown, teams had to travel to the Pinghu Folk Culture Museum and defeat an opponent in a game of watermelon chess to receive their next clue. In Chow Down, teams had to travel to the Meiyantang Restaurant and create a local delicacy: fermented eggs. Teams had to crack the shells of five duck eggs correctly, and then each team member had to eat one fermented egg to receive their next clue.

In this leg's Roadblock, one team member had to find a marked classroom, learn a famous Pipa song, and perform the song correctly on the Pipa to receive their next clue.

Additional tasks

- After traveling from Shanghai to Pinghu, teams had to make their way to Beiyuan Muchang Park and pick a number which in turn represented what order they would enter the park to search for their next clue.
- At Pinghu High School, the Intersected teams had to work together in a high pressure game of HORSE, in which all 4 team members had to score a basket from 3 designated markers on the court. Finally, one team member had to score a basket from the 3-point line. If the Intersected teams failed to complete the task in under 6 minutes, they would incur a 10-minute time penalty they could attempt the task again. After completing the task, teams were no longer Intersected.
- At the Maji Village farm, teams had to construct a scarecrow, stuff it with hay, place it on a bamboo pole, transport it to a field, and place it in a marked area to the satisfaction of the farmer to receive their next clue.

=== Leg 5 (Zhejiang) ===
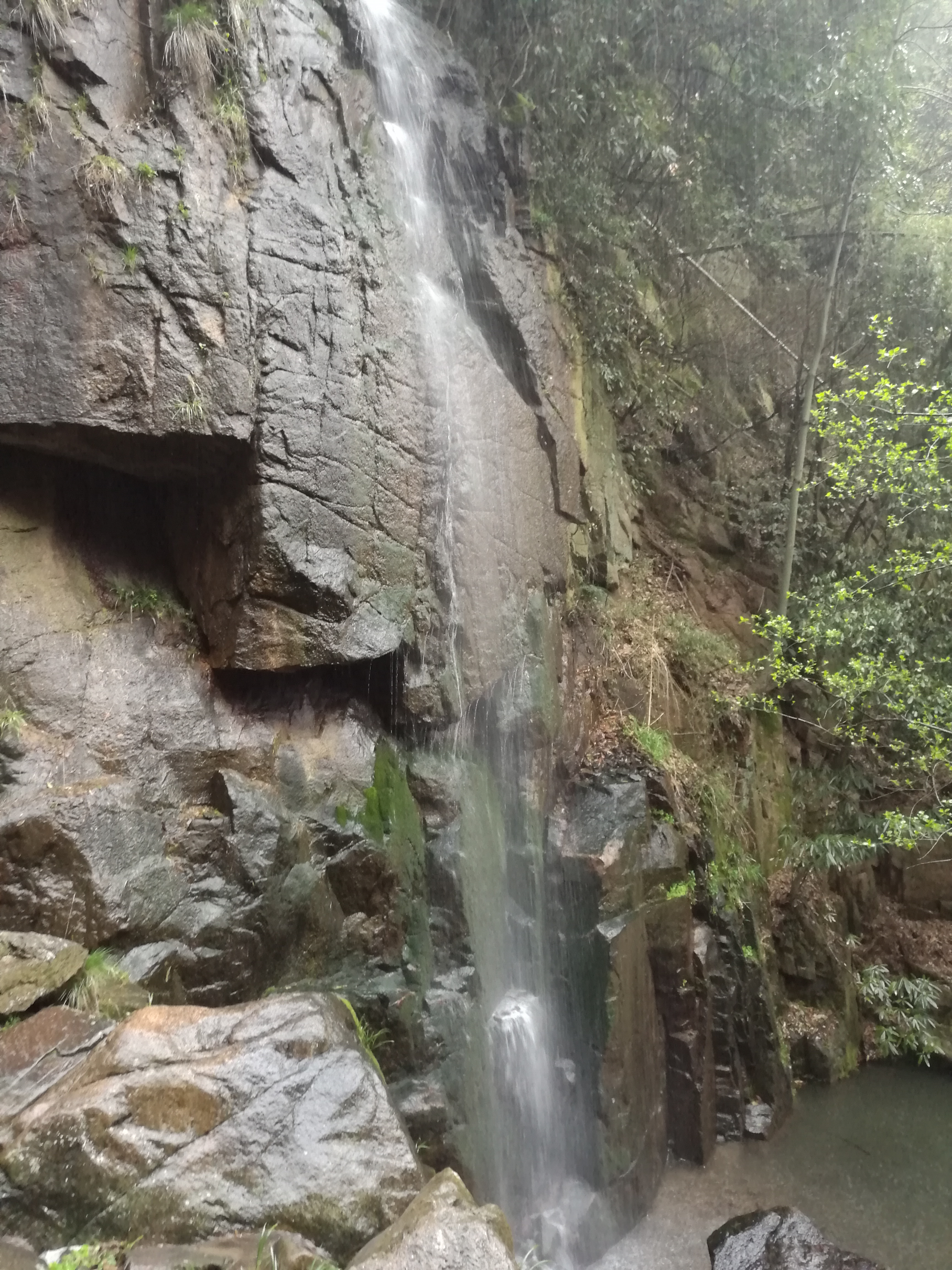
At Sword Stone Pond beneath Moganshan, teams had to clean a sword obtained during the Roadblock.

Airdates: September 23, 2012 (ICS); September 29, 2012 (DragonTV)

- Xinshi Ancient Town, Deqing County (Xinshi Market)
  - Xinshi Ancient Town (De Jiangxing Antique Shop)
- Xianrenkeng (Le Passage Mohkan Shan)
- Moganshan (Dadaowu Reservoir)
- Moganshan (Jianchi Scenic Area – Sword Stone Pond)
- Moganshan (Yin Shan Street Market)

For their Speed Bump, Henry & Jennifer had to find the De Jiangxing Antique Shop, where they both had to eat 1.5 kilograms (3.3 lb) of warm river snails before they could continue racing.

This leg's Detour was a choice between Head Up or Head Down. In Head Up, teams had to search a marked area of a bamboo forest for a clue hidden high above them on selected trees and then retrieve the clue by any means. In Head Down, teams had to make their way by foot to a bamboo forest and transport 12 bamboo poles down a steep path to receive their next clue.

In this leg's Roadblock, one team member had to don a wet suit and scuba gear, learn a series of safety instructions from an instructor, and search the reservoir for a sword stuck in the mud, which had their next clue attached to it.

Additional tasks

- In Xinshi Ancient Town, teams had to select a sheep and then transport the sheep in a boat to a shepherd down the river to receive their next clue. If teams lost the sheep, they would have to restart the task with a new sheep.
- After completing the Roadblock, teams had to travel by taxi with the sword from the Roadblock to Sword Stone Pond, where they had to use a grindstone to clean the rusty sword to reveal the words on the side and receive their next clue.

=== Leg 6 (Zhejiang → Anhui) ===
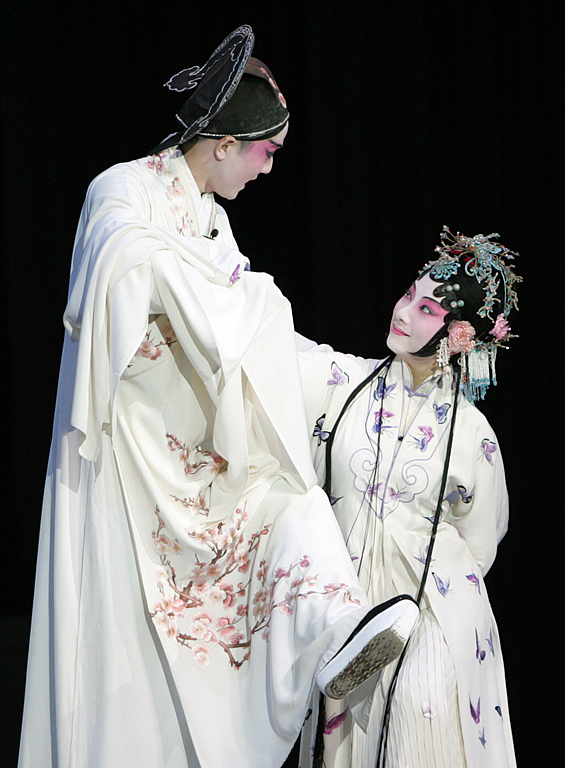
For one of the Detour choices in Huangshan City, each team member had to learn and perform several Kunqu Opera moves.

Airdates: September 30, 2012 (ICS); October 6, 2012 (DragonTV)

- Moganshan (Yin Shan Street Market) to Huangshan City, Anhui (Huangshan City Bus Terminal)
- Huangshan Mountain (Huangshan Scenic Area South Gate)
- Chengkan Village (Five Bridges Entrance)
- Chengkan Village (Luo Family Temple)
- Qiankou (Xiajian Pagoda)
- Huangshan City (Tunxi Old Street or Huang Cuitang Restaurant) (Overnight Rest)
- Huangshan Mountain (Jiulong Waterfall)
- Huangshan City (Pedestrian Rope Bridge)
- Huangshan City (Ancient Stone Mural)

For their Speed Bump, Zhang Yelin & Li Yang had to transport 10 kilograms (22 lb) of hay and grass to the farmer at the opposite side of the village using traditional baskets before they could continue racing.

This leg's Detour was a choice between Food Stall or Performance Hall. In Food Stall, teams had to travel by taxi and by foot to locate a tofu vendor on the east side of Tunxi Old Street and learn how to prepare a local dish called hairy tofu. They would then select a stall and had to sell RMB100 worth of tofu before giving their earnings to their vendor to receive their next clue. In Performance Hall, teams had to travel by taxi to the Huang Cuitang Restaurant, change into traditional outfits, and watch 4 minutes of traditional Kunqu Opera moves before having to perform these moves to the satisfaction of the director to receive their next clue.

In this leg's Roadblock, both team members had to make their way up the mountain path to a marked area. One team member then had to make their way up a steep path to the top of the waterfall, rappel 120 metres (390 ft) down the waterfall into the water, and swim to their next clue.

Additional task

- At the Luo Family Temple, teams had to correctly count the number of characters on the great hall's walls displaying the family code (2421) to receive their next clue.

=== Leg 7 (Anhui → Jiangsu) ===
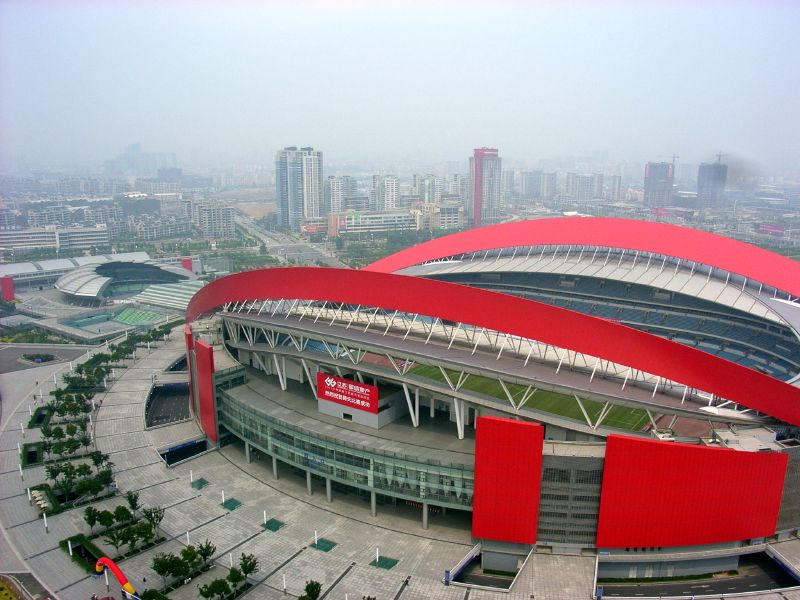
The Nanjing Olympic Sports Center was the Pit Stop for this leg.

Airdates: October 7, 2012 (ICS); October 13, 2012 (DragonTV)

- Huangshan to Nanjing, Jiangsu
- Nanjing (Hilton Nanjing Riverside)
- Nanjing (China Railway Baoji Bridge Group)
- Nanjing (Zifeng Tower – 72nd Floor)
- Nanjing (Nanjing University of Aeronautics and Astronautics)
- Nanjing (Nanjing Olympic Sports Stadium)

In this leg's Roadblock, one team member had to ascend to the 13th floor of the Hilton hotel and put on a chef's outfit. Then they had to properly prepare a signature dish, using only a finished example as a reference, to the satisfaction of the head chef to receive their next clue.

This leg's Detour was a choice between Screw This or Scrap That. Before either task, teams had to don safety gear. In Screw This, teams had to use screws to properly secure 87 sections of a high-speed railway track to receive their next clue. In Scrap That, teams had to fill 14 bins with scrap metal and transport the bins across the large warehouse to a dumping site to receive their next clue.

Additional task

- At the University of Aeronautics and Astronautics, both team members would be strapped into a gravitational rotation device, which would spin them around 360°. While spinning, teams would be shown 10 images of different aircraft and had to pick out images from a board containing 20 images to receive their next clue.

=== Leg 8 (Jiangsu → Taiwan) ===
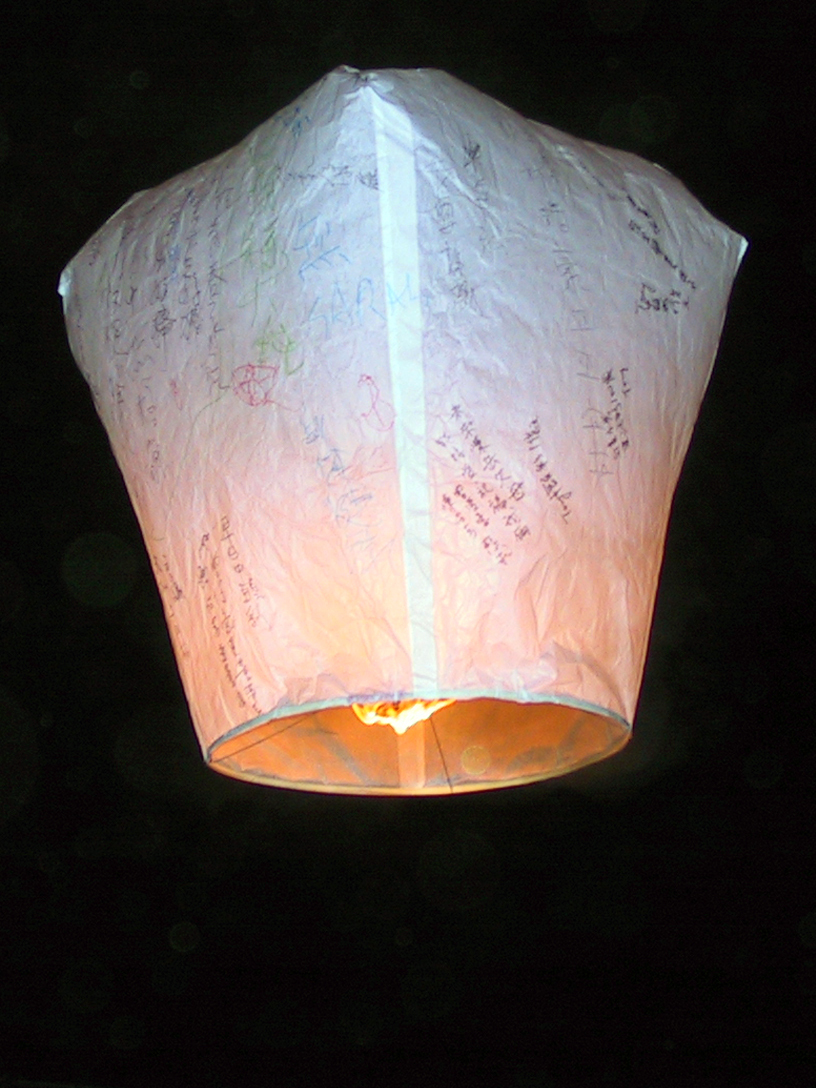
For one of this leg's Detour choices in Taiwan, teams had to create and fly a sky lantern.

Airdates: October 14, 2012 (ICS); October 20, 2012 (DragonTV)

- Shanghai (Shanghai Pudong International Airport – EVA Air Ticket Counter)
- Shanghai (Shanghai Pudong International Airport) to Taipei, Taiwan (Taiwan Taoyuan International Airport) (Overnight Rest)
- Keelung (Badu Train Station) to Pingsi (Shifen Train Station)
- Pingsi (Three Sisters Lantern Shop or Jingan Suspension Bridge)
- Pingsi (Shifen Train Station) to Keelung (Badu Train Station)
- New Taipei City (Feicui Bay (in Chinese) – Beiji Point)
- New Taipei City (Yehliu Geopark)
- New Taipei City (Bali Ferry Docks to Tamsui Fisherman's Wharf)
- New Taipei City (Love Boat Plaza)

This leg's Detour was a choice between Take Flight or Hang Tight. In Take Flight, teams had to follow the train tracks to the Three Sisters Sky Lantern Shop, where they had to assemble a sky lantern out of rice paper, write a wish, and then light the candle at the lantern's base to release it into the sky and receive their next clue. If the lantern didn't fly, teams had to create a new lantern from scratch. In Hang Tight, teams had to make their way to Jingan Suspension Bridge and hang 150 bamboo chimes from the bridge, with teams writing a wish on the final chime, to receive their next clue. If any of the chimes drop into the water, teams would serve a 20-minute time penalty before they could continue.

In this leg's Roadblock, one team member had to wait at the designated area marked with an X, whilst their partner traveled by taxi to a paragliding point and had to paraglide to their teammate below to receive their next clue.

Additional tasks

- At the EVA Air ticket counter, teams found a clue instructing them to purchase tickets on a flight to Taipei.
- Once in Taipei, teams had to stay overnight before heading to Badu Train Station, where they had to purchase tickets to the Shifen Train Station and pick up a China Rush stamp, which teams' Detour judge would use to stamp their clue once they completed the Detour, and their next clue.
- After completing the Roadblock, teams received a cryptic clue with an image of a unique rock formation that they had to figure out was at Yehliu Geopark, where they would search for their next clue.
- At the Bali Ferry Docks, teams had to travel by ferry to the Tamsui Fisherman's Wharf, where they had to search for their next clue.

=== Leg 9 (Taiwan → Guizhou) ===
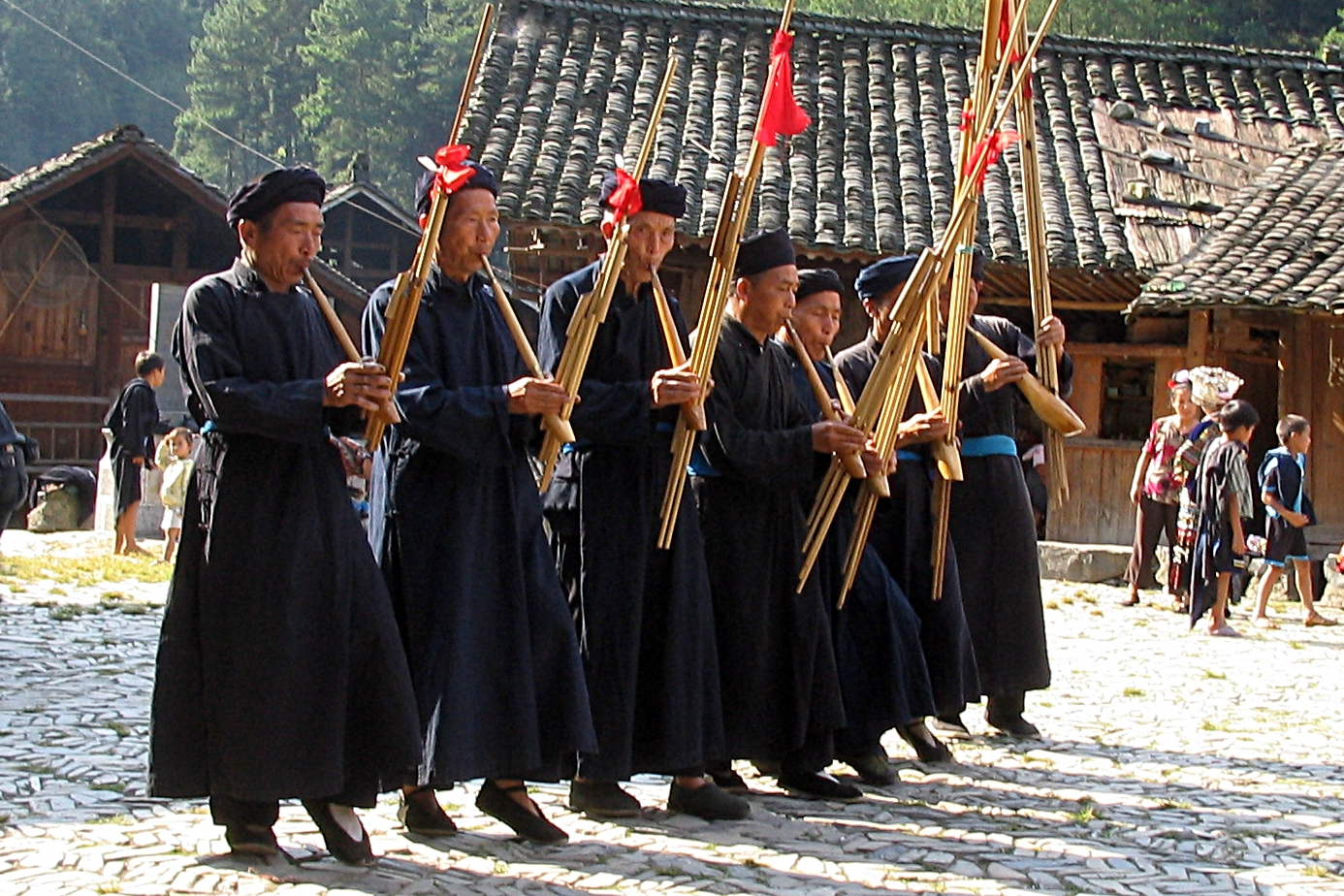
Teams visited Langde Village during this leg in Leishan County.

Airdates: October 21, 2012 (ICS); October 27, 2012 (DragonTV)

- Taipei (Taoyuan International Airport) to Guiyang, Guizhou (Guiyang Longdongbao International Airport)
- Guiyang (Guiyang Longdongbao International Airport) to Leishan County, Qiandongnan Prefecture (Wooden Drum Square)
- Langde Village (Tonggu Ping Square)
- Xijiang Miao Village (Viewing Platform)
- Xijiang Miao Village (Performance Stage)
- Xijiang Miao Village (Village Elder's House)
- Leishan County (Bronze Drum Square)

This leg's Detour was a choice between Catch It or Stack It. In Catch It, both team members had to participate in a Miao wedding tradition by catching 5 live ducks each with their bare hands to receive their next clue. In Stack It, teams had to stack hay into a vertical haystack by following the methods of Miao farmers to receive their next clue.

In this leg's Roadblock, one team member had to assemble a 63-piece puzzle depicting a woman in a Miao wedding costume. They then had to collect the pieces of the wedding costume from a large selection of clothes, present them to the correct bride, and wait for her to change into the outfit before receiving their next clue.

Additional tasks

- At Tonggu Ping Square, teams had to ask a local stunt performer to retrieve their next clue from the top of a ladder made of knives.
- At the viewing platform, teams had to search for a house with an incomplete roof. There, they would participate in another Miao wedding tradition. One team member had to hoist 300 shingles with a pulley to their partner on the roof, who had to completely tile a section of the roof to receive their next clue.
- After completing the Roadblock, teams had to lead their bride to the house of the head of the village, where they would receive a bronze drum with their clue written on the bottom and a Hilton teddy bear, both of which had to be delivered to the Pit Stop.

=== Leg 10 (Guizhou → Yunnan) ===
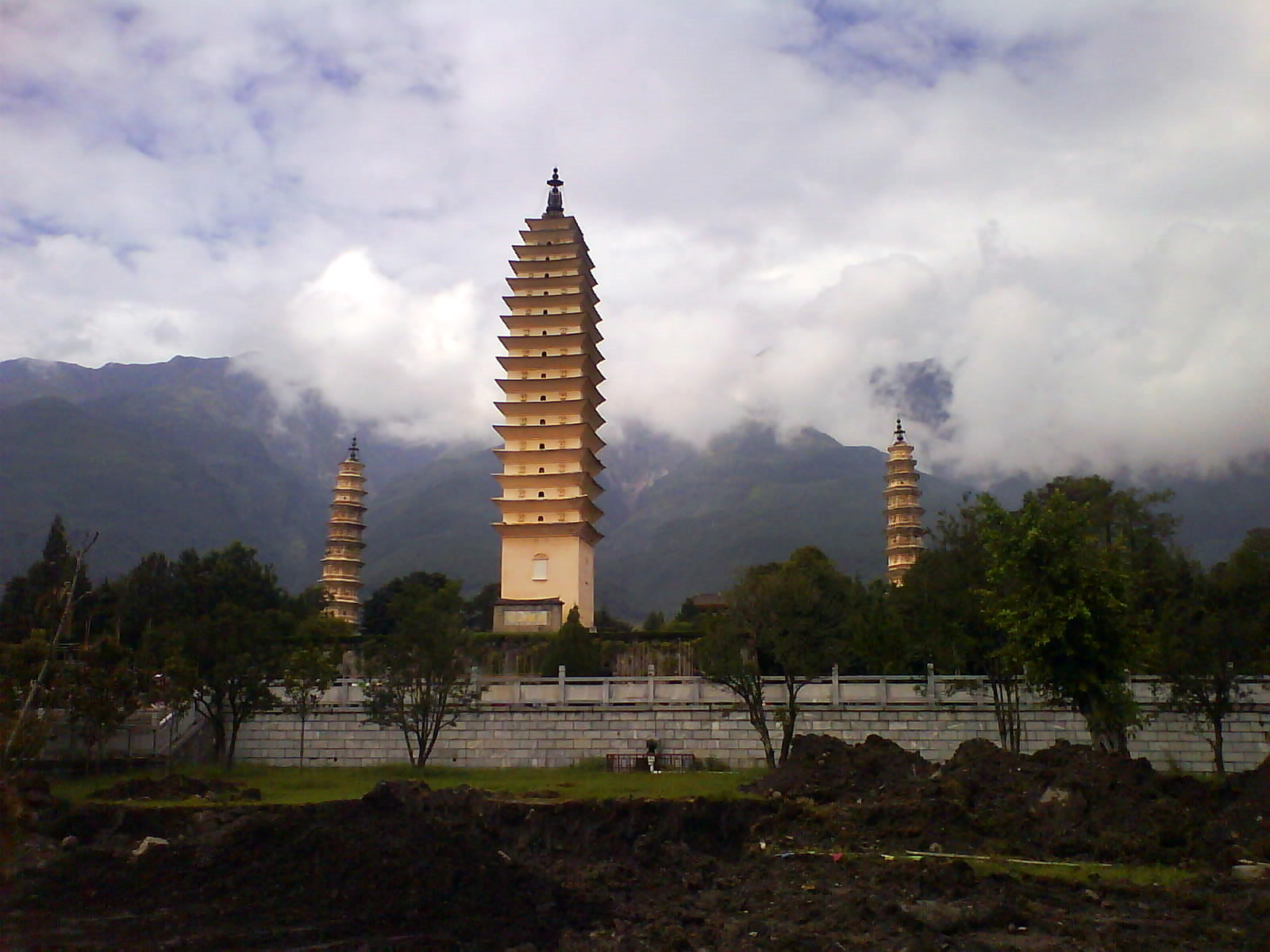
The Three Pagodas Plaza was the Pit Stop for the tenth leg.

Airdates: October 28, 2012 (ICS); November 3, 2012 (DragonTV)

- Leishan County to Dali, Yunnan
- Dali (Erhai Gate)
- Dali (Hengfeng Dairy Farm)
- Dali (Tian Long Ba Bu Cinematic City)
- Dali (Bu'er Fa Gate)
- Dali (Three Pagodas Plaza)

For their Speed Bump, Janelle & Karin each had to drink a pitcher of cow milk before they could continue racing.

This leg's Detour was a choice between Bride or Ride. In Bride, teams had to enter the city and locate six pairs of actors, only one of which was wearing a complete costume. Teams then had to search the studio grounds for 5 missing bridal costume pieces and then dress one actress with the missing pieces to receive their next clue. In Ride, teams had to make their way to the west gate and locate a wanted poster of a fugitive with a list of his crimes. Teams had to memorise the lines and then dress as a jailer and prisoner. The jailer had to transport the prisoner in an ancient paddy wagon to the palace gate, and the prisoner had to correctly recite their crimes to the court official to receive their next clue. If teams performed their lines incorrectly, they had to head back to the wanted poster and restart the task.

In this leg's Roadblock, one team member had to create a square from a seven-piece marble geometric puzzle to receive their next clue and a Hilton teddy bear.

Additional tasks

- At Erhai Gate, teams had to locate a food stall selling a local speciality called Rushan, and then each team member had to consume one stick of Rushan to receive their next clue.
- At the Hengfeng Dairy Farm, teams had to transport 6 baskets of carrots to the cows' feeding troughs. Teams then had to head to the cow pit, where each team member had fill 2 buckets with cow manure and transport them to the compost area to receive their next clue.

=== Leg 11 (Yunnan) ===
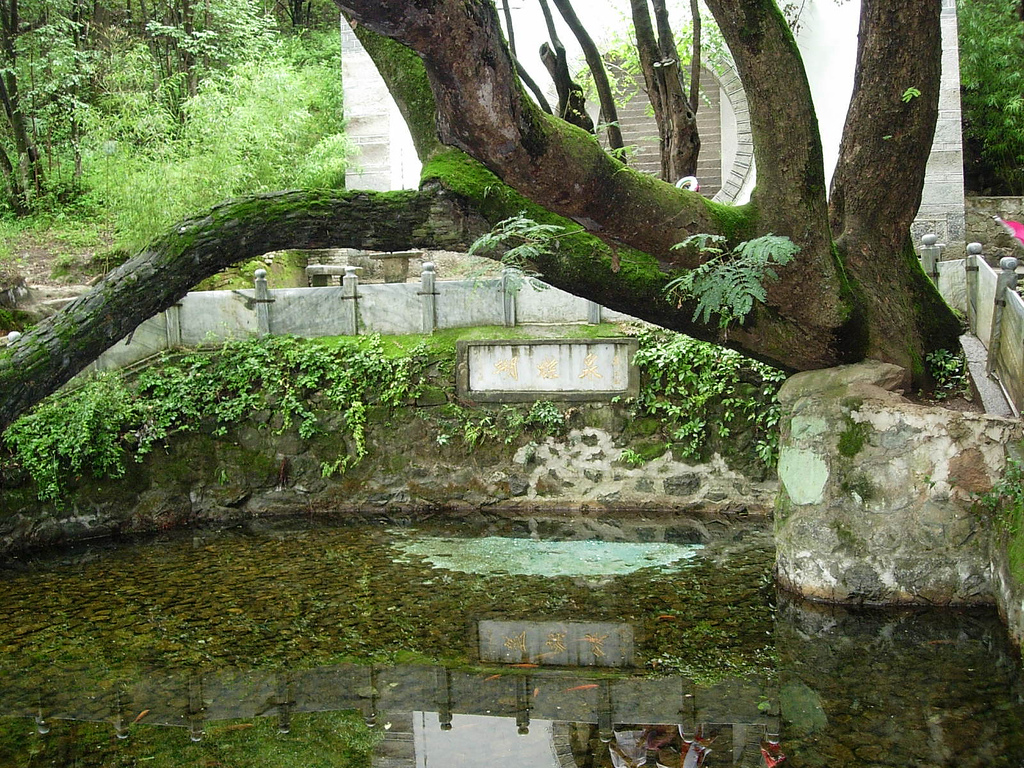
For their second leg in Dali, teams paid tribute to the film Five Golden Flowers by catching butterflies at the Butterfly Spring.

Airdates: November 4, 2012 (ICS); November 10, 2012 (DragonTV)

- Dali (Butterfly Spring (in Chinese))
- Shuanglang Village (Dongshan Rock Field)
- Xizhou (Xizhou Memorial Arch)
- Xizhou (Linden Centre) or Sha Village (Performance Area)
- Xizhou (Xizhou Performance Stage)
- Shuanglang Village (Nanzhao Scenic Island Dock to Nanzhao Island)
- Shuanglang Village (Nanzhao Island – Benzhu Plaza)

In this leg's Roadblock, one team member had to rock climb 15 metres (49 ft) up a vertical rock face to reach a basket of medicinal herbs and deliver them to a shaman to receive their next clue.

This season's final Detour was a choice between Teas or Seas. In Teas, teams had to watch a Bai tea ceremony at the Linden Centre and taste three different teas. They then had to enter a different room and pick out these three teas from a selection of cups using only their senses of taste and smell to receive their next clue. In Seas, teams traveled to the shores of Erhai Lake, where they would have to use a rowboat to deliver a cormorant to a fishing boat on the lake for a basket of fish, which they had to bring back to shore and exchange for their next clue.

Additional tasks

- At the start of the leg, teams received only two dried butterflies in their clue and had to figure out that they had to find Butterfly Spring. There, teams had to use a butterfly net to catch five each of three butterflies listed at the front door of the butterfly garden. They then had to deliver them to two people dressed as the stars of Five Golden Flowers for their next clue.
- At the Nanzhao Scenic Island Dock, teams had to take a Hilton teddy bear and bring it to the Pit Stop.

=== Leg 12 (Yunnan → Sichuan) ===
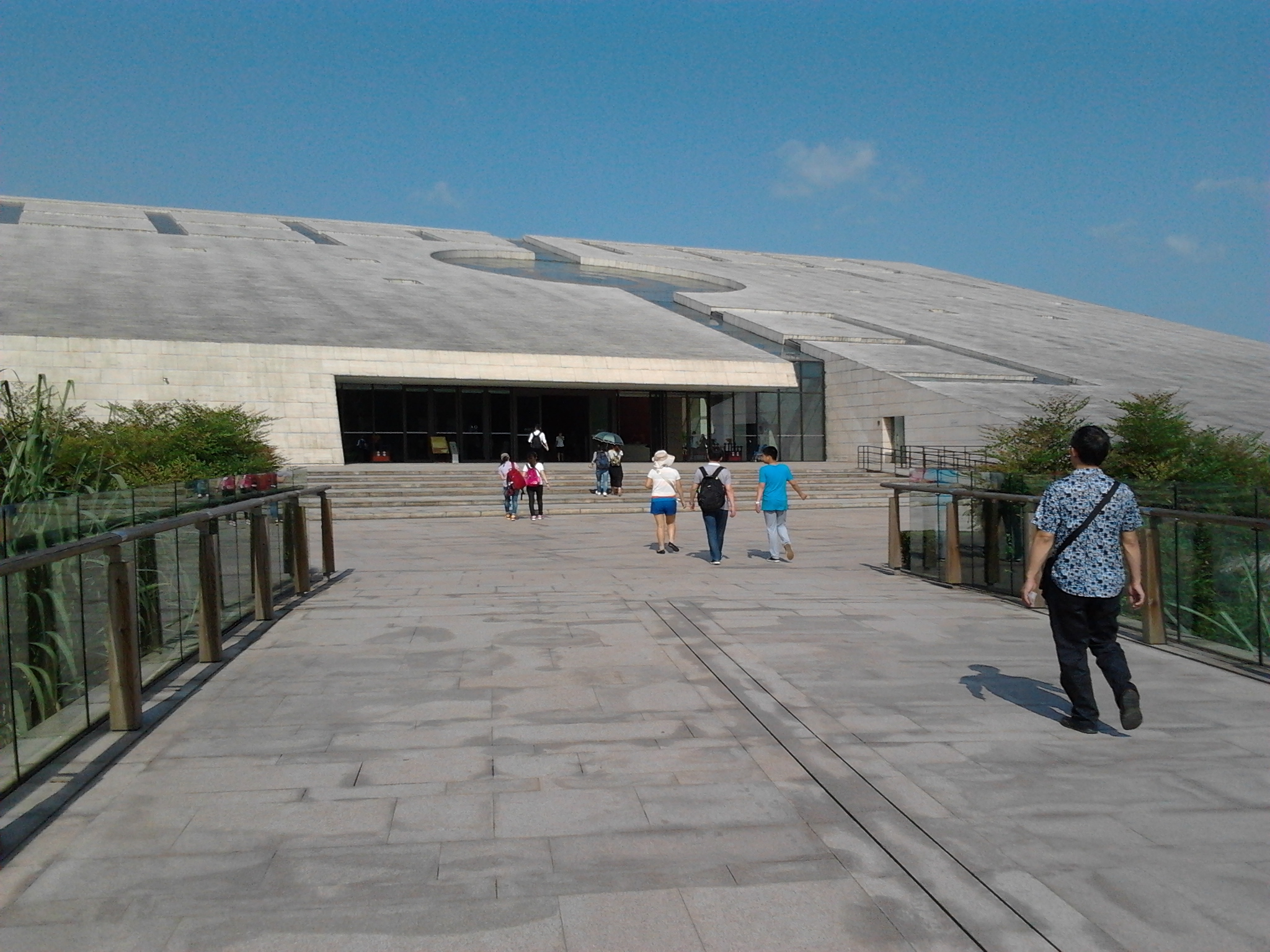
Outside the Jinsha Relics Museum in Chengdu, teams crossed the Finish Line for The Amazing Race: China Rush 3.

Airdates: November 11, 2012 (ICS); November 17, 2012 (DragonTV)

- Dali (Bus Station) to Kunming (Kunming Wujiaba International Airport)
- Kunming (Kunming Wujiaba International Airport) to Chengdu, Sichuan (Chengdu Shuangliu International Airport)
- Chengdu (Huanglongxi Historic Town)
- Chengdu (East Chengdu Music Park)
- Chengdu (Chengdu Research Base of Giant Panda Breeding)
- Chengdu (Wuhouci Temple)
- Chengdu (Jinsha Relics Museum)

In this leg's first Roadblock, teams had to make their way through Huanglongxi Historic Town to Lonpan Square and locate a team of dragon dancers, who each had an image of a previously eliminated team on their arm. The chosen team member then had to dress in a traditional dragon dancer costume and arrange their dancers with the city of the team's elimination listed on the dragon:

Order	City	Team Eliminated
1	Shanghai	Rob & Jia Jia
2	Suifenhe	Nick & Brandon
3	Yanbian	Yu Ping & Yu Chenjing
4	Huangshan	Xiao Bing & Xiao Bang
5	Nanjing	Henry & Jennifer
6	Xinbei	Khai Shing & Khai Sheng
7	Dali	Janelle & Karin
8	Dali	Zhang Yelin & Li Yang

After arranging the dancers, they had to correctly perform a dragon dance as the dragon's tail to receive their next clue.

In this season's final Roadblock, one team member had to tackle the Huarong Path by rearranging several large blocks on a grid to guide the Cao Cao block to the end of the path to receive their final clue.

Additional tasks

- At the East Chengdu Music Park, one team member had to climb up a 60-metre (200 ft) smokestack using a pulley system and their partner belaying to retrieve their next clue.
- At the Chengdu Research Base, teams had to search for Mei Lan's panda pen to find their next clue.
- At the Wuhouci Temple, teams had to search the area for the temple honouring Zhuge Liang, the Martial Marquis of Shu Han, to find their next clue.
