= 16th Golden Rooster Awards =

1996 Chinese film awards ceremony

The 16th Golden Rooster Awards, honoring the best in film, were given on 1996, Kunming, Yunnan province.

== Winners and nominees ==
=== Best Film ===
Red Cherry/红樱桃

- Kong Fansen/孔繁森
- 吴二哥请神
- The Winner/赢家

=== Best Director ===
Wu Tianming - The King of Masks

- Ye Daying - Red Cherry
- Ning Ying - Police Story
- Chen Guoxing/Wang Ping - Kong Fansen

=== Best Directorial Debut ===
Huo Jianqi - The Winner

- Liu Bingyan - The Inkstone-bed
- Zhang Jian Dong - Kite of My Childhood

=== Best Writing ===
not awarded this year

- Si Wu - The Winner
- Fan Yuan/Liu Xiaoshuang - 吴二哥请神

=== Best Actor ===
Gao Ming - Kong Fansen

- Shao Bing - The Winner
- Cao Jingyang - 吴二哥请神

=== Best Actress ===
Song Chunli - Jiuxiang

- Guo Keyu - Red Cherry
- Cao Cuifen - Orphan's Tears

=== Best Supporting Actor ===
Zhao Jun - 吴二哥请神

- Xu Men - The Sorrow of Brook Steppe

=== Best Supporting Actress ===
Zheng Weili - 吴二哥请神

- Jiang Yao - Kong Fansen and Yang Kaihui

=== Best Ensemble Cast ===
Ensemble Cast - The Sorrow of Brook Steppe

=== Best Art Direction ===
Chen Shaomian - Evening liaison

- Liu Xingang/Aori Lige - The Sorrow of Brook Steppe
- Quan Rongzhe - The Inkstone-bed
- Teng Jie - Peach Blossom

=== Best Cinematography ===
Xiao Feng - Evening liaison

- Zhang Li - Red Cherry
- Zhao Lei - The Winner
- Mu Deyuan - The King of Masks

=== Best Editing ===
Zhang Jianhua - The Sorrow of Brook Steppe

- Wang Xiaoming - Red Cherry
- Zhou Ying - 混在北京
- Zhou Xiajuan/Wang Hancheng - 大江东去

=== Best Make-up ===
Chao Ying - The Sorrow of Brook Steppe

=== Best Music ===
Zhao Jiping - Kong Fansen

- Yang Liqing - Red Cherry

=== Best Sound Recording ===
Li Lanhua - Red Cherry

- Zhang Wen - The King of Masks
- Dong Yan - Evening liaison

=== Best Animation ===
Little Heroes/自顾英雄出少年

=== Best Documentary ===
Great Wall/长城

- Chen Jiageng/陈嘉庚
- 难忘辉煌
- 较量！抗美援朝战争实录
