= Expo 2011 =

Expo 2011 Xi'an, officially the Xi'an China International Horticultural Exposition 2011 (Chinese: 2011年中国西安世界园艺博览会) is a horticultural exhibition recognised by the International Association of Horticultural Producers in Xi'an, China to be held between 28 April and 22 October 2011. During the 178-day exhibition, the tourists were anticipated to top 12,000,000. And there are 109 outdoor exhibition houses altogether. Kerry Berry Brogan served as the International Green Ambassador.

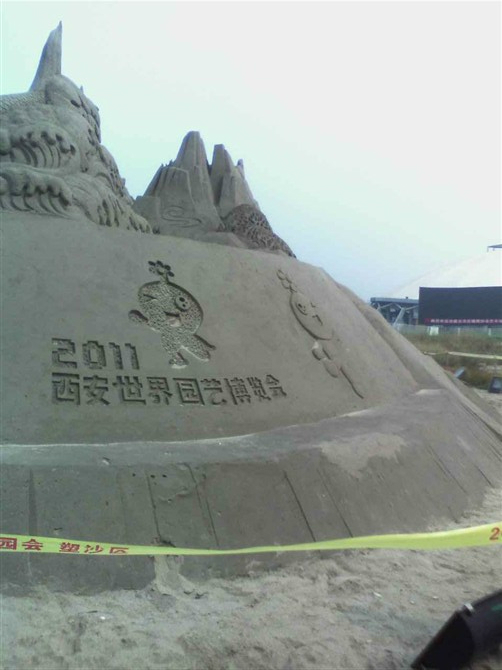

The exposition was originally approved in September 2008.

== Basic information ==
Host Unit: People's Government of Shaanxi Province; State Forestry Administration; China Council for the Promotion of International Trade; China Flower Association

Organizer: Xi'an Municipal People's Government

Hosting City•Province•Country: Xi’an•Shaanxi•China

Opening Time: April 28, 2011—October 22, 2011

Duration: 178 days

Concept: Green Leads the Trend

== Main expo site ==
The main place for the exhibition was Guangyun Lake,(广运潭)in Xi'an, Chan-Ba Ecological District. It used to be one of the main ports in history. In High Tang Emperor Xuanzong of Tang held many large exhibitions and commerce communications here and that is the simple beginning of the similar exhibition in modern days.

== Some independent parks ==
Qinling Park (秦岭园)

Four kinds of the local very valuable animals were shown, they were: the giant panda, the Snub-nosed monkey, Crested ibis and takin. The Qinling Park applied the modern technology and also the classical old time's scenes like the plants and stones to show the typical sights of Qinling. The “Four Treasures of Qinling were shown here.

Chang’an Park (长安园)

The main things shown were the aerospace plant culture, Liu culture, bamboo culture, herb culture, reflecting the latest invention of agricultural science and space plants of Xi'an, Shaanxi; cultural landscape • poetic Chang Park to "The Book of Songs • MAK" in Qin and Tang Dynasty, Wang Wei beautiful poem, "Chuan do Business," a poem mood for the state to rebuild a prominent oriental culture, plant reproduction Book of a new era of elegance in the 21st-century garden.

== Four typical buildings ==
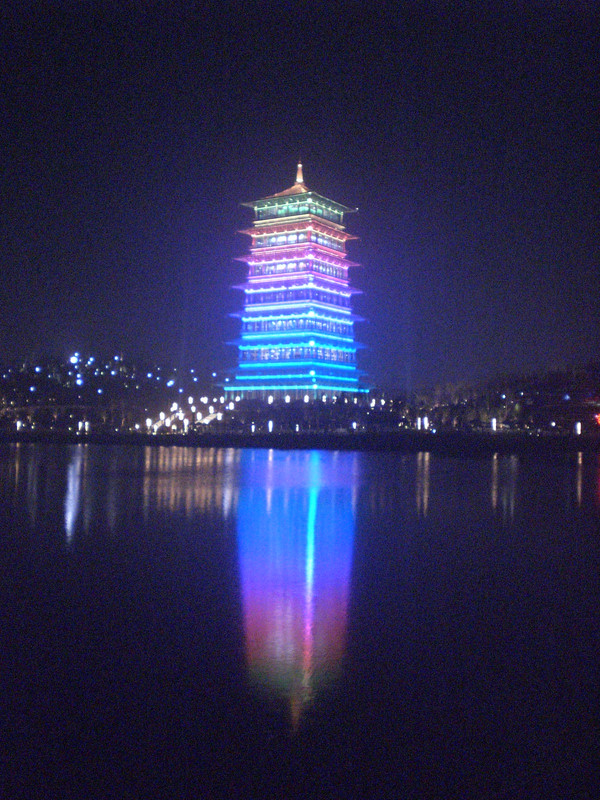

These are the Chang'an Tower (长安塔), Guangyun Gate (广运门), Nature Museum (自然馆) and the Museum of Creativity (创意馆)

Chang'an Tower is located on a mountain and it was the theme site of the 2011 Expo. Also it was used as the viewing tower and visitors could go and see all the beautiful sights in all the parks. It remained the traditional tower's features in the Sui and Tang Dynasty and also applied the modern features. So it showed both the traditional Chinese architecture Culture and the modern city's new elements. It was the perfect combination of green building techniques and architectural art and was built to enhance the architectural culture of Xi'an city and became a landmark

== Theme ==
Eternal peace & harmony between nature & mankind, nurturing the future earth---a city for nature, co-existing in peace (Chinese: 天人长安·创意自然--城市与自然和谐共生).

== The main purpose ==
The Exposition aimed to promote different countries' development of economy, culture and technology. Every country that took part could make use of this opportunity to show its achievements in different fields. Since the first International Horticultural Exposition held in 1851 in London, UK, it has been held 30 times and it is called the "Olympics" in the field of economics. It has brought great economic benefits to the city where it was held and helps to improve the city's construction system.

== See also ==
- Chang'an Flower
- World Horti-Expo Garden
