= Kerry Berry Brogan =

American actress

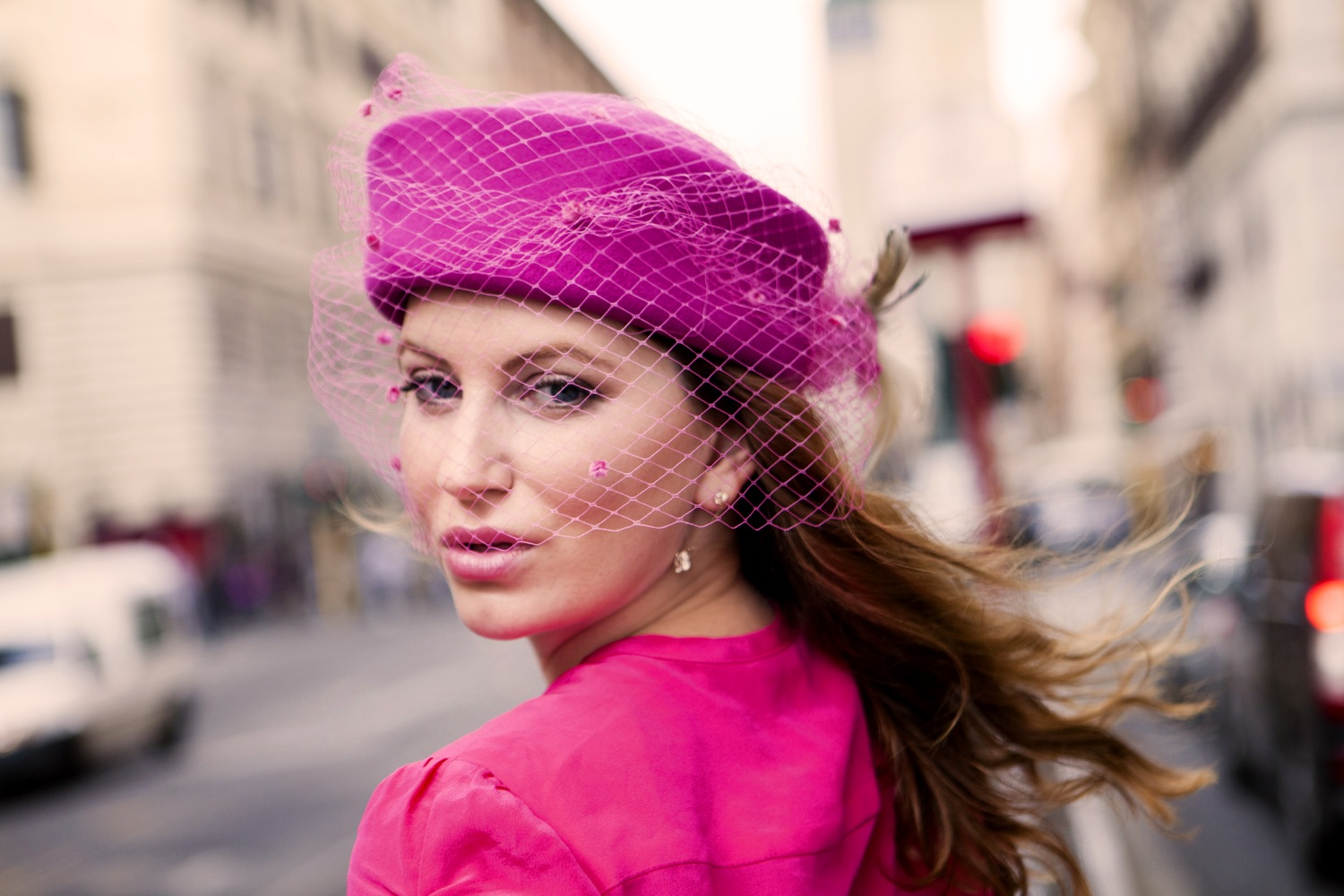
- Born: Newton, Massachusetts, United States
- Education: Bard College
- Occupation: Actress
- Years active: 2002–present

Chinese name
- Simplified Chinese: 凯瑞
Transcriptions
Standard Mandarin
- Hanyu Pinyin: Kǎiruì

Kerry Berry Brogan is an American actress, presently based in Beijing, China. She has appeared in over 50 films and television series in a wide variety of dramatic, comedic, starring and supporting roles. A fluent Mandarin speaker who began studying the language in high school, Brogan has a bilingual website and a popular Chinese-language blog that logged 840,000 hits in just two days before the opening ceremonies of the 2008 Beijing Olympics. She is also a periodic guest and commentator on Chinese prime-time television shows.

Off screen, Brogan has played an active role in promoting east–west cultural exchange, and has received the Sino-American Friendship Award (2009) and the Goddess Artemis Award (2009). She also served as the "International Green Ambassador" for the Xi'an China International Horticultural Exposition 2011, and has been selected for a number of honorary positions including Film Ambassador for New Zealand's Film Auckland and Goodwill Ambassador for the Flying Tigers Historical Organization. In addition to her acting work, Brogan is a celebrity spokesperson for Ruyi Art Pavilion in Guangxi and Aoting Cosmetics in Beijing, and frequently hosts and emcees bilingual cultural events, concerts and product launches for Fortune 500 companies.

In 2012, Brogan established Lotus Ray Media to facilitate film and television co-productions between China, New Zealand and the United States.

== Early life and education ==
Born to Irish-American parents from The Bronx, New York, Kerry Berry Brogan grew up in Newton, Massachusetts. She got her first acting role at the age of 11, when she was cast as Alice in a local theatre production of Alice's Adventures in Wonderland. Bitten early by the acting bug, she appeared in a number of local productions in her junior high and high school years.

When she was 16, Brogan spent several months in Beijing studying Mandarin and living with a local Chinese family as part of the Newton-Beijing Jingshan School Exchange Program. She continued her study of Chinese language and culture as an undergraduate at Bard College in Annandale, New York, where she majored in Asian Studies and appeared in operatic productions such as Pelléas et Mélisande and L'Orfeo. In her second year of college, Brogan spent a semester pursuing advanced performance studies in the Acting Department of Beijing's prestigious Central Academy of Drama. After graduating from Bard College, Brogan returned to China to pursue her acting career full-time. Fluent in Mandarin, Brogan has also studied French and German.

== Acting career ==
Brogan has starred in over 50 films and television series, portraying a diverse range of fictional and real-life characters. Brogan has maintained a steady filming schedule, shooting on location in China and overseas, and often appearing in as many as 10 films and television programs per year.

Memorable film roles include Tricia Nixon in The Master Plan (2011), a film about Nixon's historic visit to China; American martial arts student Lucy in Shaolin Kongfu (2010); the mermaid Dada in Empires of the Deep (2010); Mary in the Chinese western/action film Unusual Love (2009); Hannah, the troubled, drug-addicted daughter of an American businessman in the dark comedy Gasp (2009 film), and journalist Helen Foster Snow in Heart to Heart, a 2008 feature film produced by August 1 Studios.

Notable television roles include Sister Eileen, a French nurse caught up in the Chinese Civil War in The Good Hero (2011); Helen, the wife of an American pilot in the Flying-Tigers-themed series The Great Rescue (2010); secret agent Laney Pierce in Wilting of a Wildflower (2007); Russian Princess Sophia in the Huayi Brothers-produced Qing Dynasty comedy Royal Tramp (2006-7); and Emma, an American orphan raised by a Chinese family in Storm on the River Song (2007).

== Honors and awards ==
Brogan has been involved with a number of organizations dedicated to cross-cultural understanding, and has been recognized for her contributions to promoting east–west friendship. A 2008 front-page, feature article in the Boston Globe praised Brogan for her role as a "Sino-American cultural ambassador." In June 2009, Brogan was awarded the Goddess Artemis Award from the Greek Ministry of Culture and the Euro-American Women's Council (EAWC) for her contributions to international exchange and promoting the role of women in the international market. In October 2009, Brogan became the youngest recipient of the Sino-American Friendship Award, given by the U.S.-China Foundation (USCF).

Brogan also holds a number of honorary ambassador titles. In 2010, she was appointed Film Ambassador by Film Auckland, an industry-led organization that markets Auckland as a film production and post-production locale and provides on-the-ground services for international film and television producers. In 2011, the Flying Tigers Historical Organization (FTHO) named Brogan as their Goodwill Ambassador for her assistance in supporting and promoting the Flying Tigers Heritage Park and Museum in Guilin, China. As "International Green Ambassador" for the 2011 International Horticultural Exposition in Xi'an, China, Brogan promoted eco-awareness among college students through a university-outreach program sponsored by the Expo, and helped to launch an environmentally-themed drawing contest for Chinese and international schoolchildren.

== Spokesperson and endorsement work ==
Since 2009, Brogan has been an image spokesperson for Aoting, a Beijing-based company active in promoting women's health, beauty and lifestyle products and programs. Announcing the choice of Brogan as their celebrity spokesperson, the Chairwoman of Aoting, Yu Xiaoyan, said: "As a leading figure in the global entertainment community, Kerry is the ideal person to represent Aoting's high international standards, improve our brand recognition and raise our profile worldwide." Brogan is also a cultural ambassador for Ruyi Arts Pavilion, a Guangxi-based company that produces hand-carved wooden sculptures and bloodstone statuary based on historical Buddhist figures and themes in classical Chinese literature.

In addition to her work as a spokesperson, Brogan is also a frequent host and emcee for bilingual events, concerts and product launches for Fortune 500 companies including Hewlett Packard, Volkswagen and Volvo.

== Film production and co-production ==
In 2012, Brogan established Lotus Ray Media to facilitate film and television co-productions between China, New Zealand and the United States.

=== Filmography ===
(All films produced and filmed in China unless otherwise noted.)

Year	Title	Role	Director	Production Co.
2014	Old Boys: The Way of The Dragon	Supporting: Jennifer	Xiao Yang	
2011	THE MASTER PLAN	LEADING: Tricia Nixon	Song Jingbo	
2011	DEEP SLEEP NO MORE	LEADING: Annette	Carmelo Musca	Australian Film Bureau
2010	SHAOLIN KONGFU	LEADING: Lucy	Qu Yue	Movie Channel
2010	EMPIRES OF THE DEEP	LEADING: Dada	DIR: Michael French	Fontelysee Prod.
2009	UNUSUSAL LOVE	LEADING: Mary	DIR: Zhang Xin	Ningxia Film Studios
2009	GRADUATION DAY	LEADING: Sophie	DIR: Han Yiyi	
2009	LOOKING FOR LEIFENG	LEAD: Sophie	DIR: Yin Dawei	The Movie Channel
2008	GASP	LEADING: Hanna	DIR: Zheng Zhong	Ciwen Productions
2008	GENE MUTATION	LEADING: Jenny	DIR: Yi Ding	
2008	HEART TO HEART	LEADING: Helen Snow	DIR: He Xiaojiang	August 1 Studios
2008	SMILE WRISTLET	LEAD: Annie	DIR: Pu Jian	
2006	SALVATION OF DONGJI ISLAND	LEAD: Kelly	DIR: Zhang Xin	Lisbon Productions
2006	LITTLE QI FRIEND OF THE SEA	LEADING: Casey	DIR: Qian Xiaohong	Shandong Film Studios
2005	BEIJING LOVE STORY	LEAD: Katie	DIR: Peng Jinsong	The Movie Channel
2004	LOTUS RAIN	LEAD: Helen	DIR: Wang Guoxian	Golden Chang Media
2002	MOON OF STONE	LEADING: Margaret	DIR: Wang Wei	Yunnan Film Productions

=== Television ===
(All television shows produced and filmed in China unless otherwise notes. All series are 20-40 episode miniseries except for "Rediscovering China," a documentary series.)

Year	Title	Role	Director	Production Co.
2011	THE GOOD HERO	LEADING: Sister Eileen	DIR: Zhang Guoqing	
2011	MA YONG ZHEN	LEADING: Lily	DIR: Zhang Qiefeng	
2010	CIVILIAN KING	LEADING: Maria	DIR: Zhang Guoli	
2010	THE GREAT RESCUE	LEADING: Helen	DIR: Xie Gong	
2009	MARRYING IN, MARRYING OUT	LEAD: Jenny	DIR: Xu Qiang	
2009	WOMEN OF THE NEW 4TH ARMY	LEADING: Annie	DIR: Ding Hei	
2008	AWAY AT SEA	LEADING: Madeline	DIR: Zhang Xin	
2007	WARRIORS OF A NEW EMPIRE	LEADING: Katherine	DIR: Pu Zhengmin	CCTV
2007	HEROES OF THE SEA	LEADING: Corazon	DIR: Hu Minkai; CCTV	
2007	STORM ON THE RIVER SONG	LEADING: Emma	DIR: Zhang Shao Guang	CCTV
2007	WILTING OF A WILDFLOWER	LEADING: Laney	DIR: Wangjia	Shenyang Production Studios
2006 – 07	ROYAL TRAMP	Supporting: Princess Sophia	DIR: Yu Min	Huayi Brothers/Wenlin Studios
2006	QI PAO	LEADING: Salya	DIR: Wangzi	
2006	EIGHT BROTHERS	LEADING: Ellen	DIR: Yang Yazhou	Beijing Lianmang Studios
2006	THE 1937 COUP OF XI'AN	CAMEO: Agnes Smedley	DIR: Ye Dayin	Xi'An Production Studios
2006	SWORD STAINED W/ ROYAL BLOOD	CAMEO: Rocklyn	DIR: Zhao Jian	Wenlin Studios
2005	THE PRICE OF PROFIT	LEAD: Alex	DIR: Bate'er	CCTV
2005	MR. LI, MR. GOOD	LEADING: Aimei	DIR: Wang Xiaomin	BTV-4
2005	MOON ON THE DIANCHI RIVER	LEAD: Isabella	DIR: Chen Xie	CCTV-1
2005	DR. NORMAN BETHUNE	LEADING: Sister Herr	DIR: Yang Yang	CCTV
2005	REDACTION HERO TIGER COURAGE	LEADING: Mary	DIR: Yu Liqing	
2004	SANDA FIGHTING KING	LEADING: Jenny	DIR: Hu Linjiao	CCTV
2004	THE WIND BLOWS, THE SKIES PART	LEADING: Jenny	DIR: Liu Xingang	Xinboayuan Movie & T.V.
2004	MOON OVER SHANGHAI	LEADING: Marlene	DIR: Chen Jie, Wang Yongchun	CCTV
2004	JADE OF BLOOD	LEAD: Lucy	DIR: Li Jiaqi	Hairun Online Productions
2003	ODE TO YAN'AN	CAMEO: Helen Snow	DIR: Song Yeming	CCTV-1
2003	THE PEKING INCIDENT	LEAD: Anni the Spy	DIR: Qian Xiaohong	Shandong TV Station
2003	THE ANTAGONIST	LEADING: Lisa	DIR: Zhong Shujia	Eastern Art Studios
2002	WHEN WE WERE STILL YOUNG	LEADING: Helen	DIR: Shi Xuehai	Yunnan Film Productions
2002	AN UNEXPECTED FATE (2 episodes)	LEAD: Nisha	DIR: Sun Yashu	CCTV
2002	REDISCOVERING CHINA	HOST/REPORTER	CCTV-4/9	International Channel
2002	MEETING OF THE CENTURY	LEADING: Nachars	DIR: Wang Wenjie	CCTV-1

=== Stage ===
(All theatre performed in the United States unless otherwise noted.)

YEAR	TITLE	ROLE	DIRECTOR	
2003	SUBURBAN MOTEL	LEAD: Lily Cape	DIR: Skott Taylor	Beijing, China
2000	L'ORFEO (Monteverdi Opera)	PRINCIPAL	DIR: Jeff Sichel	
1998	PELLEAS & MELISANDA (Opera)	PRINCIPAL	DIR: Jeff Sichel	
1997	HARD TIMES	LEAD: Sissy Jupe	DIR: James Honeyman	
1996	HAMLET	SUPPORTING	"Shakespeare & Company"	
1996	THE GOOD DOCTOR	LEAD: Schizophrenic	DIR: James Honeyman	
1995	AS YOU LIKE IT	SUPPORTING	"Shakespeare & Company"	
1994	STATE OF THE ADOLESCENT	LEADING: Lucy	DIR: M. Levy-Spouronnis	
1992	ALICE IN WONDERLAND	LEAD: Alice	DIR: Sashi Kempfmann	
