= Chang'an Flower =

Mascot of 2011 Chinese exposition

Chang'an Flower (Chinese: 长安花; pinyin: Cháng'ān Huā) is the mascot of the Xi'an China International Horticultural Exposition, which was held in Xi'an, China in 2011. The sculpture of Chang'an Flower was unveiled on October 10, 2010, is 3.6 metres (12 ft) tall, and is constructed of fiberglass reinforced plastics.

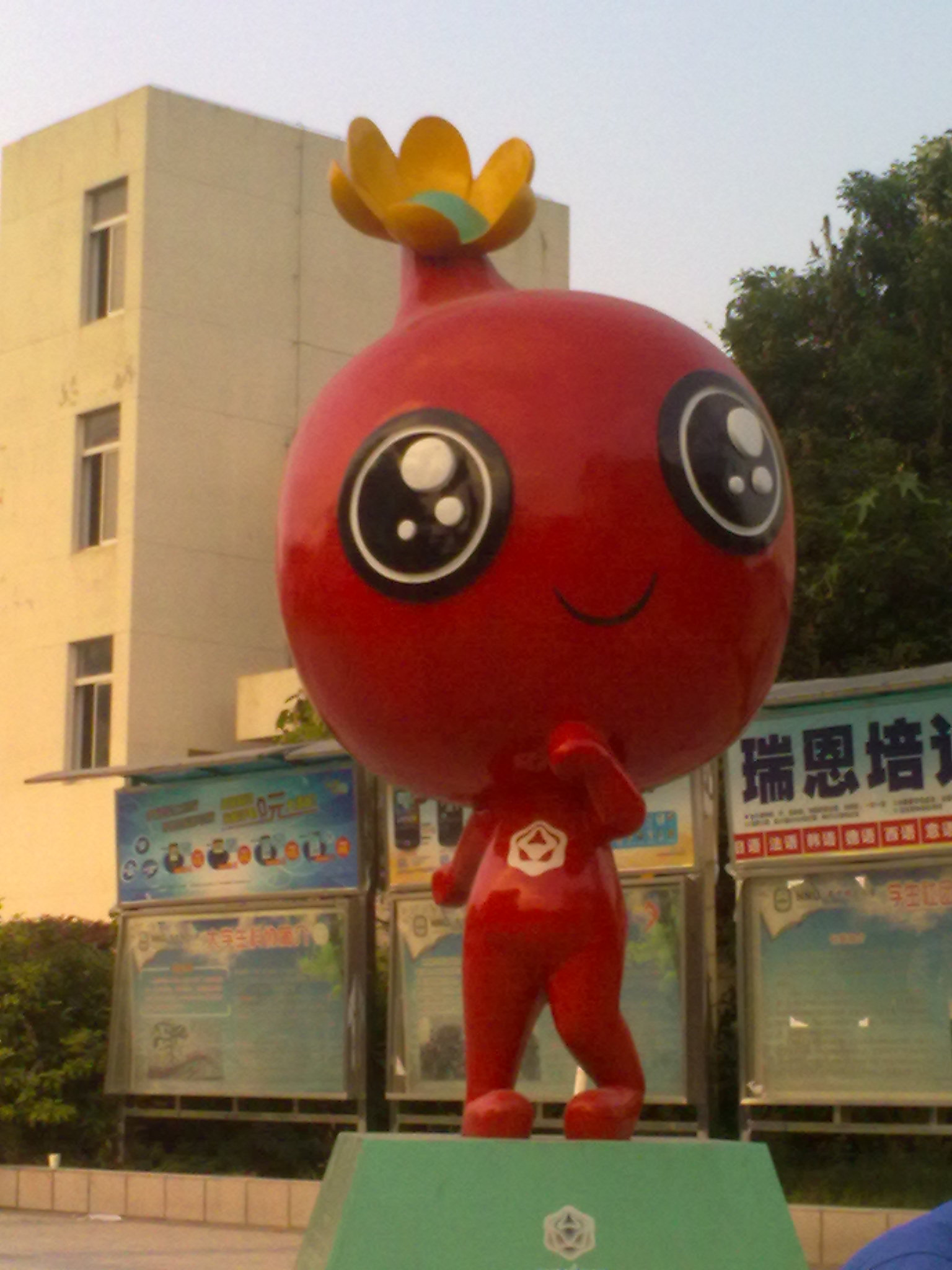
Chang'an Flower is the mascot of the Xi'an China International Horticultural Exposition

== Meaning ==
The Chang'an Flower is shaped like a pomegranate with a flower on top. The pomegranate flower was chosen as the city flower of Xi'an on August 13, 1986. Xi’an was also formerly known as Chang'an in ancient times, hence the “Chang’an” in the mascot's name. Chang'an translates to “forever peace” in English.

The mascot was created to show the harmonious relationship that human beings share with nature. It is red, with a yellow flower on top of its head. It has a cartoon facial expression, big eyes, and small body to emphasize its friendliness and greeting.

The mascot shares a name with the emblem of the Xi'an China International Horticultural Exposition, which was designed by Chen Shaohua and is printed in white on the mascot's red torso. Their name is derived from the poem “After passing the civil service exam” (Chinese: 登科后; pinyin: Dēngkēhòu) by Tang dynasty poet Meng Jiao (Chinese: 孟郊; pinyin: Mèng Jiāo), as it is the phrase "长安花" from the line "春风得意马蹄疾，一日看尽长安花" ("Riding on the crest of success, seeing all the flowers in Chang'an").

The emblem is shaped like a pomegranate flower, composed of concentric lobed rings that also resemble flowers. The innermost “flower” has three petals. Moving outward, the number of petals increases by one for every next ring, a design inspired by the claim in the Taoist text Classic of the Virtue of the Path and the Power that, “The Tao produced One; One produced Two; Two produced Three; and Three produced All things.”

The ring in the center has three petals and is oriented like a triangle, such that it resembles the Chinese character ”人”, which literally translates to people and is representative of civilization, responsibility, and reason. It also represents the seeds of nature. The next ring has four petals and represents the corners of the land of Xi’an and a harmonious living environment. The next ring has five petals to resemble tree foliage and the common five-petalled flower shape, as well as represent the five elements. The outermost ring has six petals to resemble a snowflake and the flow of running water. The concentric rings of the emblem increase in numbers of petals to represent eternal harmony between human activity and the rest of the natural world. The emblem appears on the mascot with the sections in between the lines solidly colored in with alternating red and white.
