= Leishan County =

Leishan County 雷山县
- County
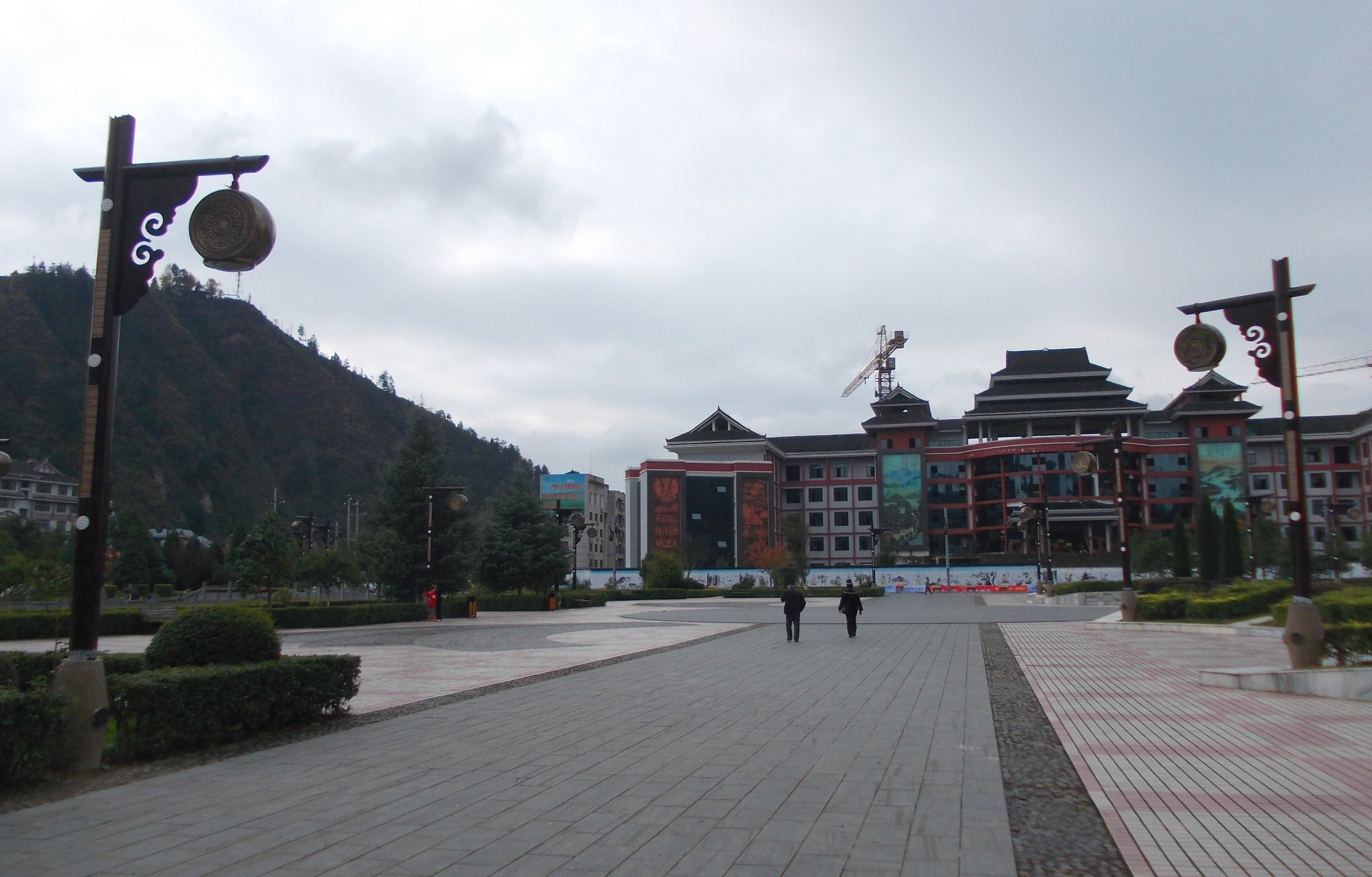

- Location of the seat in Guizhou Leishan (Southwest China)
- Coordinates (Leishan County government): 26°22′46″N 108°04′38″E
- Country: China
- Province: Guizhou
- Autonomous prefecture: Qiandongnan
- County seat: Danjiang

Area
  - Total: 1,218.5 km^{2} (470.5 sq mi)

Population (2010)
  - Total: 117,198
  - Density: 96.182/km^{2} (249.11/sq mi)
- Time zone: UTC+8 (China Standard)

Leishan (Chinese: 雷山; pinyin: Léishān; Hmu: Zangx Xongx) is a county in the east of Guizhou province, China. It is under the administration of the Qiandongnan Miao and Dong Autonomous Prefecture. More than 90% of population are ethnic Hmu (Miao subgroup).

== Administrative divisions ==
Leishan County is divided into 1 subdistrict, 5 towns, 2 townships and 1 ethnic township:

subdistrict

- Longtou Subdistrict 龙头街道

towns

- Danjiang Town 丹江镇
- Xijiang Town 西江镇
- Yongle Town 永乐镇
- Langde Town 郎德镇
- Datang Town 大塘镇

townships

- Wangfeng Township 望丰乡
- Fangxiang Township 方祥乡

ethnic township

- Dadi Shui Ethnic Township 达地水族乡

== Climate ==
It has a subtropical monsoon climate.

Climate data for Leishan, elevation 839 m (2,753 ft), (1991–2020 normals, extremes 1981–present)
Month	Jan	Feb	Mar	Apr	May	Jun	Jul	Aug	Sep	Oct	Nov	Dec	Year
Record high °C (°F)	22.0 (71.6)	28.9 (84.0)	31.9 (89.4)	33.1 (91.6)	32.9 (91.2)	34.3 (93.7)	37.2 (99.0)	35.3 (95.5)	35.1 (95.2)	32.5 (90.5)	28.4 (83.1)	24.7 (76.5)	37.2 (99.0)
Mean daily maximum °C (°F)	8.6 (47.5)	11.9 (53.4)	16.1 (61.0)	21.7 (71.1)	25.1 (77.2)	27.3 (81.1)	29.4 (84.9)	29.6 (85.3)	26.8 (80.2)	21.5 (70.7)	17.2 (63.0)	11.5 (52.7)	20.6 (69.0)
Daily mean °C (°F)	4.8 (40.6)	7.6 (45.7)	11.4 (52.5)	16.6 (61.9)	20.2 (68.4)	22.9 (73.2)	24.6 (76.3)	23.9 (75.0)	21.0 (69.8)	16.5 (61.7)	12.0 (53.6)	6.8 (44.2)	15.7 (60.2)
Mean daily minimum °C (°F)	2.3 (36.1)	4.7 (40.5)	8.2 (46.8)	13.1 (55.6)	16.6 (61.9)	19.9 (67.8)	21.4 (70.5)	20.4 (68.7)	17.3 (63.1)	13.3 (55.9)	8.7 (47.7)	3.8 (38.8)	12.5 (54.5)
Record low °C (°F)	−6.6 (20.1)	−5.7 (21.7)	−3.0 (26.6)	2.7 (36.9)	4.2 (39.6)	10.5 (50.9)	12.8 (55.0)	13.3 (55.9)	8.6 (47.5)	2.7 (36.9)	−3.8 (25.2)	−6.8 (19.8)	−6.8 (19.8)
Average precipitation mm (inches)	37.6 (1.48)	38.8 (1.53)	69.9 (2.75)	116.8 (4.60)	223.8 (8.81)	279.6 (11.01)	196.6 (7.74)	151.2 (5.95)	83.0 (3.27)	88.4 (3.48)	54.5 (2.15)	28.8 (1.13)	1,369 (53.9)
Average precipitation days (≥ 0.1 mm)	14.8	13.1	16.2	16.6	18.6	18.3	17.3	14.9	10.6	12.8	11.1	11.2	175.5
Average snowy days	4.8	2.2	0.6	0	0	0	0	0	0	0	0.1	1.5	9.2
Average relative humidity (%)	82	79	80	80	81	83	80	81	81	83	81	80	81
Mean monthly sunshine hours	34.3	53.0	70.9	95.9	112.2	95.4	151.2	161.6	125.7	87.3	81.9	61.4	1,130.8
Percentage possible sunshine	10	17	19	25	27	23	36	40	34	25	25	19	25
Source: China Meteorological Administration all-time extreme temperature

== Attractions ==
=== Thousand Households ===
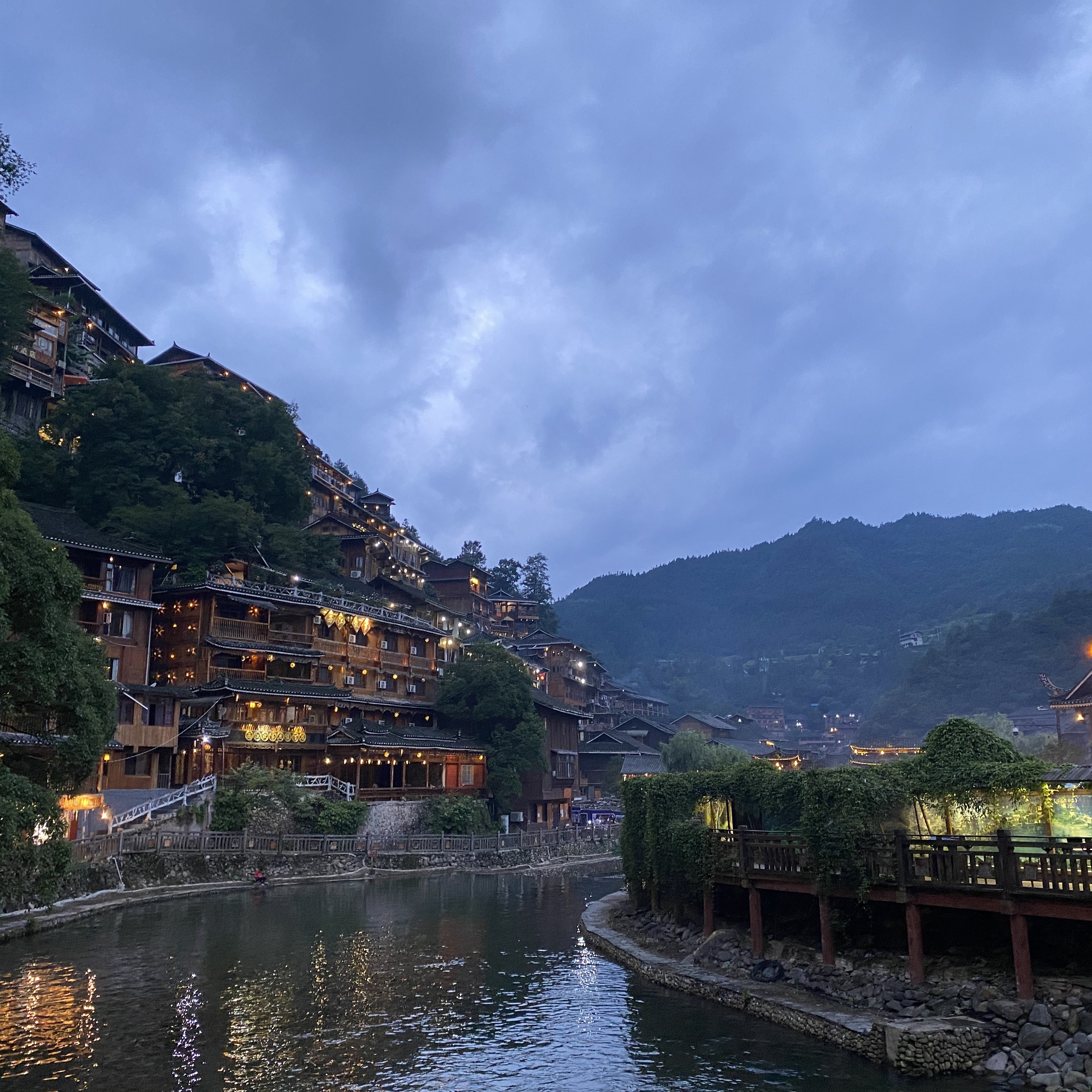
Thousand Households in Xijiang

Miao Stockade Village of Thousand Households (千户苗寨) in Xijiang Town is a famous scenic spot in China.

=== Langde Miao Village ===
Langde Miao Village (朗德苗寨), generally refers to Langde Shang Miao Village, belongs to Leishan County, Qiandongnan Miao and Dong Autonomous Prefecture, Guizhou Province. It is a Miao village with hundreds of families. The ancient buildings of Langde Miao Village are announced as the fifth batch of key cultural relics protection units in China.
