= Liu Xingang =

Chinese film director (born 1962)

Liu Xingang (刘心刚) (born 1962) is a Chinese film director. He also works as a graphic designer and art director, for which he received a Best Art Direction nomination in the 16th Golden Rooster Awards for The Sorrow of Brook Steppe.

== Biography ==
Liu Xingang was born in 1962 and graduated from master course of Arts Central Academy of Drama. Because of his art background, he started his career as an art director. Five Star Hotel is his first work as a director.

== Filmography ==
=== Films ===
- A Sign (2000) as Production Designer
- Da wan (2001) as Production Designer
- Heavenly Grassland (2002) as Art Director
- Shouji (2004) as Art Director
- Last Hour (2008) as Art Department

=== TV Series ===
- I'm Looking Forward to Being Loved (2004) as Director
- The Wind Blows, The Skies Part (2004) as Director
- Biography of Sun Tzu (2010) as Director
