= Jiuxiang Scenic Region =

Scenic area in Yunnan, China

Coordinates: 25°04′34″N 103°20′39″E

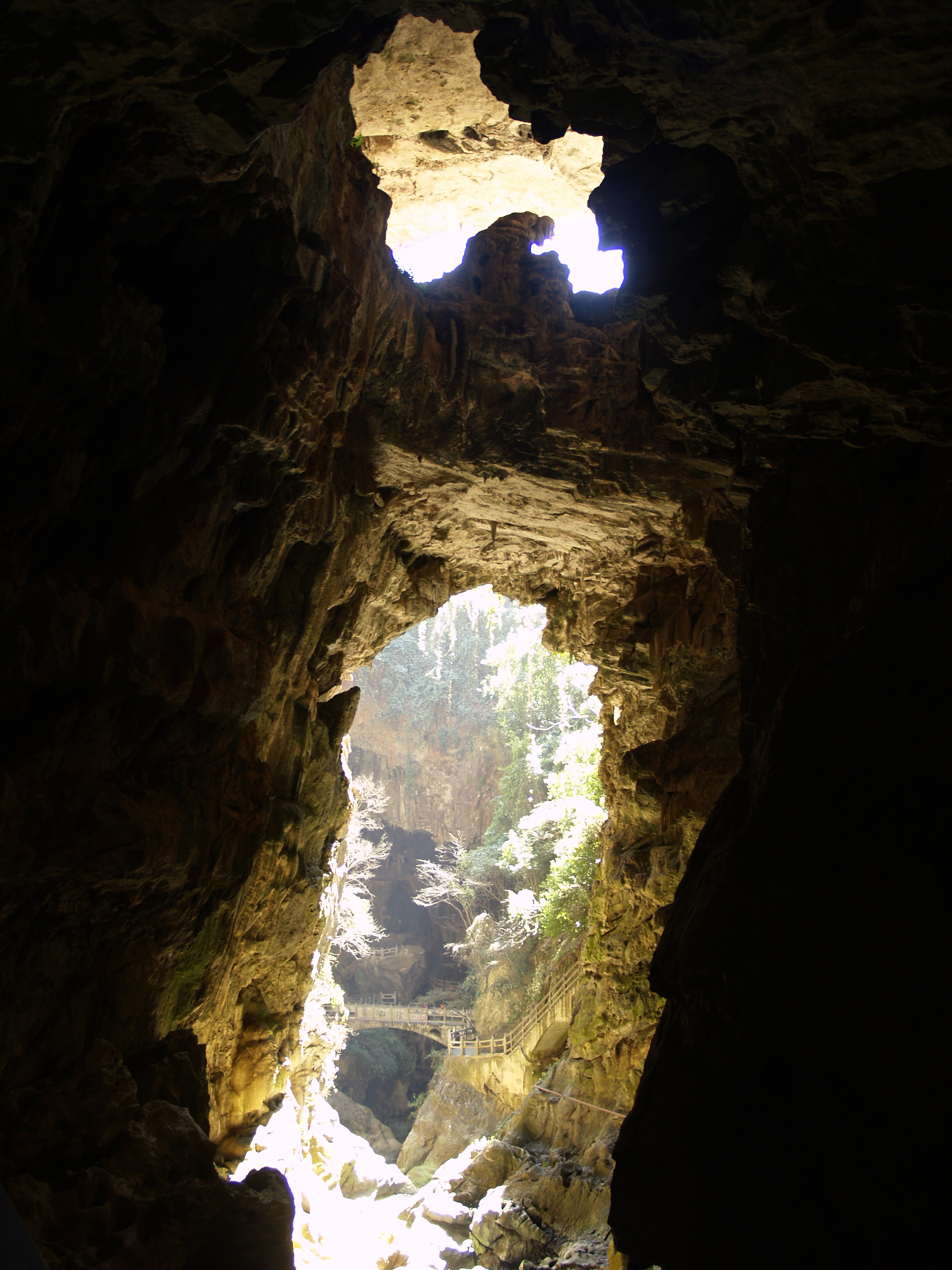
Diehong Bridge, a subterranean natural arch in the Jiuxiang Scenic Region

Jiuxiang Scenic Region (Chinese: 九乡风景区) is located in Jiuxiang Yi and Hui Autonomous Township of Yiliang County 90 km away from central Kunming, Yunnan Province, China. It is famous for its caves, mountains, rivers, deep valleys, minority customs and cultures.

The Jiuxiang Karst Caves are located inside the region. The caves are distributed along the banks of the Maitian River, a tributary of the Nanpan River. The caves are developed in the siliceous limestone strata of the Dengying Formation of the Sinian System. Since the Quaternary Period, the crust has been intermittently uplifted, causing the Jiuxiang Karst Caves to form a multi-layer structure. There is no groundwater in the upper layer, chemical sediments are developed, and there is groundwater in the lower layer. After the top of some caves collapsed, canyons and natural bridges were formed. The main caves include Sanjiao Cave, Xianren Cave, Baixiang Cave, Bat Cave, Dashaba Cave. Some caves were opened as tourist areas in 1989. In 1994, Jiuxiang Scenic Area was listed in the third batch of China's national scenic spots. In August 2009, it was approved as Yunnan Jiuxiang Canyon Cave National Geopark.

Jiuxiang Scenic Region consists of 5 major scenic spots:

- Diehong Bridge (Chinese: 叠虹桥)
- Sanjiao Cave
- Dasha Dam
- Alulong
- Mingyue Lake.

Diehong Bridge itself includes six major scenic spots: the Green Shady Valley, the White Elephant Cave, the Goddess Cave, the Lying Dragon Cave, the Bat Cave and the Tourist Cableway.

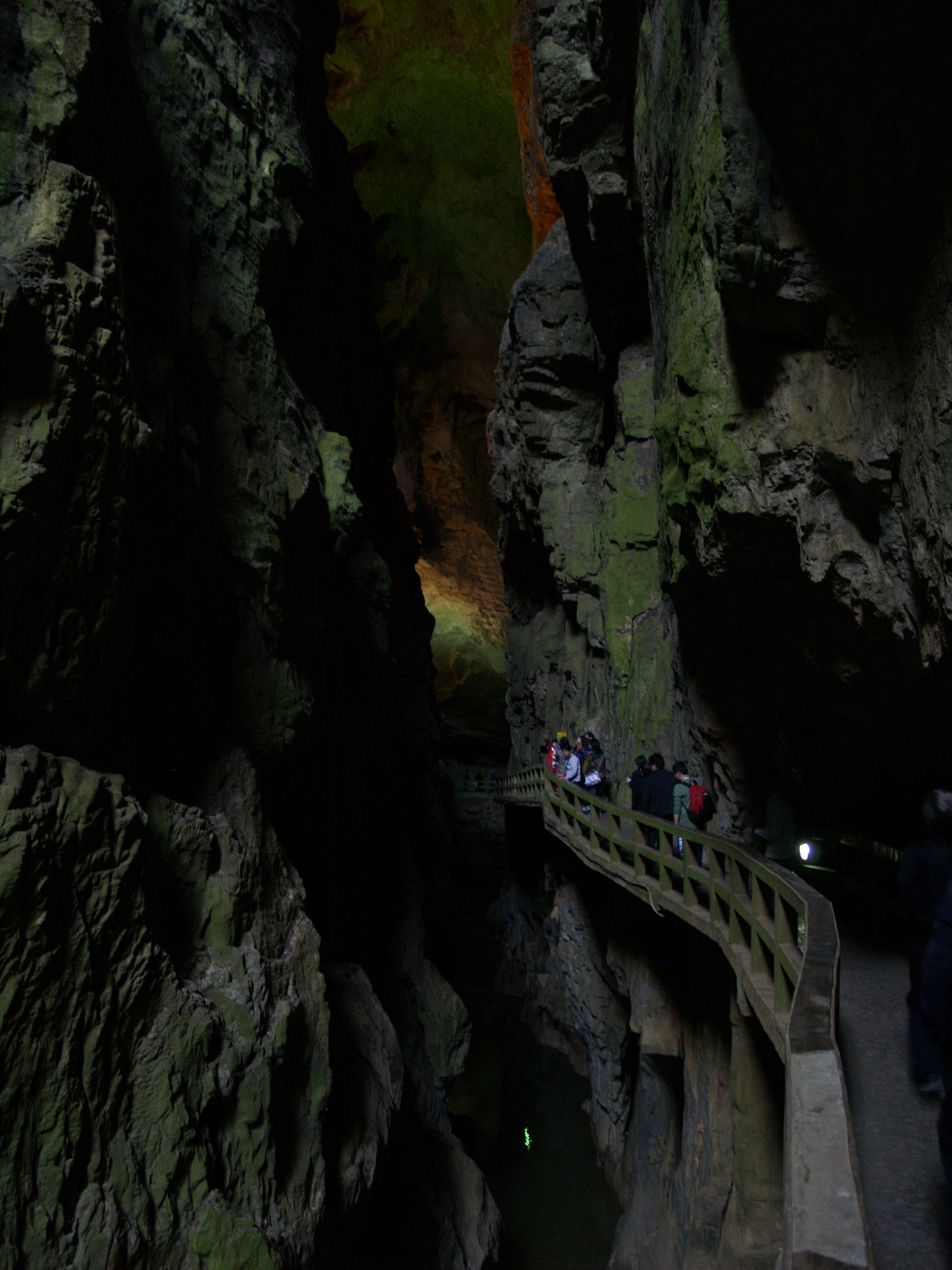
Grand Underground Valley (Chinese: 惊魂峡)

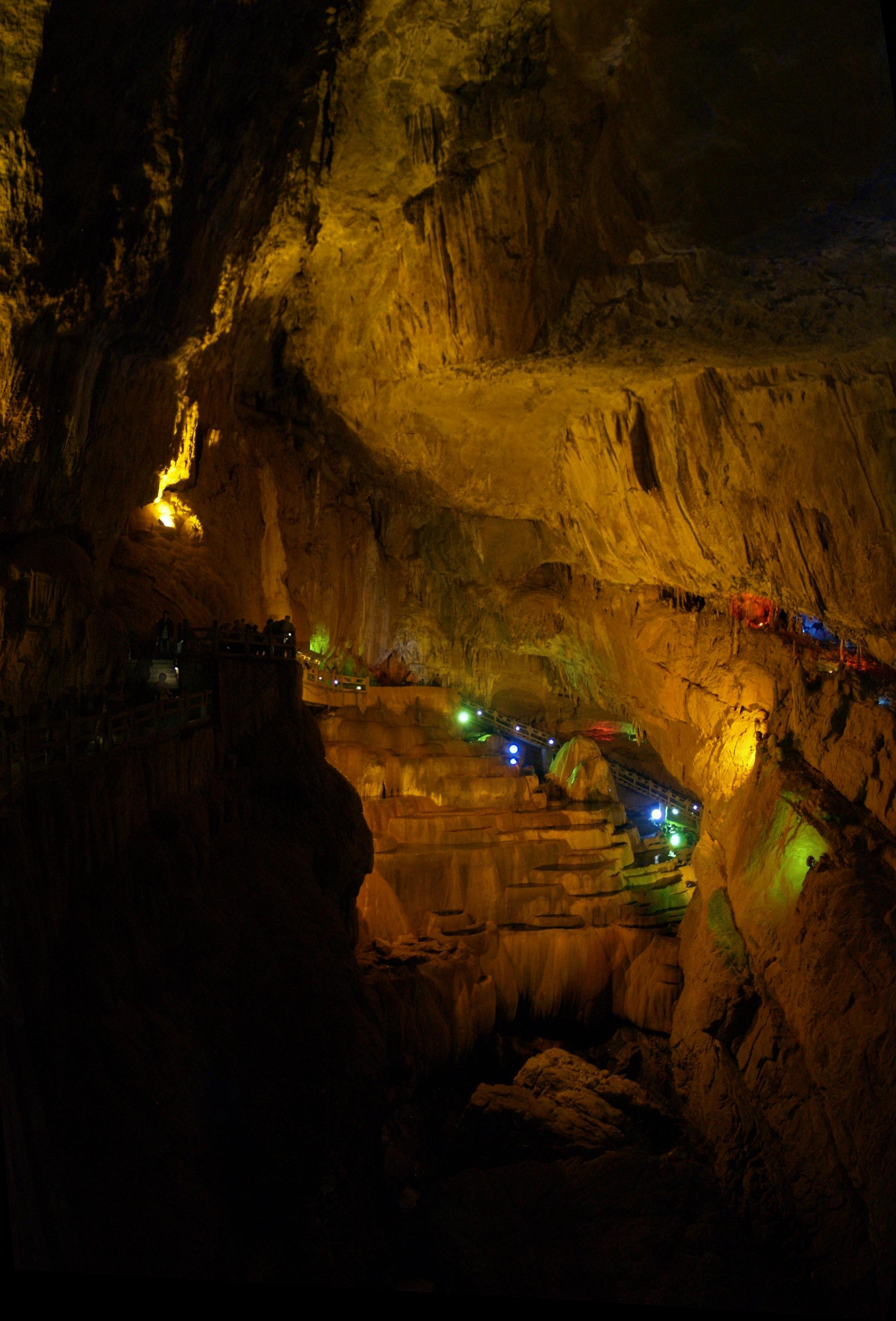
The Fairy Fields (Chinese: 神田), featuring rock formations resembling angel wings
