= Xijiang, Guizhou =

Xijiang 西江镇
- Town
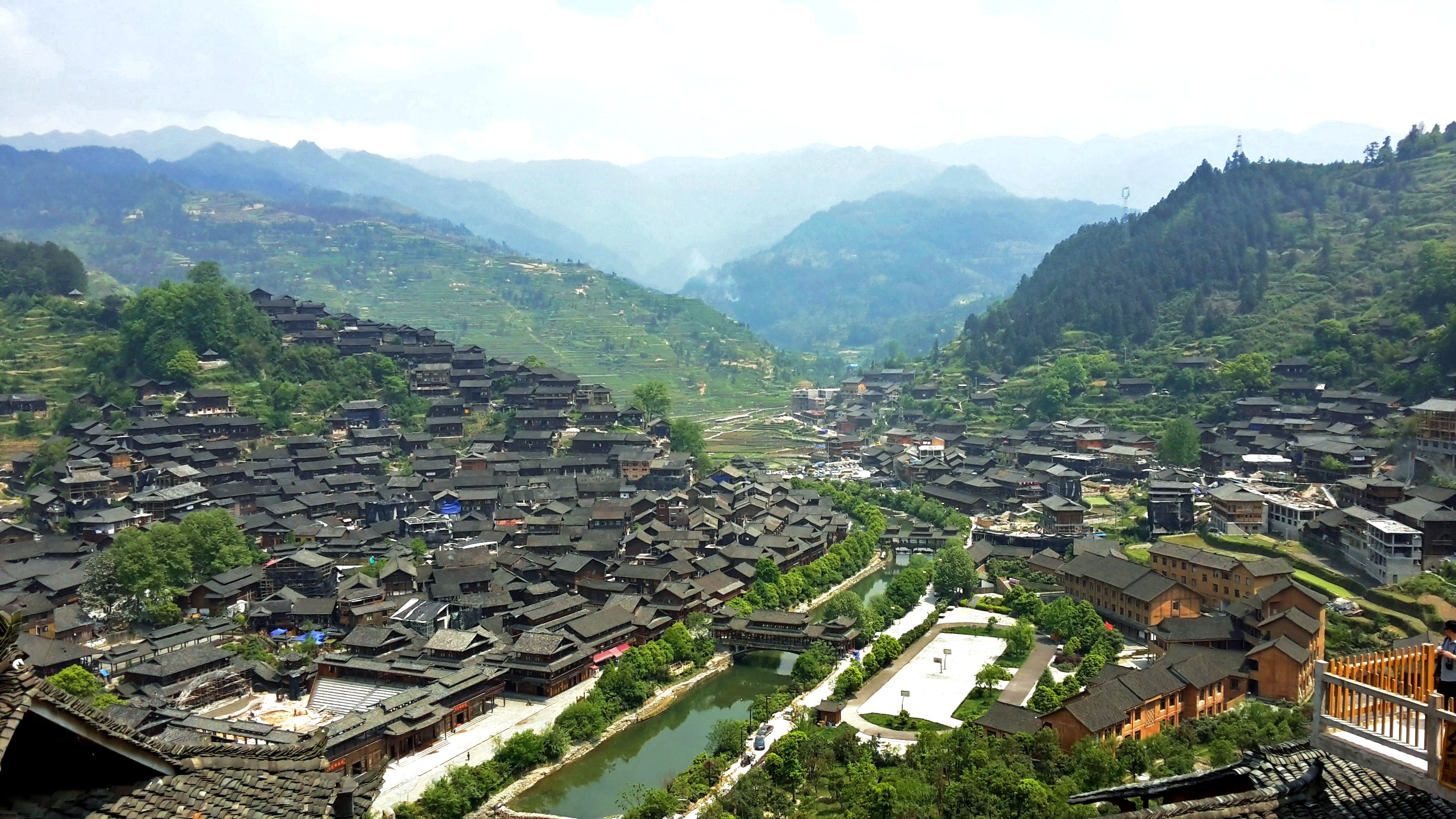
- View of Xijiang

- Location in Guizhou.
- Coordinates: 26°29′48″N 108°10′12″E
- Country: People's Republic of China
- Province: Guizhou
- Prefecture: Qiandongnan Miao and Dong Autonomous Prefecture
- County: Leishan County

Area
  - Total: 187.8 km^{2} (72.5 sq mi)
- Elevation: 833 m (2,733 ft)

Population (2016)
  - Total: 20,000
  - Density: 110/km^{2} (280/sq mi)
- Time zone: UTC+08:00 (China Standard)
- Postal code: 557106
- Area code: 0855

Xijiang (simplified Chinese: 西江镇; traditional Chinese: 西江鎮; pinyin: Xījiāng Zhèn; Hmu: Fangb Dlib Jangl) is a rural town in Leishan County, Guizhou, China. As of the 2016 census it had a population of 20,000 and an area of 187.8 square kilometres (72.5 sq mi). The town is renowned for its Miao Villages and their custom and human relationships. Xijiang Qianhu Miao Village built unique wooden stilted buildings in the middle of the mountain. More than 1,000 stilted buildings are stacked with mountains and peaks as the terrain changes. The main attractions in Xijiang Qianhu Miao Village include Xijiang Miao Museum, Drum Head House, Hulu Head House, Brewing Workshop, Embroidery Workshop, Batik Workshop, Silver Decoration Workshop, Observation Deck, Karge Ancient Road, Pastoral Sightseeing Area, etc. Xijiang Qianhu Miao Village is an open-air museum that displays an epic about the development of the Miao nationality and has become a grandstand for viewing and studying the traditional culture of the Miao nationality.

== History ==
On 14 October 2016, the town was listed among the first group of "Distinctive Towns in China" by the National Development and Reform Commission, Ministry of Finance and Ministry of Housing and Urban-Rural Development.

In November 2017, it was inscribed to the National Civilized Villages and Towns's List.

== Administrative division ==
As of 2016, the town is divided into twenty-one villages and one community:

- Xijiang Community (西江镇社区)
- Changwu Village (长乌村)
- Ganrong Village (干荣村)
- Kaijue Village (开觉村)
- Buzi Village (堡子村)
- Maliao Village (麻料村)
- Kongbai Village (控拜村)
- Wugao Village (乌高村)
- Liancheng Village (连城村)
- Yingshang Village (营上村)
- Baibi Village (白碧村)
- Maobiling Village (猫鼻岭村)
- Longtang Village (龙塘村)
- Beijiang Village (北建村)
- Yangwu Village (羊吾村)
- Zhongzhai Village (中寨村)
- Huangli Village (黄里村)
- Dalong Village (大龙村)
- Xiaolong Village (小龙村)
- Wuyao Village (乌尧村)
- Jiaoyao Village (脚尧村)
- Xijiang Village (西江村)
Xijiang Town, a Miao-majority town in Guizhou.

== Geography ==
It is surrounded by Paiyang Township of Taijiang County on the northeast, Fangxiang Township on the east, Sankeshu Town of Kaili on the west, and Danjiang Town on the south.

== Economy ==
The economy is supported primarily by tourism and Chinese herbal medicine.

The area contains a rich supply of silicon, arsenic, lead, and zinc.

== Transportation ==
S63 is a north-south highway in the town.

== Attractions ==
Miao Stockade Village of Thousand Households (千户苗寨) is a famous scenic spot in China.

== See also ==
- List of township-level divisions of Guizhou
