= Gasp (2009 film) =

- Chinese: 气喘吁吁
- Directed by: Zheng Zhong
- Written by: Heiko Scherm, Zhong Zheng
- Produced by: Liu Xiaodian, Gao Jun
- Starring: John Savage; Kelly Lin; Ge You
- Release date: August 28, 2009
- Country: China
- Language: Mandarin
- Budget: $6 million

Gasp (Chinese: 气喘吁吁) is a 2009 Chinese film directed by Zheng Zhong (Chinese: 郑重).

== Cast ==
- John Savage
- Liang Tian
- Kelly Lin
- Ge You
- Wilson Chen
- Liu Hua (刘桦)
- Zhang Qiufang
- Li Jing
- Ji Lianhai
- Kerry Berry Brogan
