= Fangxiang Township =

Fangxiang Township 方祥乡
- Township
- Location in Guizhou
- Coordinates: 26°26′28″N 108°16′30″E
- Country: People's Republic of China
- Province: Guizhou
- Autonomous prefecture: Qiandongnan Miao and Dong Autonomous Prefecture
- County: Leishan County
- Time zone: UTC+8 (China Standard)

Fangxiang Township (simplified Chinese: 方祥乡; traditional Chinese: 方祥鄉; pinyin: Fāngxiáng Xiāng) is a township in Leishan County, Guizhou, China. As of 2020, it administers the following seven villages:

- Pingxiang Village (平祥村)
- Tixiang Village (提香村)
- Shuizhai Village (水寨村)
- Douzhai Village (陡寨村)
- Queniao Village (雀鸟村)
- Getou Village (格头村)
- Maoping Village (毛坪村)

== See also ==
- List of township-level divisions of Guizhou
