= Fangxiang, Jiangsu =

Fangxiang 方巷镇
- Town
- Location in Jiangsu
- Coordinates: 32°30′23″N 119°23′3″E
- Country: People's Republic of China
- Province: Jiangsu
- Prefecture-level city: Yangzhou
- District: Hanjiang District
- Time zone: UTC+8 (China Standard)

Fangxiang (Chinese: 方巷; pinyin: Fāngxiàng) is a town in Hanjiang District, Yangzhou, Jiangsu, China. As of 2020, it administers two residential neighborhoods (Fangxiang and Huangjue (黄珏)), and the following eighteen villages:

- Fangxiang Village
- Sanliqiao Village (三里桥村)
- Huacheng Village (花城村)
- Kaiyang Village (开杨村)
- Xianjin Village (先进村)
- Qianchong Village (钱冲村)
- Caozhuang Village (曹庄村)
- Chenhua Village (陈花村)
- Zhengda Village (正大村)
- Xingwan Village (兴湾村)
- Miaotou Village (庙头村)
- Yijia Village (裔家村)
- Gongnong Village (工农村)
- Heyu Village (合玉村)
- Limin Village (利民村)
- Lianhe Village (联合村)
- Zhuyu Village (珠玉村)
- Yanhu Village (沿湖村)
