= Amazing Race (French TV series) =

French adventure reality game show

- Presented by: Alexandre Delpérier
- No. of teams: 9
- Winners: Anthony Martinage and Sonja Sacha
- No. of legs: 10
- Distance traveled: 50,000 km (31,000 mi)
- No. of episodes: 10

Release
- Original network: D8
- Original release: 22 October – 24 December 2012

Additional information
- Filming dates: 30 June – 23 July 2012

Amazing Race : la plus grande course autour du monde ! (English: Amazing Race: the biggest race around the world!) is a French reality competition show based on the American series The Amazing Race. Following the premise of other versions in the Amazing Race franchise, the show follows nine teams of two as they race around the world. The show was split into legs, with teams tasked to deduce clues, navigate themselves in foreign areas, interact with locals, perform physical and mental challenges, and travel by air, boat, car, taxi, and other modes of transport. Teams are progressively eliminated at the end of most legs for being the last to arrive at designated Pit Stops. The first team to arrive at the Finish Line wins a grand prize of €50,000.

The show was hosted by Alexandre Delpérier, produced by Shine France for CBS Studios International and in association with ABC Studios (a division of The Walt Disney Company), distributed by The Walt Disney Company France and broadcast on D8. Starting in Paris, teams traveled through the United Arab Emirates, Thailand, Japan, the United States, Brazil, and South Africa before returning to France and finishing in the Paris Region.

The finale aired on 24 December 2012 with cyber-friends Anthony Martinage and Sonja Sacha as the winners, while childhood friends Hadj Semara and Yacim Djabali finished second, and surfers Stéphanie François and Alice Digne finished third.

D8 began airing the season on Monday 22 October 2012, and D17 on Tuesday 23 October 2012, both at 8:50 p.m. CEST (UST+2)

== Production ==
=== Development and filming ===
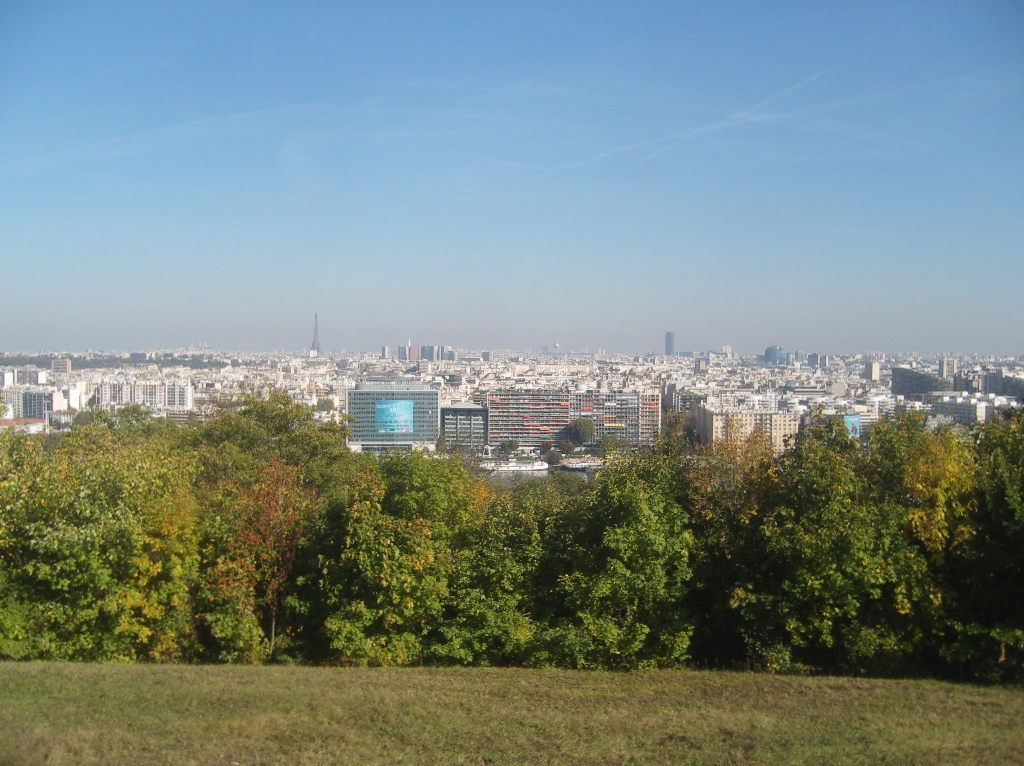
The Starting Line for the inaugural French Amazing Race was at the Rond-point de la Balustrade in the Parc de Saint-Cloud, Paris.

On 23 March 2012, it was announced that Canal+ had acquired the format for a French version of the show. Filming started on 30 June 2012 in Paris. Teams travelled to seven countries for 24 days, spanning over 50,000 kilometres (31,000 mi) in five continents, finishing on 23 July at the Stade de France. This season visited the United Arab Emirates, Thailand, Japan, the United States (making it the first foreign version of the show to visit this country), Brazil and South Africa. Among the highlights are a leg in the streets of Bangkok, an African safari, an excursion to Iguazu Falls and the beaches of Rio de Janeiro. Teams also visited Tokyo, Dubai, Los Angeles, Hawaii and Cape Town.

Unlike its American counterpart, the show is more narrative and informative in content as the show stopped several times throughout each episode to provide viewers with information about the culture and life in the places they visit. Also differing from the American version is that teams are presented their first clue for the next leg at the Pit Stop of the previous leg. The teams are also often told of their next destination at the Pit Stop before they even open these clues. Teams normally don't begin the next leg at the Pit Stop, rather, they are released separately from airports or begin the next leg at hotels they stayed in during the Pit Stop.

=== Casting ===
Applications for the show started 16 April 2012 and ended on 29 May 2012. On 27 September 2012, the teams were announced on Télé-Loisirs.fr.

=== Broadcasting ===
Amazing Race premiered on D8 22 October 2012 and aired each Mondays at 8:30 p.m., with three rebroadcasts on weekends: two on Saturdays at 1:45 p.m. and 10:45 p.m., and one on Sundays at 5:35 p.m. These rebroadcasts were later cancelled due to declining ratings. D17 also offered a rebroadcast of the show on Tuesdays starting 23 October 2012 at 8:50 p.m.

On Friday before the premiere date, D8 posted the first hour of the premiere episode via Dailymotion.

== Contestants ==
Contestants	Age	Relationship	Hometown	Status
Antoine	23	Belgian Couple	Charleroi, Belgium	Eliminated 1st (in Dubai, United Arab Emirates)
Héléna	21	Belgian Couple	Charleroi, Belgium	Eliminated 1st (in Dubai, United Arab Emirates)
Fabien	30	Police Officers	Paris	Eliminated 2nd (in Ayutthaya, Thailand)
Aurélien	30	Police Officers	Paris	Eliminated 2nd (in Ayutthaya, Thailand)
Mathilde	22	Parisians	Garches	Eliminated 3rd (in Kualoa Valley, United States)
Séverine	21	Parisians	Garches	Eliminated 3rd (in Kualoa Valley, United States)
Ouceni Touré	28	Twins	Villetaneuse	Eliminated 4th (in Los Angeles, United States)
Lassana Touré	28	Twins	Villetaneuse	Eliminated 4th (in Los Angeles, United States)
Francis Boutleux	54	Father & Son	Calais	Eliminated 5th (in Rio de Janeiro, Brazil)
Benjamin Boutleux	27	Father & Son	Calais	Eliminated 5th (in Rio de Janeiro, Brazil)
Heïdi	32	Bikers	Alpes-Maritimes	Eliminated 6th (in Stellenbosch, South Africa)
Michel	54	Bikers	Alpes-Maritimes	Eliminated 6th (in Stellenbosch, South Africa)
Stéphanie François	29	Surfers	Pau	Third Place
Alice Digne	31	Surfers	Pau	Third Place
Hadj Semara	24	Childhood Friends	Maubeuge	Second Place
Yacim Djabali	25	Childhood Friends	Maubeuge	Second Place
Anthony Martinage	29	Cyber-Friends	Paris	Winners
Sonja Sacha	33	Cyber-Friends	Paris	Winners

== Results ==
The following teams are listed with their placements in each leg. Placements are listed in finishing order.

- A red placement with a dagger (†) indicates that the team was eliminated.
- An underlined blue placement with a double-dagger (‡) indicates that the team was the last to arrive at a Pit Stop in a non-elimination leg.
- An italicized and underlined placement indicates that the team was the last to arrive at a Pit Stop, but there was no rest period at the Pit Stop and all teams were instructed to continue racing.
- A brown ⊃ indicates that the team used the U-Turn and a brown ⊂ indicates the team on the receiving end of the U-Turn.

Team placement (by leg)
Team	1	2	3	4	5	6	7	8	9	10
Anthony & Sonja	2nd	5th (Note: Anthony & Sonja and Heïdi & Michel initially arrived 5th and 6th, respectively, but were issued a 5-minute penalty for taking a taxi to Wat Arun instead of the ferry. This did not affect their placement.)	7th‡⊂ (Note: Oucéni & Lassana chose to use the U-Turn on Anthony & Sonja.)	2nd	1st	2nd	3rd	4th‡	2nd	1st
Hadj & Yacim	3rd	3rd	6th	6th	4th	5th	1st	3rd	1st⊃ (Note: Hadj & Yacim chose to use the U-Turn on Heïdi & Michel.)	2nd
Stéphanie & Alice	5th	2nd	4th	3rd	5th	3rd	4th	1st	3rd	3rd
Heïdi & Michel	1st	6th	3rd	1st	3rd	4th	2nd	2nd	4th†⊂	
Francis & Benjamin	7th	4th	2nd	5th	2nd	1st	5th†			
Oucéni & Lassana	8th (Note: Oucéni & Lassana lost their key for the Pont des Arts task. They were able to continue racing, receiving a new key, but incurred a 20-minute penalty once they landed in Dubai.)	1st	1st⊃	4th	6th†					
Mathilde & Séverine	4th	7th	5th	7th†						
Fabien & Aurélien	6th	8th†								
Antoine & Héléna	9th†									

== Race summary ==
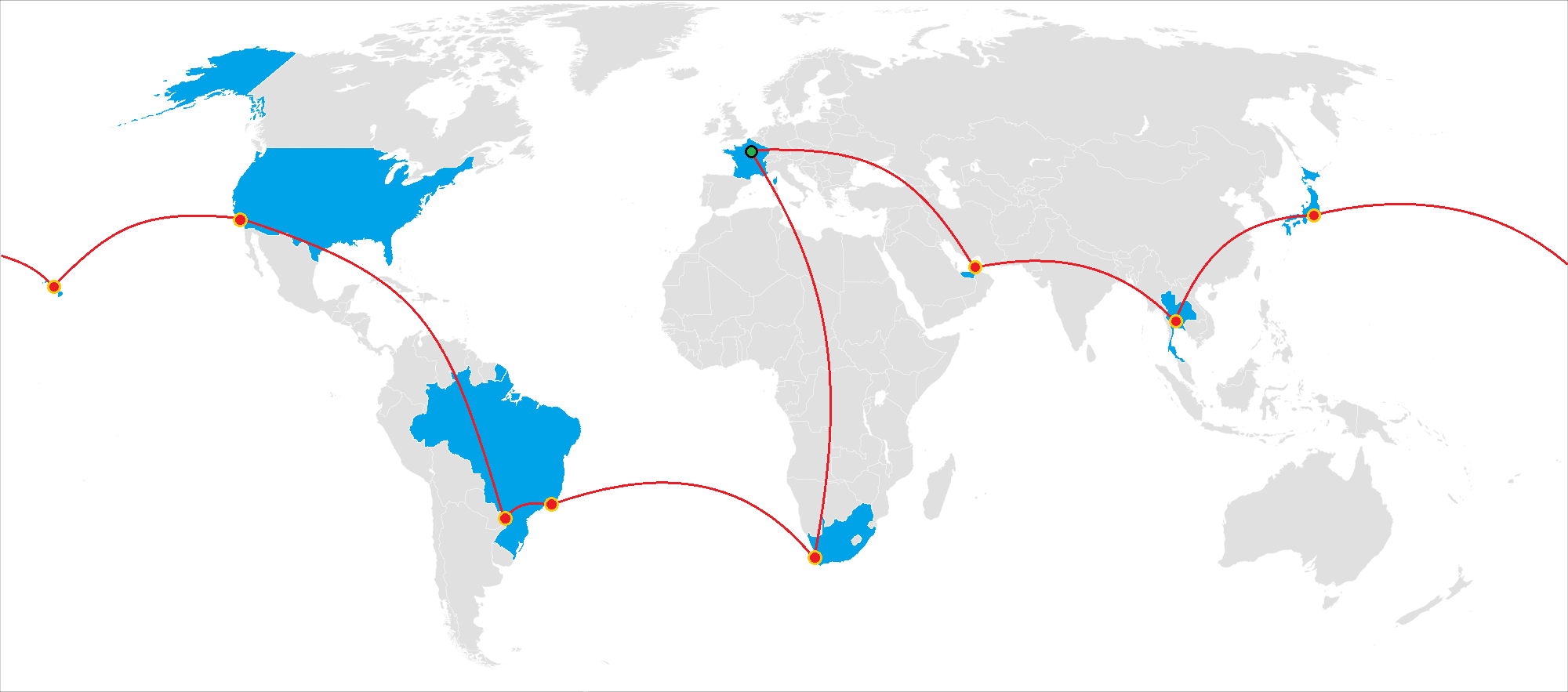
The complete route map for the first series of the French Amazing Race.

Destinations	Air travel Rail travel Water travel Bus travel Helicopter travel Bicycle travel Gondola travel
Route Markers	Cross Road (Detour) Road Block (Roadblock) Demi-tour (U-Turn) ligne d'arrivée (Pit Stop)

=== Leg 1 (France → United Arab Emirates) ===
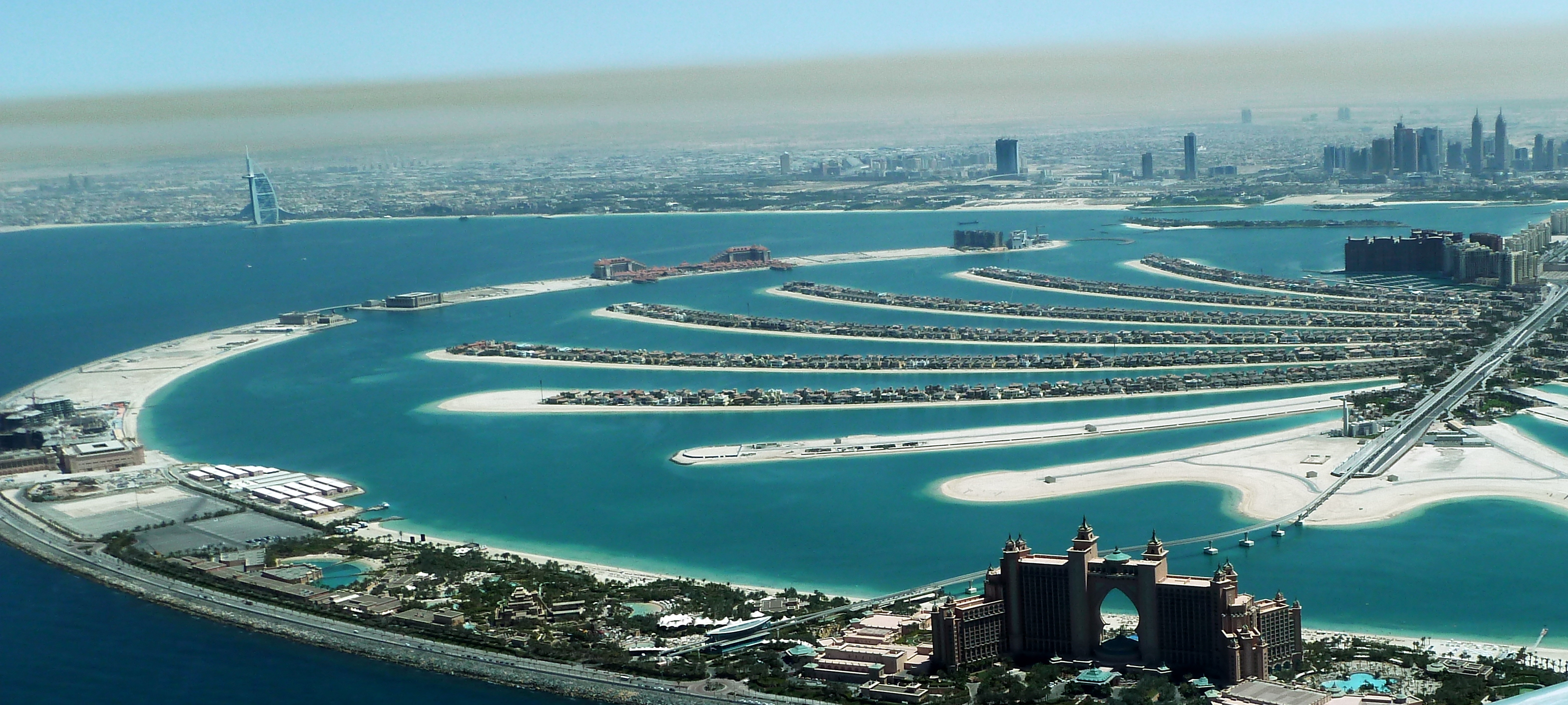
Atlantis, The Palm in Dubai hosted the season's first Pit Stop.

- Episode 1 (22 October 2012)
- Eliminated: Antoine & Héléna

Locations

- Paris, France (Parc de Saint-Cloud – Rond-point de la Balustrade) (Starting Line)
- Paris (Pont des Arts)
- Paris (1 Rue des Mauvais-Garçons – Travel Agency)
- Paris (Charles de Gaulle Airport) → Dubai, United Arab Emirates (Dubai International Airport)
- Emirate of Dubai (Rub' al Khali Desert)
- Margham (Skydive Dubai)
- Dubai (Burj Khalifa – Observation Deck)
- Dubai (Mall of the Emirates – Ski Dubai)
- Dubai (Atlantis, The Palm)

Episode summary

- Teams set off from Rond-point de la Balustrade at Parc de Saint-Cloud in Paris, where they had to get their next clue and instructed them to travel to Pont des Arts. Once there, teams had to use the key in their first clue to find the one Amazing Race colored love lock out of one hundred placed on the bridge it unlocked and give it to the couple of young lovers in exchange for their next clue.
- The clue instructed teams to travel to Travel Agency at 1 Rue des Mauvais-Garçons to book one of two flights to Dubai, United Arab Emirates. Four teams were booked on the first flight, while the remaining teams on the second flight. Once there, teams had to search the airport's parking for a taxi with the assigned driver who have their picture on it, would direct them to Rub' al Khali Desert where they would get their next clue.
- This series' first Detour was a choice between Pearls (Perles) or Camels (Chameaux). In Pearls, teams had to find and count, with the help of a sieve, the exact number of pearls in an earthenware jar filled with sand. Once the exact number of pearls was given to the pearler, accompanied by all the pearls contained in the jar, teams could receive their next clue. In Camels, teams had to choose a camel and with a help, they had to retrieve two bags of hay and deliver them to the cameleer. While one team member rode the camel, their partner had to guide the animal along the path. Both team members must hang the bags of hay on the camel by the themselves. Once the hay had been brought back, teams would receive their next clue from the cameleer.
- In this series' first Roadblock, teams had to travel to a nearby aerodrome to sign up for one of three flights. The chosen team member then had to board an aeroplane and perform a 4,000-metre (13,000 ft) tandem skydive. If they jumped within a 10-minute time limit, they received their next clue from an instructor once on the ground. Otherwise, they had to wait out a four-hour penalty.
- After the Roadblock, teams had to travel to Burj Khalifa and climb up to the highest panoramic view of the world to get their next clue, directing them to Ski Dubai where they must have to take snow with the help of buoys and shovels and carry it outside, where the temperature was approximately 50 °C (122 °F). They then had to build a 140-centimetre (4.6 ft) snowman before the snow melted to receive their next clue, directing them to the Pit Stop: Atlantis, The Palm.

Additional note

- The last three teams were not told their placings after arriving at the Pit Stop and were told together of their positions after all the teams arrived after dark.

=== Leg 2 (United Arab Emirates → Thailand) ===
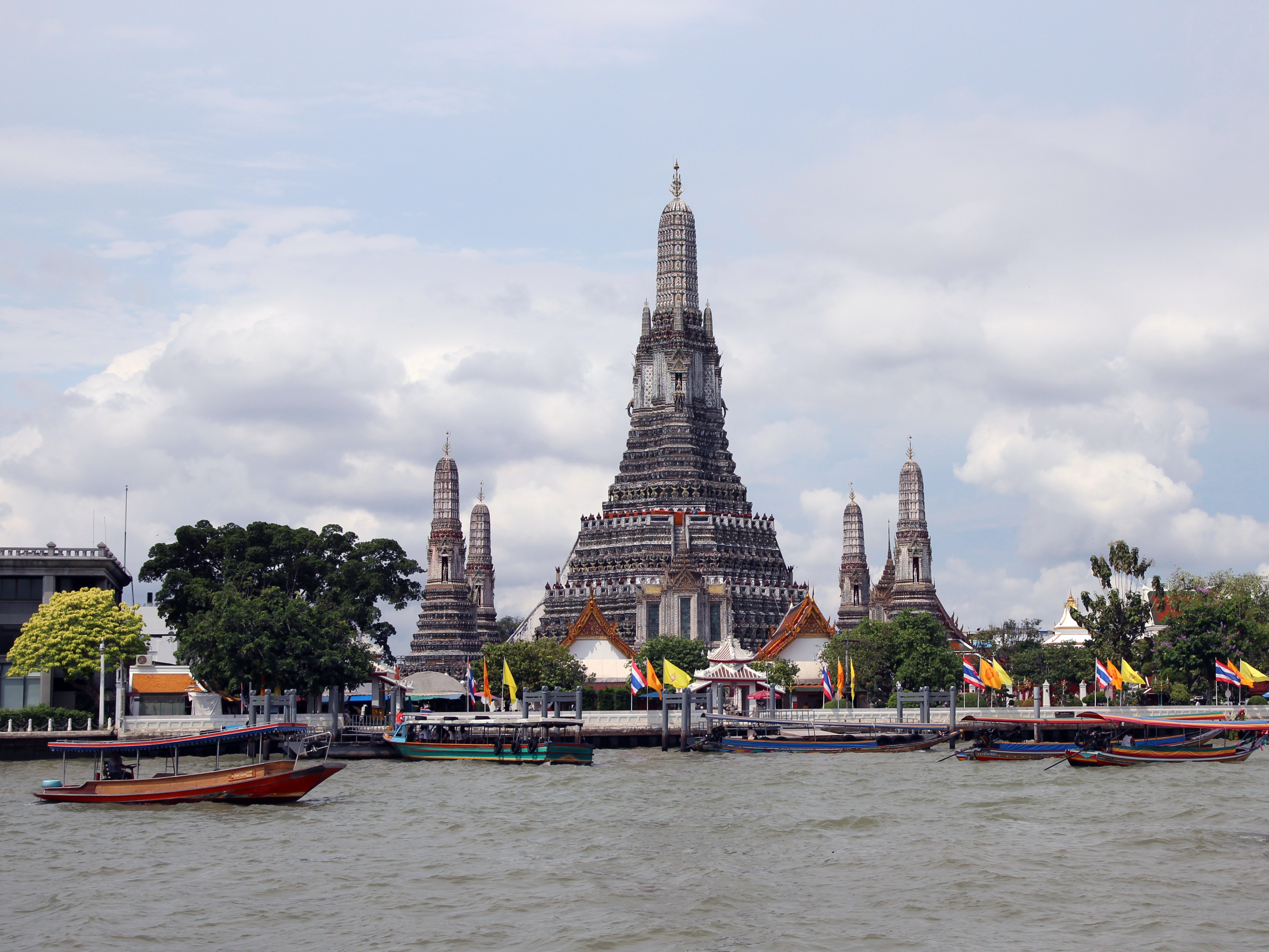
In Bangkok, teams had to take the ferry to Wat Arun where they later encountered a Roadblock.

- Episode 2 (29 October 2012)
- Eliminated: Fabien & Aurélien

Locations

- Dubai (Gloria Hotel)
- Dubai (Dubai International Airport) → Bangkok, Thailand (Suvarnabhumi Airport)
- Bangkok (Khlong Toei Market)
- Bangkok (Davis Bangkok Hotel) (Overnight Rest)
- Bangkok (Wat Pho – Phra Chedi Moo Ha)
- Bangkok (Wat Arun)
- Ayutthaya (Elephant Stay Reserve)
- Ayutthaya (Ayutthaya Historical Park – Wat Phra Mahathat)

Episode summary

- Teams received their clues from Alexandre at the previous Pit Stop and were instructed to travel to Bangkok, Thailand. Once there, they would travel to Khlong Toei Market for their next clue.
- This leg's Detour was a choice between Taste (Degustation) or Supplies (Provisions). In Taste, teams had to share and eat two bowls of traditional Thai dishes; the first one containing two scorpions, and the second one, three cockroaches. Once they've eaten all of the insects contained in their plates, teams could receive their next clue from the chef. In Supplies, teams were given a shopping list completely written in Thai and had to buy, with their own money, all of the ten ingredients on the list. Once they brought back all the food to an old lady, they could exchange them for their next clue.
- After the Detour, teams had to travel to Davis Bangkok Hotel where they had to sign up for one of two departure times for the next morning, 7:30 a.m. and 8:00 a.m. That would lead them to Wat Pho where they had to find a young student near the Phra Chedi Moo Ha. They were left to figure out that there were four Chedi, and the student was located beside one of them who would give them their next clue, directing them to Wat Arun.
- In this leg's Roadblock, one team member had to climb the stairs of Wat Arun to the top section and count the statues. Once they gave the correct number (100) to a Thai dancer on the ground, they would receive their next clue. But if they gave a wrong number, they would have to climb again and re-count all the statues before they could give a new answer to the dancer.
- After the Roadblock, teams had to travel to Elephant Stay Reserve in Ayutthaya where they had to ride an elephant into the river, and then have to wash off the traditional markings painted on it to receive their next clue, directing them to the Pit Stop: Wat Phra Mahathat.

=== Leg 3 (Thailand → Japan) ===
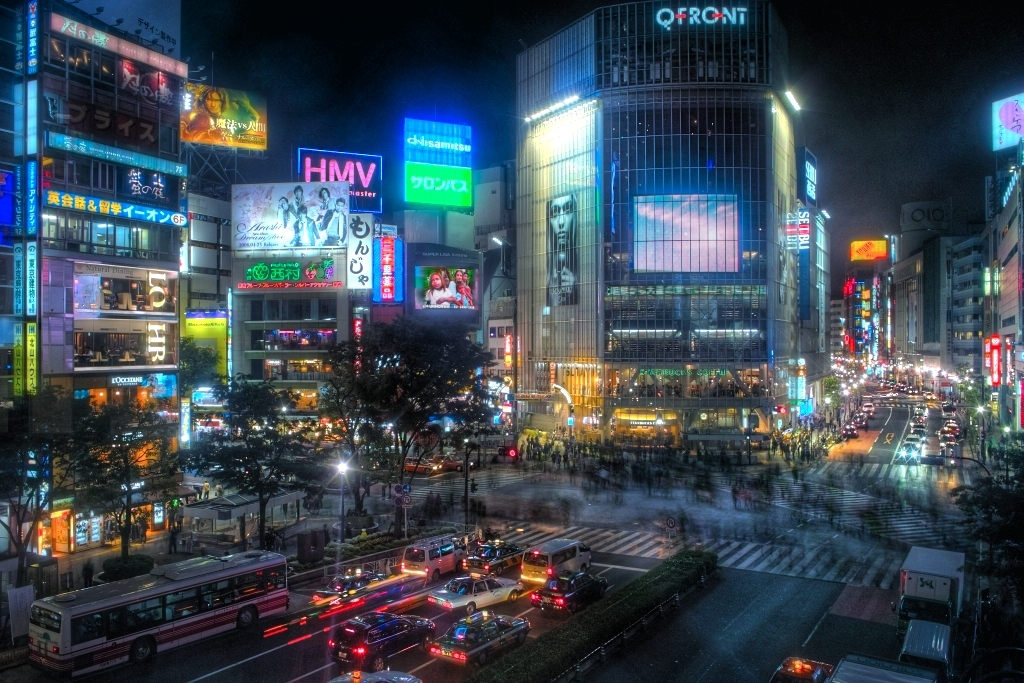
At Tokyo's Shibuya Scramble Crossing teams had to look for their next clue on the big center right screen located on the building.

- Episode 3 (5 November 2012)

Locations

- Bangkok (Suvarnabhumi Airport) → Tokyo, Japan (Narita International Airport)
- Tokyo (Shibuya Scramble Crossing)
- Tokyo (Hachikō Statue)
- Tokyo (Capsule Land Hotel) (Overnight Rest)
- Tokyo (Kaminarimon)
- Tokyo (Raichukaikan Temple)
- Tokyo (Jingu Bashi Bridge)
- Tokyo (Hikawa Jinja-Shibuya Temple)
- Tokyo (Odaiba Marine Park)

Episode summary

- Teams received their clues from Alexandre at the previous Pit Stop and were instructed to travel to Tokyo, Japan. Once there, they had to travel to the Shibuya Scramble Crossing and spot the Amazing Race logo on one of the giant screens, which then displayed a Gojūon sign (ハチ公) for ten seconds every two minutes. Teams were left to figure out that this word meant Hachikō and that they were directed to go to the Hachikō statue. A young Tokyoite located beside the statue would then exchange the word Hachikō for their next clue.
- The clues directed teams to Capsule Land Hotel, where they had to sign up for seven different departure times for the next morning, the first one at 8:00 a.m. and the last at 9:00 a.m., each one separated by ten minutes and they would receive their next clue, instructed them to Kaminarimon and then directed them to Raichukaikan Temple where they would get their next clue.
- In this leg's Roadblock, one team member had to fight on a sumo wrestling against a young rikishi until to grab their next clue hanging on his mawashi. If the team member stepped outside the red circle or fell on the ground before grabbing their clue, they would have to wait five minutes, or more if there's others teams, to restart the combat.
- After the Roadblock, teams had to head to Jingu Bashi Bridge where they must find a drawing of the character given them in the clue envelope, a person dressed as Son Goku, the main protagonist of Dragon Ball, and give him a pink coloured gift to receive their next clue, directing them to Hikawa Jinja-Shibuya Temple and their next clue.
- This leg's Detour was a choice between Noodles (Nouilles) or Fishes (Poissons). In Noodles, teams had to deliver six bowls of noodles to a group of customers 150 meters away from a restaurant, while wearing a kimono and a pair of geta and without spilling soup below a bowl's red pattern, to receive their next clue. In Fishes, teams had to play a game called goldfish scooping and catch 15 goldfish with rice paper scoopers to receive their next clue.
- After the Detour, teams had to head to the Pit Stop: Odaiba Marine Park.

Additional notes

- Oucéni & Lassana chose to use the U-Turn on Anthony & Sonja.
- This was a non-elimination leg.

=== Leg 4 (Japan → United States) ===
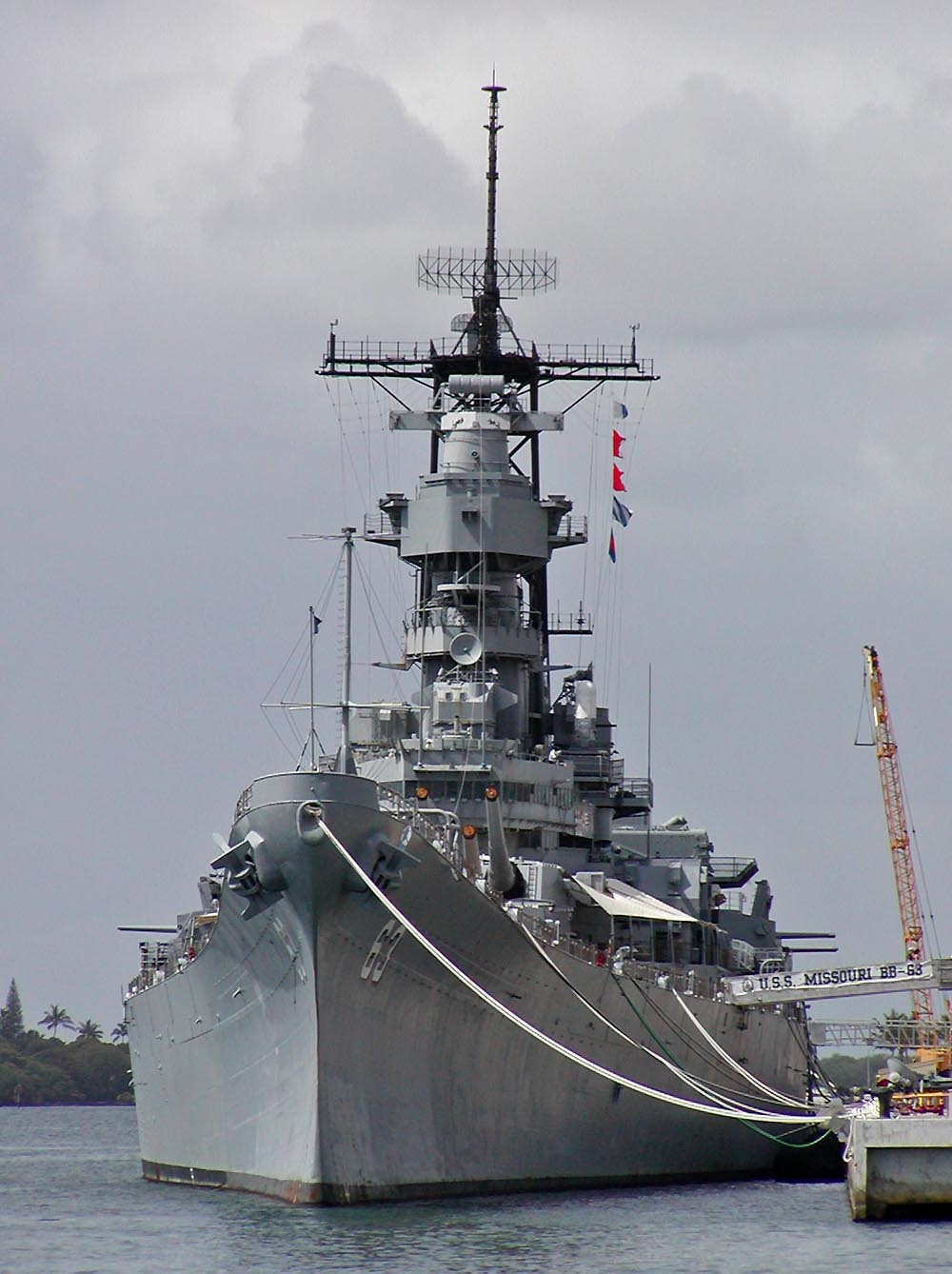
For the Roadblock in Hawaii, one team member had to board the USS Missouri and decipher flag semaphore.

- Episode 4 (12 November 2012)
- Eliminated: Mathilde & Séverine

Locations

- Tokyo (Narita International Airport) → Honolulu, United States (Honolulu International Airport)
- Pearl Harbor (USS Missouri)
- North Shore (Kawela Bay) (Overnight Rest)
- Honolulu (Magic Island)
- Kualoa Valley (Secret Island)

Episode summary

- Teams received their clues from Alexandre at the previous Pit Stop and were instructed to travel to Honolulu, United States. Once there, they had to travel by taxi to USS Missouri and find their next clue.
- In this leg's Roadblock, one team member had to decipher their next destination: Kawela Bay, which would be presented to them through the use of flag semaphore, to receive their next clue. Racers were given a list of flag positions representing each letter, but they would have to memorize it before a naval officer would present them with their destination.
- After the Roadblock, teams had to choose a marked vehicle and must drive themselves to Kawela Bay, where they had to sign up for departure times the following morning. The first four teams would depart at 8:45 a.m., and the last three would depart at 9:00 a.m. During the rest, teams got to enjoy a private beach and a lūʻau upon received their next clue, directing them to Magic Island, where they would get their next clue.
- This leg's Detour was a choice between Crushed Ice (Glace Pilée) or Broken Stone (Pierre Cassée). In Crushed Ice, teams had to fill a bucket with shave ice using a traditional saw to shave a block of ice to receive their next clue. In Broken Stone, teams had to take a surfboard out to a buoy in the water using the traditional Hawaiian standard of standing upright on top of it, retrieve a two-kilogram (4.4 lb) stone from beneath the buoy, and return it to shore. They would then have to use a chisel to break the stone and retrieve their clue from inside.
- After the Detour, teams had to drive them to the Pit Stop: Secret Island.

=== Leg 5 (United States) ===
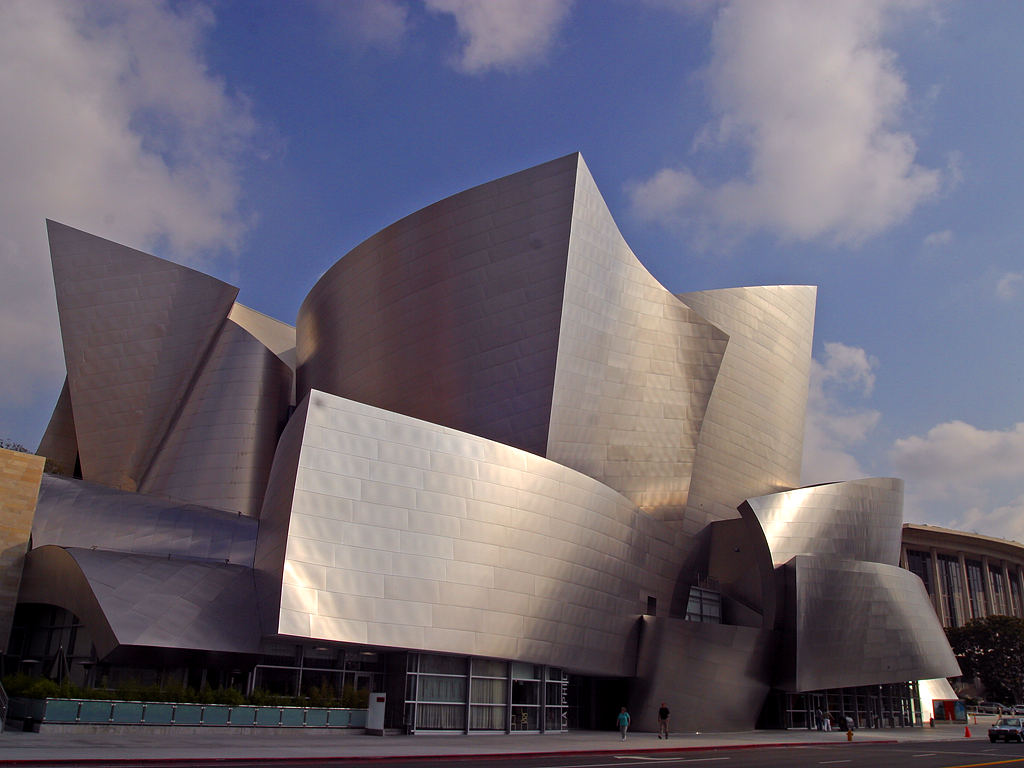
In Los Angeles, teams had to find a saxophonist outside the Walt Disney Concert Hall playing one of the songs on a CD given to them, "The Bare Necessities".

- Episode 5 (19 November 2012)
- Eliminated: Oucéni & Lassana

Locations

- Honolulu (Honolulu International Airport) → Los Angeles (Los Angeles International Airport)
- Los Angeles (Venice Beach)
- Los Angeles (Omni Los Angeles Hotel at California Plaza) (Overnight Rest)
- Los Angeles (Walt Disney Concert Hall)
- Los Angeles (Hollywood Boulevard – Hollywood Walk of Fame)
- Santa Clarita (Golden Oak Ranch)
- Los Angeles (Venice Beach)

Episode summary

- Teams received their clues from Alexandre at the previous Pit Stop and were instructed to travel to Los Angeles. Once there, they had to drive themselves to Venice Beach for their next clue.
- This leg's Detour was a choice between Ice Pick (Pic à Glace) or Picasso. In Ice Pick, teams had to take control of an ice cream cart and must sell ice cream cones for at least US$2 until a cone made up to US$30. In Picasso, teams had to convince locals to let them paint caricatures of them and sell them to make US$30. Once completed either task, they had enough earnings before receiving their next clue.
- After the Detour, teams would receive a CD containing nine French versions of Disney songs ("Bibbidi-Bobbidi-Boo", "Everybody Wants to Be a Cat", "Colors of the Wind", "Bella Notte", "The Bare Necessities", "Hakuna Matata", "Following the Leader", "Supercalifragilisticexpialidocious", "I Wan'na Be Like You") and had to memorise the names of these songs while listening to the CD on the way to Omni Los Angeles Hotel at California Plaza to spend the night. This would lead them to travel to Walt Disney Concert Hall, where they had to locate a saxophonist, who would be playing one of the nine songs from the CD ("The Bare Necessities"), and correctly identify the song to receive their next clue.
- The clue directed teams to travel to Hollywood Boulevard, where they had to locate four stars on the Hollywood Walk of Fame using a photograph of four peoples' heads edited onto Mount Rushmore: Sylvester Stallone, Michael Jackson, Steven Spielberg, and Meryl Streep. Once they had located all four and taken a picture of each, they would give them to a woman dressed as Marilyn Monroe in exchange for their next clue.
- In this leg's Roadblock, one team member had to successfully perform a burnout in a car on a movie set to receive their next clue, directed them to drive to the Pit Stop: Venice Beach.

=== Leg 6 (United States → Brazil) ===
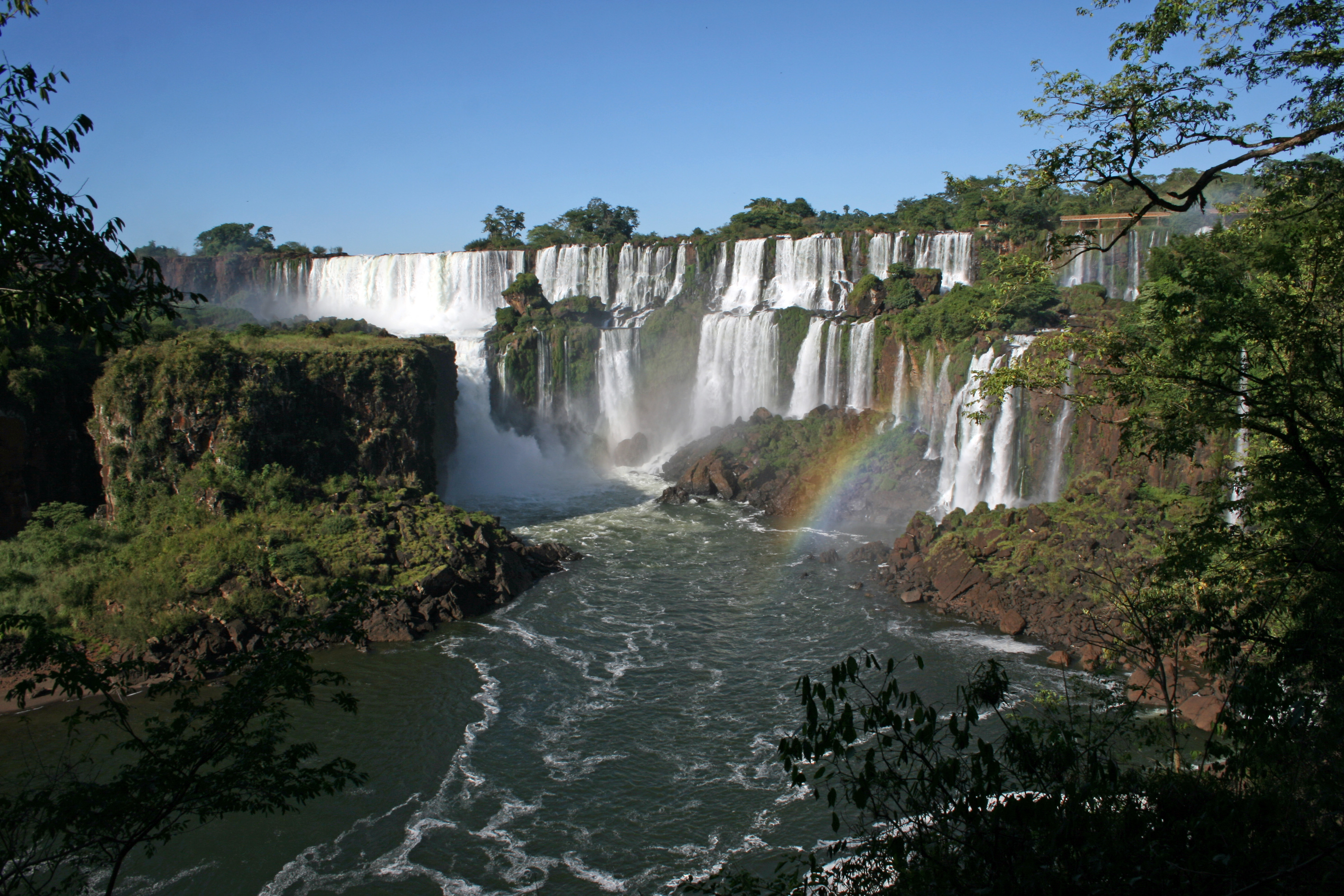
The sixth leg had teams visit Iguaçu Falls in Iguaçu National Park.

- Episode 6 (26 November 2012)

Locations

- Los Angeles (Los Angeles International Airport) → Foz do Iguacu, Brazil (Foz do Iguaçu International Airport)
- Iguaçu National Park (Jungle Camp) (Overnight Rest)
- Iguaçu National Park (Mirante Garganta do Diabo)
- Iguaçu National Park (Bike Parking Lot)
- Iguaçu National Park (Iguaçu River)
- Iguaçu National Park (Cânion Iguaçu (in Portuguese))
- Iguaçu National Park (Puerto Macuco)

Episode summary

- Teams received their clues from Alexandre at the previous Pit Stop and were instructed to travel to Foz do Iguaçu, Brazil. Once there, they would have to drive themselves to Jungle Camp at Iguaçu National Park where they had to sign up for one departure times the following morning. During their stay, teams received video messages from their loved ones at home, directing them to lead to Mirante Garganta do Diabo for their next clue.
- This leg's Detour was a choice between Knowledge (Connaissance) or Patience. In Knowledge, teams had to choose from a variety of items representing Brazil, Argentina and Paraguay, and correctly give five of each to the correct representatives of each country to receive their next clue. However, a bank note from Panama and a map from Chile were included to trick teams. In Patience, teams had to untangle a large knot of ropes to release their next clue from inside.
- After the Detour, teams had to repair and inflate the tires of bikes, which they would use to ride to their next destination, which was over the Iguaçu River, where they had to ride kayaks five kilometres (3.1 mi) down the river to get their next clue.
- In this leg's Roadblock, one team member had to rappel 55 metres (180 ft) down Cânion Iguaçu to receive their next clue.
- After the Roadblock, teams had to raft four kilometres (2.5 mi) down the river to the Pit Stop: Puerto Macuco.

Additional notes

- Throughout this leg, teams followed coloured flags to guide them around the national park. Orange flags led to the camp, red led to the Detour clue, pink led to the knowledge Detour, green led to the patience Detour and the bike parking lot, light blue led to the end of the bike course, and yellow led to the Roadblock clue.
- There was no rest period at the end of this leg, and all teams were instead instructed to continue racing.

=== Leg 7 (Brazil) ===
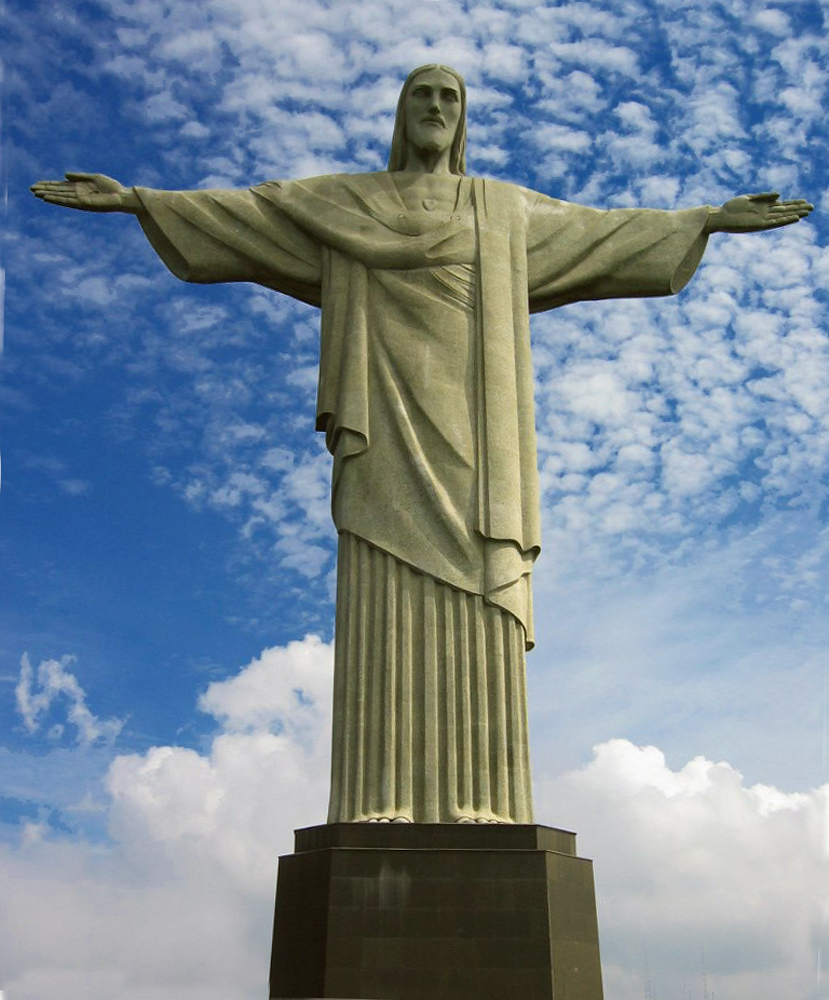
In Rio de Janeiro, teams visited the famous Christ the Redeemer statue to find a clue.

- Episode 7 (3 December 2012)
- Eliminated: Francis & Benjamin

Locations

- Foz do Iguaçu (Foz do Iguaçu International Airport) → Rio de Janeiro (Rio de Janeiro/Galeão International Airport)
- Rio de Janeiro (Cantagalo Slums)
- Rio de Janeiro (Christ the Redeemer)
- Rio de Janeiro (Copacabana Beach outside Rio Othon Palace)
- Rio de Janeiro (Largo da Carioca (in Portuguese))
- Rio de Janeiro (Botafogo Beach)

Episode summary

- At the start of the leg, teams were instructed to travel to Rio de Janeiro. Once there, they had to travel to Cantagalo Slums, where they had to follow Amazing Race flags and arrows to find a young boy named João with their next clue.
- In this leg's Roadblock, one team member had to kick a soccer ball through a small metal grate representing their goal, but could not let the ball knock away the piece of wood at the bottom of the opening, meaning teams needed to kick the ball through the air. They would have to accomplish this task twice in five attempts, or they would have to go to the back of the line.
- After the Roadblock, teams had to travel to Christ the Redeemer where they had to search for their next clue.
- This leg's Detour was a choice between Leg Game (Jeu de Jambes) or Beach Game (Jeu de Plage). In Leg Game, teams had to learn and perform a samba dance to the satisfaction of a judge to receive their next clue. In Beach Game, teams had to add the word "Race" to a pre-existing sand sculpture of Corcovado with "Amazing" written on it. They would then have to cover a small Christ the Redeemer statue with wet sand to complete the sculpture and receive their next clue.
- After the Detour, teams had to travel to Largo da Carioca, where they had to conduct a survey with the people of Rio de Janeiro. They had to find eight people from eight different states of Brazil and bring them to the judge, who would verify their place of birth and stamp the survey until they would receive their next clue, directing them to the Pit Stop: Botafogo Beach.

=== Leg 8 (Brazil → South Africa) ===
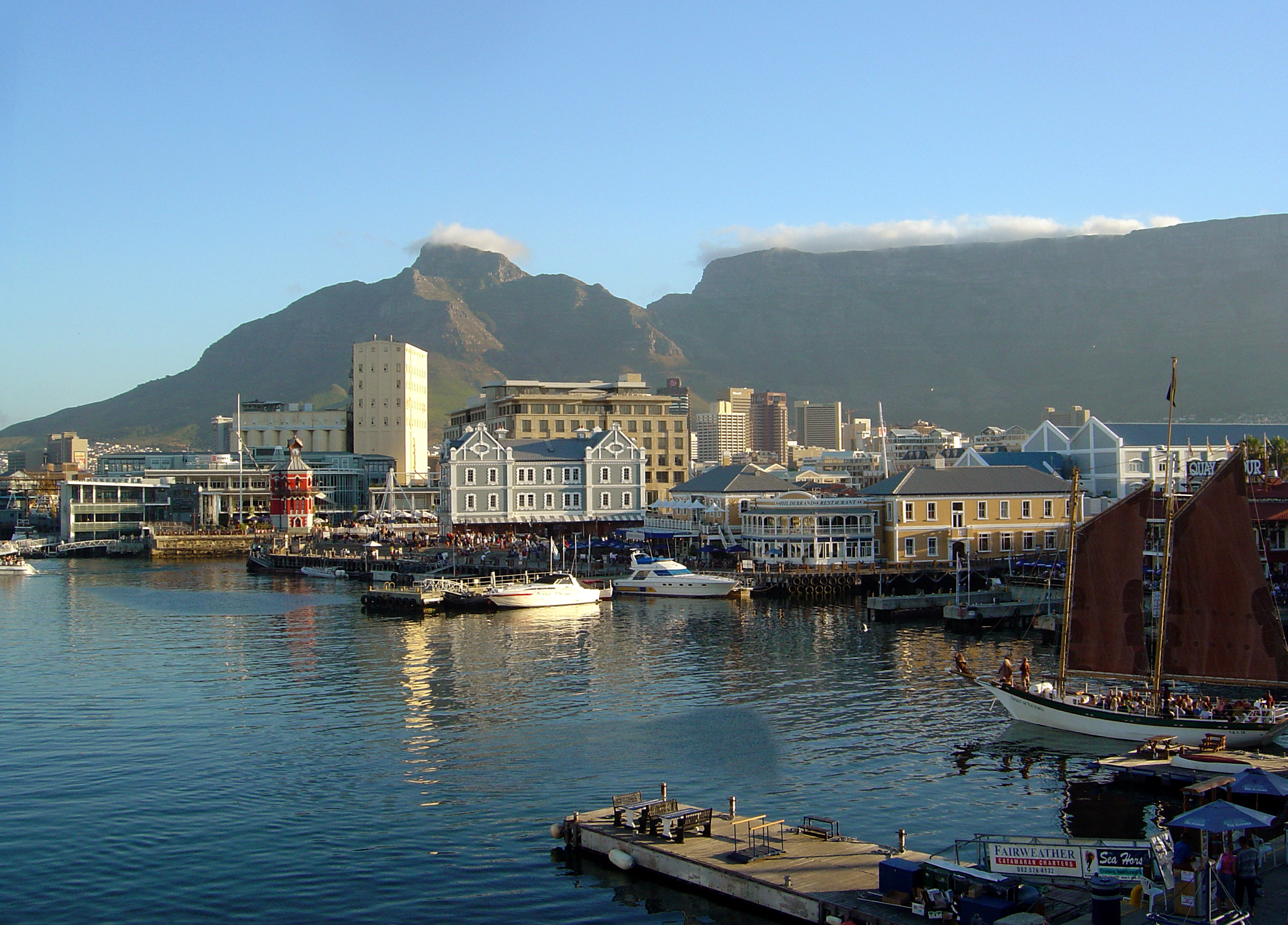
In this leg, teams traveled to Victoria & Alfred Waterfront in Cape Town to perform one of the selected Detours.

- Episode 8 (10 December 2012)

Locations

- Rio de Janeiro (Rio de Janeiro/Galeão International Airport) → Cape Town, South Africa (Cape Town International Airport)
- Cape Town (Victoria & Alfred Waterfront)
- Cape Town (Protea Hotel Fire & Ice!) (Overnight Rest)
- Cape Town (District Six Museum)
- Cape Town (Castle of Good Hope)
- Cape Town (Khayelitsha – Intyatyambo Orphanage)
- Cape Town (Cape of Good Hope – Cape Point)
- Cape Town (Rhodes Memorial)

Episode summary

- Teams received their clues from Alexandre at the previous Pit Stop and were instructed to travel to Cape Town, South Africa. Once there, they would have to travel to Victoria & Alfred Waterfront where they grab their next clue.
- This leg's Detour was a choice between Radio or Disco. In Radio, teams had to travel to the Waterfront's market, where they had to put together two radios with the material provided to receive their clue. In Disco, teams had to learn and perform a Gumboot dance with a troupe of African dancers to receive their clue.
- After the Detour, teams had to travel to District Six Museum for their next clue. However, the museum was closed and had to spend the night at Protea Hotel Fire & Ice!. Once the museum opened the next day, teams had to complete a wood block puzzle, which would reveal two street names. Teams had to use the large map of District Six on the ground to find the written name of someone who used to live at the intersection of these two before being removed during Apartheid. They would then have to find this person inside the museum to receive their next clue.
- After completing the task, teams had to receive a copy of the Cape Times and had to find their next clue printed inside, indicating where they would find their cars and their next clue envelope, directing them to drive to Intyatyambo Orphanage, where they had to participate in Mandela Day activities and helped out at the orphanage by delivering gifts provided in their vehicles, doing chores and repairing the site for 67 minutes (in reference to the Mandela Day slogan) before receiving their next clue.
- The clues directed teams to travel to Cape of Good Hope, where they must take a funicular ride to Cape Point to search for their next clue, directing them to the Pit Stop: Rhodes Memorial.

Additional note

- This was a non-elimination leg.

=== Leg 9 (South Africa) ===
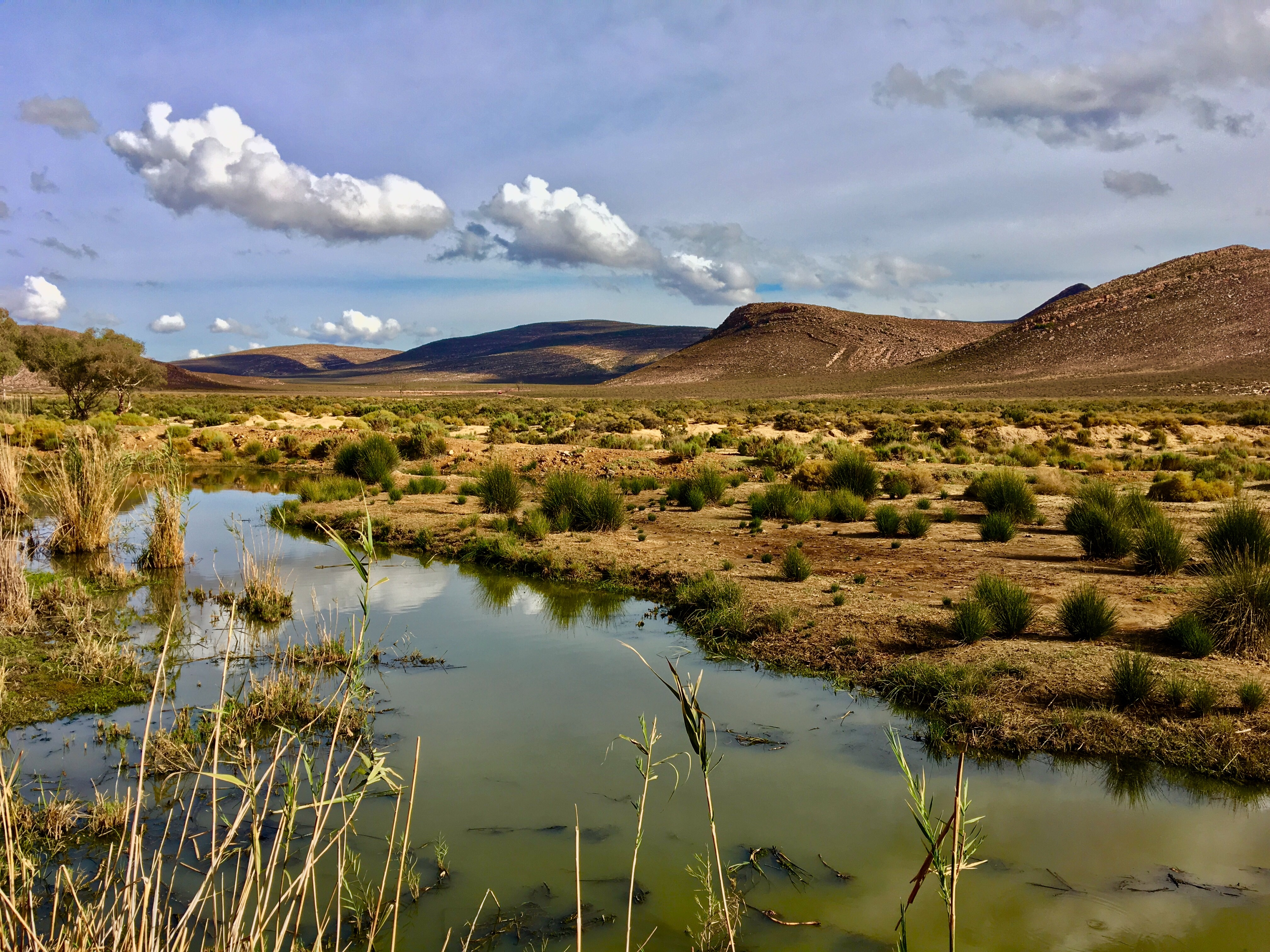
Much of the second leg in South Africa was set in the Aquila Private Game Reserve.

- Episode 9 (17 December 2012)
- Eliminated: Heïdi & Michel

Locations

- Cape Town (Protea Hotel Fire & Ice!)
- Touws River (Aquila Private Game Reserve)
- Touws River (Aquila Private Game Reserve – Stone Cottage)
- Touws River (Aquila Private Game Reserve – Boma Area)
- Paarl (Nelson Wine Estate)
- Franschhoek (Huguenot Monument)

Episode summary

- Teams received their clues from Alexandre at the previous Pit Stop and were instructed to drive themselves to Aquila Private Game Reserve for their next clue.
- At the Game Reserve, teams must have to participate in a safari and had to use binoculars to look for numbers scattered throughout the safari, which would be used to answer the eight questions about wildlife after arriving at Stone Cottage. These questions were: The maximum speed of lion (50 km/h), days hippo can go without drinking (5 days), Elephant gestation period (22 months), amount of vertebrae in a giraffe's spines (7), average weight of cheetah (60 kg), amount of time the lion can sleep per day (20 hours), amount of time a hippo can stay underwater (6 minutes) and white rhino's life expectancy (45). Once they answered all questions correctly, teams could proceed to the Detour.
- This leg's Detour was a choice between Dry Game (Jeu de la Terre) or Wet Game (Jeu de l'eau). In Dry Game, teams were faced with a series of pots suspended from an arch. The pot in the middle was painted black, and had to be avoided. Teams had to use a traditional tribal club from a distance to hit the pots. If the black pot was hit, teams incurred a ten-minute penalty. In Wet Game, teams had to open an ostrich egg and empty its contents. They then had to use the egg shells to transport water and fill a jar to receive their next clue.
- After the Detour, teams had to drive themselves to Nelson Wine Estate in Paarl to get their next clue.
- In this leg's Roadblock, one team member had to roll a 120-kilogram (260 lb) leaking wine barrel 200 metres (660 ft) to the wine vats and refill it before receiving their next clue, directing them to drive to the Pit Stop: Huguenot Monument.

Additional note

- Hadj & Yacim chose to use the U-Turn on Heïdi & Michel.

=== Leg 10 (South Africa → France) ===
Teams concluded Amazing Race at the Stade de France.

- Episode 10 (24 December 2012)
- Prize: €50,000
- Winners: Anthony & Sonja
- Runners-up: Hadj & Yacim
- Third place: Stéphanie & Alice

Locations

- Cape Town (Protea Hotel Fire & Ice!)
- Cape Town (Port of Cape Town)
- Cape Town (Cape Town International Airport) → Paris, France (Charles de Gaulle Airport)
- Ermenonville (La Mer de Sable)
- Chantilly (Château de Chantilly)
- Fontaine-Chaalis (Chaalis Abbey)
- Saint-Denis (Stade de France)

Episode summary

- Teams received their clues from Alexandre at the previous Pit Stop for the final Roadblock of the series, where they had to take a boat out to the ocean, one team member had to descend down in a shark cage. They then had to take a photograph of a shark, fitting its entire body into the image, before they could grab their clue from the shark cage and return to the boat. If they took a good photograph of the shark that would receive a 15-minute headstart at the airport.
- After the Roadblock, teams were instructed to fly to Paris. Once there, they had to travel to La Mer de Sable, where they had to dig in the sand to find their next clue. However, some holes contained clues saying essayer à nouveau ("Try again"). Those found the correct clue teams travelled to Château de Chantilly, where they would get their next clue.
- This season's final Detour was a choice between Whipped Cream (Crème Fouettée) or Target Sight (Cible Visée). In Whipped Cream, teams had to use the provided ingredients to make a batch of Crème Chantilly to a chef's satisfaction to receive their next clue. In Target Sight, teams had to shoot arrows at a target using a bow and needed to get two in the outer blue part, two in the middle red part, and two in the centre yellow part to receive their next clue.
- After the Detour, teams had to travel to Chaalis Abbey, where they must place markers containing distances in kilometres next to each destination they visited on the season, indicating how far away the location is from Paris, which they had to arrange in chronological order in order to receive their next clue.

Leg	City	Distance
1	Dubai	5245
2	Bangkok	9443
3	Tokyo	9712
4	Honolulu	11969
5	Los Angeles	9085
6	Iguaçu	9982
7	Rio de Janeiro	9168
8	Cape Town	9341
9	Aquila	9192

- The clues instructed teams to travel to Stade de France, where they had to find the commemorative star for Zinedine Zidane, they would find a clue box containing tickets that would grant them inside the stadium's entrance for the Finish Line.

Additional notes

- Teams opened their clue for this leg's Roadblock after arriving at the previous leg's Pit Stop. They had to decide who would perform it before checking in there.
- Like the first leg, teams were not told of their placing after arriving at the Pit Stop. Instead, they were all told together after all teams had checked in.

== Ratings ==
The following information was taken from Médiamétrie.

Episode	Airdate	Viewers	Market Share (Ages 4+)	Rank
1	22 October 2012	868,000	3.5%	#8
2	29 October 2012	634,000	2.5%	#9
3	5 November 2012	618,000	2.4%	#10
4	12 November 2012	596,000	2.3%	#11
5	19 November 2012	587,000	2.3%	#9
6	26 November 2012	559,000	2.1%	#11
7	3 December 2012	445,000	1.7%	#12
8	10 December 2012	445,000	1.7%	#12
9	17 December 2012	418,000	1.6%	#10
10	24 December 2012	220,000	1.5%	#11
