= Elephantstay =

Thai non-profit enterprise

Visitors riding elephants at the historic Royal Elephant Kraal

Elephantstay is a non profit enterprise under the Prakochabaan Foundation in Ayutthaya, Thailand. The mission of the enterprise is educate people about the importance of elephants in Thai history and culture as well as caring for elephants.

== Location ==
Elephantstay is based at the Royal Elephant Kraal & Village, a working elephant village in Ayutthaya, 80 kilometres north of Bangkok.

== History ==
The Prakochabaan Foundation and the Ayutthaya Elephant Palace and Royal Elephant Kraal Village were founded by Laithongrien Meepan in April 2005. Laithongrien Meepan (Pi Om) is a Zoologist. Founder and Director of the Prakochabaan Foundation, he is an expert on elephant breeding, training, history and culture. He received the Tan Khun Paen Din (Outstanding Social Contributors Award) in 2010.

His wife Romthongsai Meepan (Pi Lek) has committed her life to elephants and their welfare. Romthongsai managed the Ayutthaya Elephant Palace for many years, and specializes in educating Thai people about elephants. She liaisons with local government and businesses promoting elephants and the issues they face. The Prakochabaan Foundation aims to protect and conserve elephants, encourage the culture of elephants and the development of mahouts and elephants, and to raise their status to the noble position they once held in Thai society. The foundation is also a World Elephant Day associate.

The Royal Elephant Kraal & Village was established in 1996, and is home to 90 elephants (Oct 2014). Today a world heritage site, the Royal Elephant Kraal is steeped in elephant history. It dates back to the 16th century and was historically a compound where wild elephants were captured and kept.

For hundreds of years the Kings of Thailand would attend the Royal Elephant Round Up and choose the best and strongest elephants that would work and live alongside the Thai people, and be used for labor or the military. The last annual roundup from the wild was in 1906, a spectacular display and testament to the King's power and skills of the mahouts. Note: The term "kraal" means "an enclosure into which are driven wild elephants which are to be tamed and educated," according to the 1913 Websters dictionary.

== Elephantstay experience ==
Elephantstay was established by Michelle Reedy and Ewa Narkiewicz in 2006. The pair travelled Thailand and visited several elephant camps before settling at the Royal Elephant Kraal. They were impressed with the work and vision of Laithongrein Meepan and wanted to make a difference to the Thai elephants. Michelle Reedy was in management before pursuing animal studies and working as a zookeeper for 9 years. Ewa Narkiewicz was a photographic based artist, with a degree in Fine Arts. She also has a Bachelor of Arts, degree majoring in History.

Elephantstay has been established in response to the increasing aging population of working elephants. The Elephantstay project looks after old retired elephants, giving them specialized care required for older elephants. Guests from all over the world work alongside the mahouts and get involved in the care of the elephants and life at the Elephant Kraal & Village.

Each guest is allocated their own elephant and will care for the elephant during their stay doing everything from cleaning, feeding, riding and bathing their elephant. This gives people an opportunity to work with the elephants, learn about elephants and Thai Elephant culture. The Elephantstay experience will ensure both retirement and an income to support these older elephants. The elephants will continue to have interaction with humans and other elephants; but they will lead the life that is desired by an old elephant: bathing in the river, having dust baths, grazing and socialising with other elephants.

== Conservation ==
The Royal Elephant Kraal has a nursery and is committed to the conservation of the species. They run an active breeding program via natural breeding. It is the most successful in the world with 70 successful births since 2000 (until May 1, 2018).

== Elephant identification ==
The Royal Elephant Kraal is proud to be issued the new national Elephant Identification papers. Due to their founder, Laithongrien (Pi Om) Meepan's vision and efforts, the government adopted his idea for a centralized system that ensures all legal elephants are issued with these comprehensive IDs that act as a passport and will be used to monitor ownership and all travel. An important aspect of the passports will be to also register bull elephant's ivory.

In recognition of Pi Om's invaluable knowledge and contribution to the new system, the government used the same elephant as Royal Kraal and Elephantstay logo for the cover design of the passports. The colour of the passports is pink which is the official color of the King of Thailand. This new computerized centralized system will impact the illegal trade, capture and use of wild elephants and the illegal ivory trade. New born elephants will need to be registered within 30 days of birth which will also help to protect all elephants.

== Rehabilitation ==
The Kraal also acts as an elephant rehabilitation center for dangerous elephants. They are being trained and cared for. Ewa Narkiewicz says about Laithongrein Meepan: "Yes, he has an incredible ability to understand elephants...we've seen him retrain killer bulls that have been condemned to be shot by the government."

Cases

- On August 21, 2007, Boon Seuhm came to the Kraal just days after she killed a man who taunted her and withheld food 10 years ago. The Kraal saved her from being executed and she now leads a happy life going through the rehab process.
- Also an Elephant named Khun Song was rescued after he was attacked by another bull elephant.
- Recently Natalie was rescued after large amount of donations from the public.
