= Alexandre Delpérier =

French sports journalist, radio and television presenter

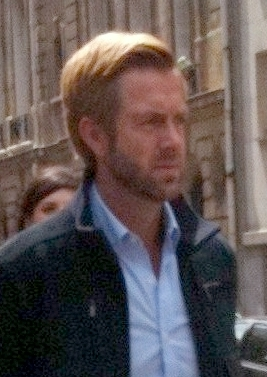
- Alexandre Delpérier (2012)
- Born: 17 November 1967 (age 58); Bergerac, Dordogne, France
- Occupations: Sports journalist, radio presenter, television presenter
- Years active: 1989–present
- Television: Amazing Race (D8)

Alexandre Delpérier (born 17 November 1967) is a French sports journalist, radio and television presenter.

== Television career ==
Alexandre Delpérier began his career on Antenne 2 with in internship at the sports service with the help of Sophie Davant, but has stated that he learned the profession without studying in a journalism school. He made his television debut on the same channel presenting programs for children and later small humour sequences titled Tout tout rire.

He then left the public television to join TF1 where he presented Des Copains en or, a version with children of Une famille en or (French version of Family Feud) every Wednesday during summer 1996. The same year, he replaced Alexandre Debanne after his motorcycle accident to co-host Vidéo Gag with Bernard Montiel. From October 1997 to May 1998, he presented the daily game show Touché, gagné replacing Olivier Chabodio after being accused of cheating in the game show Intervilles (French version of It's a Knockout).

In November 2000, he joined M6. He presented the program Mission : 1 million but it was suspended two weeks later due to poor audience. In January 2001, he presents Qui décide ?, a weekly program of seven minutes about daily life. From September 2002 to December 2007, he co-hosts one of the morning programs on M6, Star Six Music with Nathalie Vincent (2002–03) and Karine Ferri (2006–07).

In August 2008, he left M6 to become a presenter specialized in automotive sport on channel Direct 8, commenting the races of the World Rally Championship and the Superleague Formula with Paul Belmondo. He then commentated on football matches broadcast on Direct 8, which include 2009 Copa Libertadores (with Omar da Fonseca), 2009 Trophée des Champions (with Eric Roy), France national under-21 football team and France national under-19 football team (with Vincent Guérin), France women's national football team and UEFA Women's Champions League.

In 2010, he signed an exclusive contract with Direct 8 and became the presenter specialized in sports, commenting boxing and rugby matches. Since April 2010, he presents Autosport, a short program of six minutes dedicated to automotive sports news broadcast every Saturday evening. In April and May 2011, he became the presenter of Objectif Champion every Saturday evening with Cécile de Ménibus.

From October to December 2012, he hosts the adventure game show Amazing Race on D8 (which replaced Direct 8). He also replaces Grégory Galiffi to present Direct Auto during his absence on the same channel.

== Radio career ==
From 1991 to 1998, he worked for NRJ Group to present news programs on NRJ and Chérie FM. In 2001, he joined RMC, under construction by Alain Weill, former director of the NRJ Group. He presents sport programs on weekends. He also comments the Formula One Grand Prix with former pilot Patrick Tambay. In September 2007, he presents Intégrale Foot and After Foot from Monday to Friday and the second part of the evening on RMC.

In July 2008, he joined Europe 1 to present from Monday to Thursday Europe 1 Foot and Club Sports Europe 1. He also commented the 2009 Formula One season featuring the analysis of Alain Prost. In March 2010, Arnaud Hermant from Le Parisien revealed the broadcast on Europe 1 of an interview that Alexandre Delpérier would have presented as an exclusive one of Raymond Domenech and Thierry Henry, but it was only a press conference. This article will become the consequence that he was suspended by the direction. He then resigned a few days later and left the radio station.

== Printing press ==
Alexandre Delpérier also made sports interviews for TV Magazine and chronics before every Formula One Grand Prix.

== Personal life ==
Alexandre Delpérier married in December 2001. With his wife Johanna, he has two children, Louis (born in December 2003) and Valentin (born in August 2006). In 2005, the couple lost a child, a girl Capucine, just before the end of the pregnancy. He also has a daughter Pauline (born in 1994) from a previous relationship.
