= Alexandre Debanne =

French television presenter (born 1960)

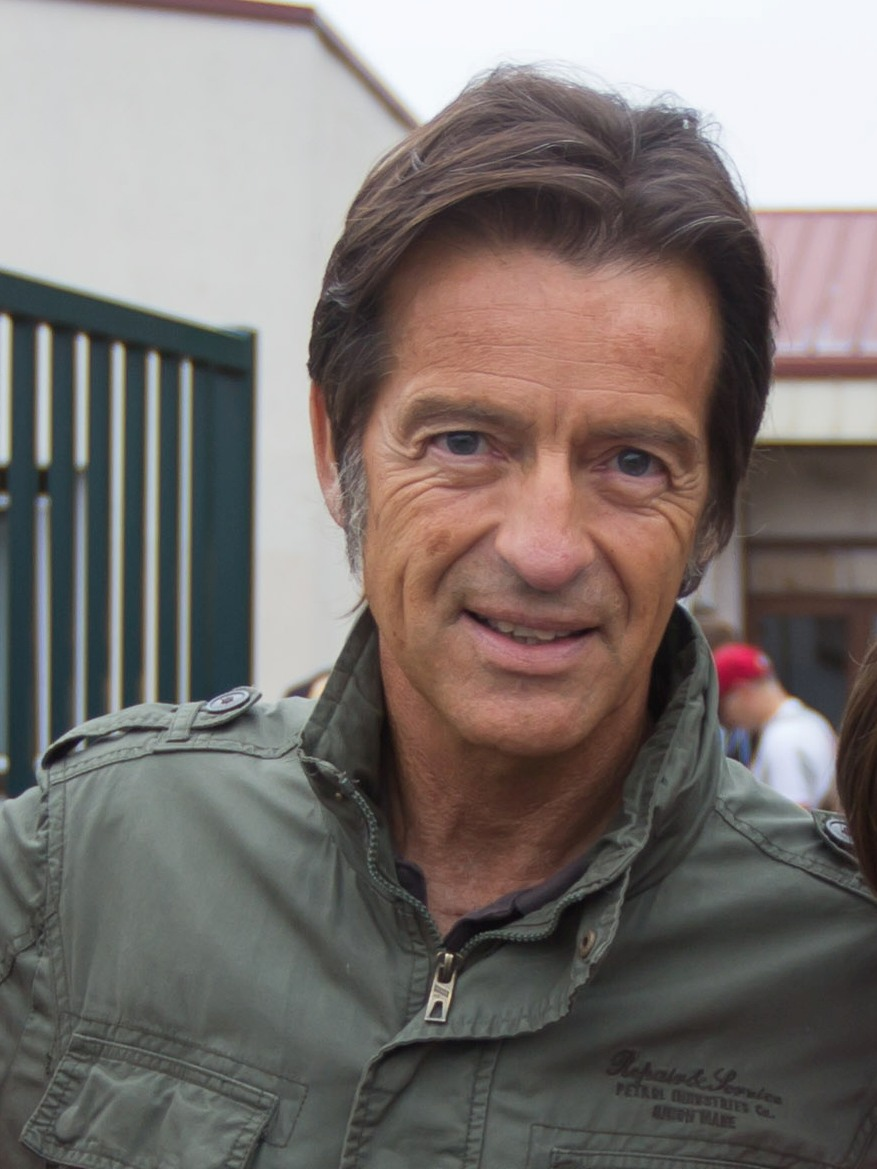
- Debanne in 2016
- Born: 8 April 1960 (age 65); Melun, Seine-et-Marne, France
- Occupations: Radio presenter, television presenter
- Years active: 1980–present
- Television: Vidéo Gag (TF1); La Roue de la fortune (TF1)

Alexandre Debanne (born 8 April 1960) is a French television presenter.

== Radio career ==
Alexandre Debanne began his career at age 20 on FR3 Radio Centre (Bourges) and then with local radio stations. He became one of the famous radio presenters of CFM, one of the first local stations of Bourges that ended only after one year of existence. He then came back to Bourges to create another local station named Diabolo FM (later Vibration). He later became one of the most famous radio presenters of NRJ in the 1980s.

From February 2007 to January 2008, he presented the program Debout les chéries on Chérie FM in direct every morning from Monday to Friday.

== Television career ==
In 1987, he presented the television program Des clips dans mon 4 heures on TF1. He then joined M6, but went back TF1 soon after to become a main presenter of the channel, co-hosting Vidéo Gag with Bernard Montiel and La Roue de la fortune for a while. In June 1996, he was victim of a motorcycle accident. Alexandre Delpérier replaced him at Vidéo Gag at that time. He reappeared on television on 30 December 1996 at the evening news presented by Patrick Poivre d'Arvor. In 1997, he decided to spend more time for his passions (travelling, sport) and left TF1.

After an experience in theatre, he attempted a return on television on France 3 with the game show host Le Kadox from 1998 to 2000. He then presented adventure programs, where he explored different areas for tourism. He travelled to Burma, Papua New Guinea, Québec and New Caledonia in the program Appel d'air.

== Television programs ==
- Des clips dans mon 4 heures (1987)
- Presenter of the concert La Plus Grande Discothèque du monde in 1990
- Multitop (1989–90)
- Vidéo Gag (1990–96)
- La Roue de la fortune (1993–94)
- Le Kadox (1998–2000)
- Terre de sports (2006)
- Des brides et vous (2004–present)
- Altitude (2007)
- Les 20 stars qui ont frôlé la mort (2008)
- Moto Magazine
- Tous en course (2009)
- Le Refuge (2010)

== Books ==
- Bloody Sunday, Éditions Michel Lafon, 1997 (ISBN 9782840982555)
