= Protea Hotels by Marriott =

South African hotel chain

- Type: subsidiary
- Industry: Hospitality, Hotels, Tourism
- Founded: 1984
- Founder: Otto Stehlik
- Number of locations: 80 in 10 African Countries (June 30, 2020)
- Area served: Africa
- Products: hotel and resort properties
- Parent: Marriott International
- Website: protea.marriott.com

Protea Hotels by Marriott is a South African hotel and leisure company headquartered in Cape Town, South Africa. As of December 31, 2018, it was the largest hotel company on the African continent, with 80 properties in ten countries with 50 rooms in addition to 14 hotels with 2,498 rooms in the pipeline. The company was named for the flowering plant protea, which is unique to South Africa, and its logo features a representation of the flower.

== History ==
Otto Stehlik and six business associates established the company in 1984. At that time, the founders held 40% of the stock, the remaining 60% being held by Bankrop, now part of Barclays Africa Group. Initially, the company had four properties under management; two in Cape Town, one in Johannesburg and one in KwaZulu Natal South Coast. Expanding to 20 within a year, over 100 existed after two decades.

In November 2013, Protea Hospitality Holdings, the holding company of Protea Hotels, signed a letter of intent, to be acquired by Marriott International, the parent company of Marriott Hotels. The acquisition was approved by regulatory agencies in the respective nations, and on January 22, 2014, it was announced that Protea had been sold for $186 million. All hotels controlled by PHH have since been rebranded as Protea Hotels by Marriott, but retaining the historic protea-flower logo.

== Locations ==
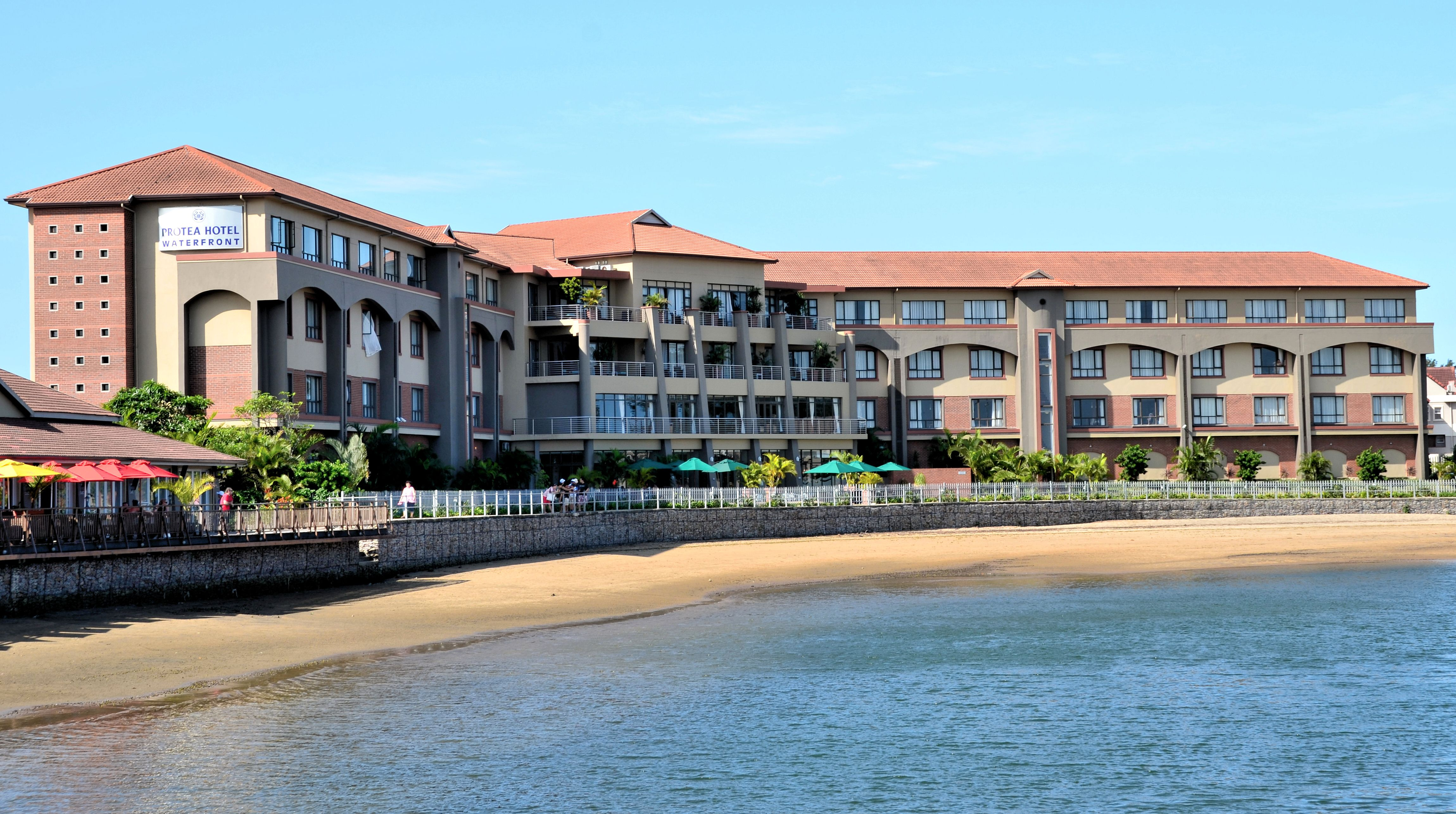
Protea Hotel Richards Bay

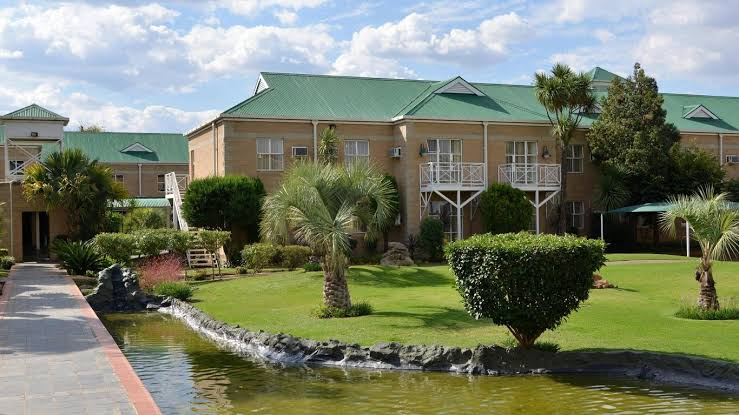
Protea Hotel Klerksdorp

The company owns, manages or franchises three, four and five star properties in nine African countries. The majority of its properties are located in South Africa, where the company was founded and where it maintains its headquarters. Other countries of operation are Algeria, Ghana, Malawi, Namibia, Nigeria, Tanzania, Uganda and Zambia and recently Botswana.

== Accommodations ==
=== Historical ===
			Total
2014	Properties	112	112
2014	Rooms	10,107	10,107

=== From 2015 ===
		North America	Europe	Middle E. & Africa	Asia & Pacific	Caribbean Latin Am.	Total
2015	Properties			102			102
2015	Rooms			9,609			9,609
2016	Properties			97			97
2016	Rooms			9,352			9,352
2017	Properties			90			90
2017	Rooms			9,033			9,033
2018	Properties			80			80
2018	Rooms			8,265			8,265
2019	Properties			80			80
2019	Rooms			8,359			8,359
2020	Properties			74			74
2020	Rooms			7,851			7,851
2021	Properties		1	66			67
2021	Rooms		72	6,783			6,855
2022	Properties		1	64			65
2022	Rooms		72	6,627			6,699
2023	Properties		1	62			63
2023	Rooms		72	6,539			6,611

== See also ==
- Marriott Hotels
