= Rio Othon Palace =

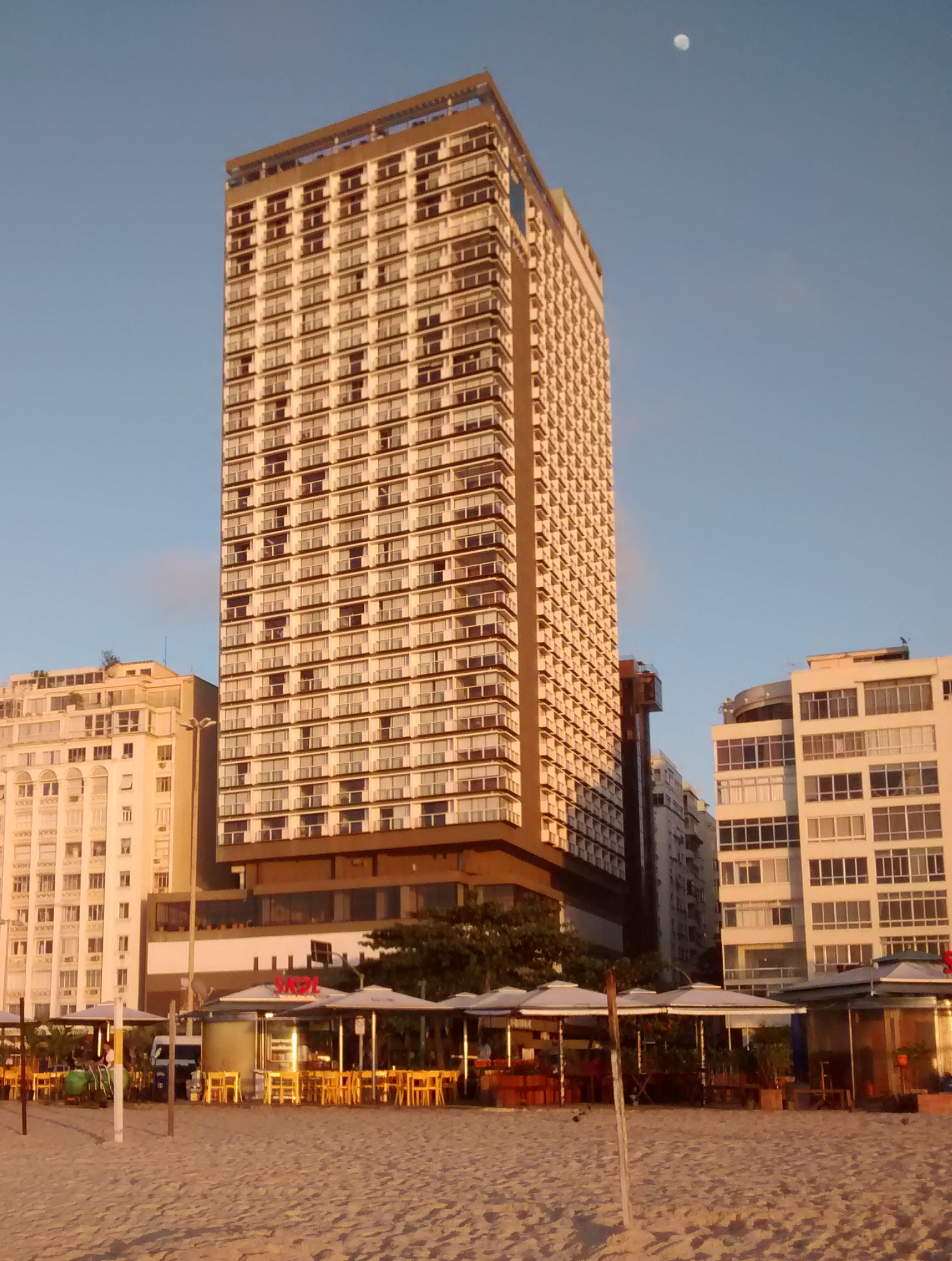

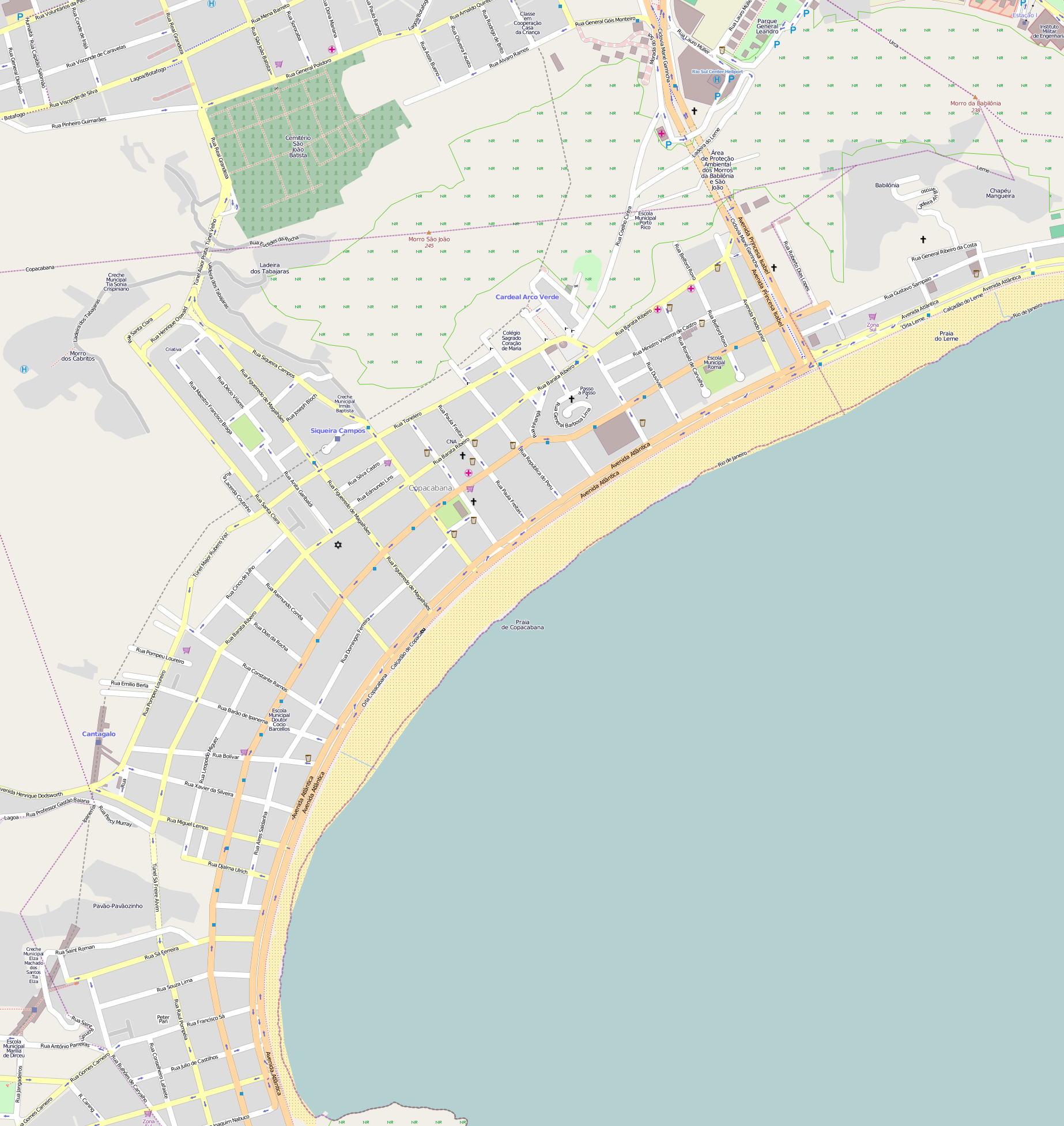
- Location within Copacabana, Rio de Janeiro

General information
- Location: Copacabana, Rio de Janeiro, Brazil
- Coordinates: 22°58′38″S 43°11′20″W
- Opening: 1977

Other information
- Number of rooms: 572

Rio Othon Palace is a highrise hotel located on Copacabana Beach in Rio de Janeiro, Brazil.

The 98-metre, 30-storey hotel opened in 1977 and has 585 guest rooms.

== Gallery ==
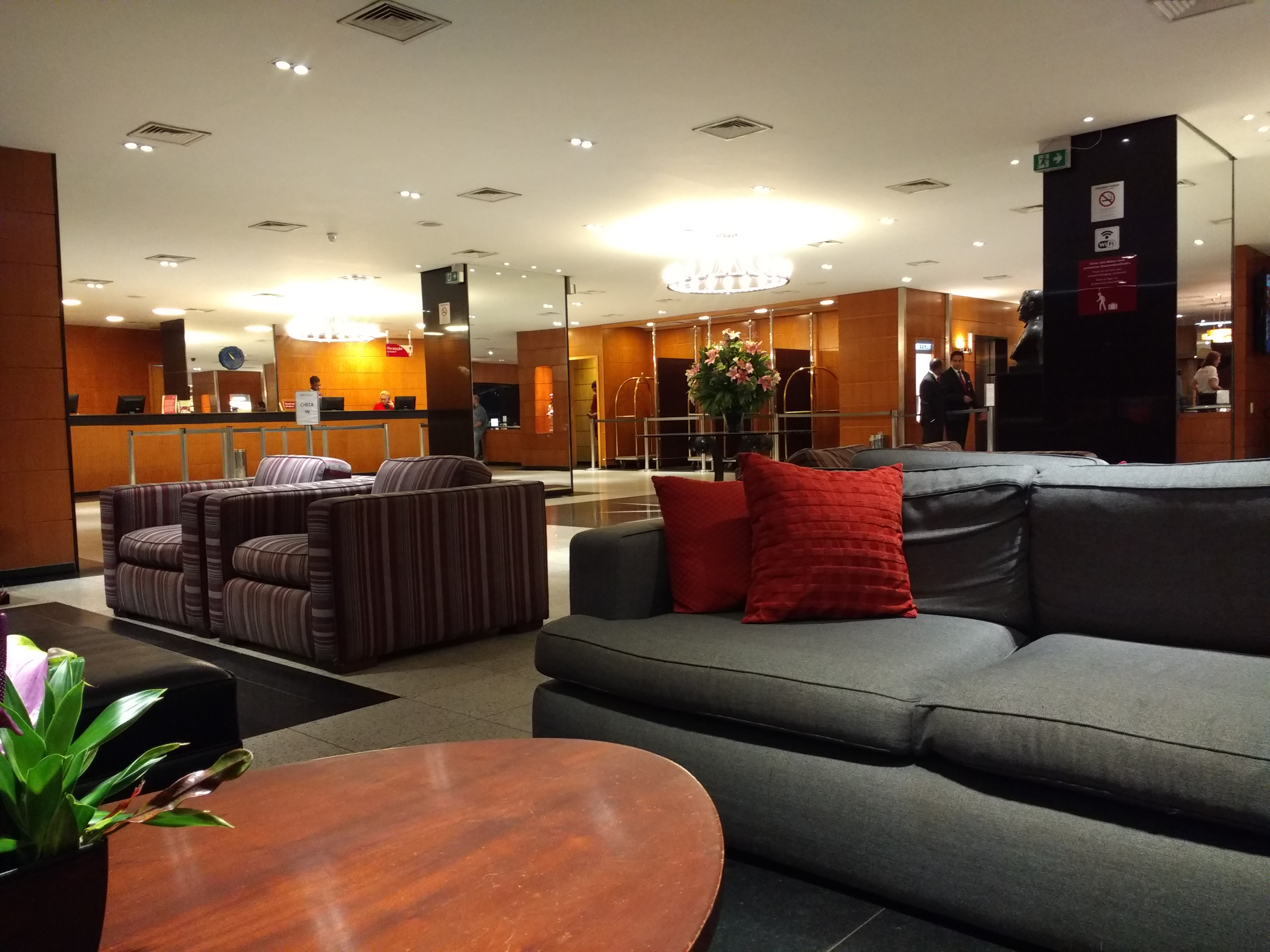
Lobby

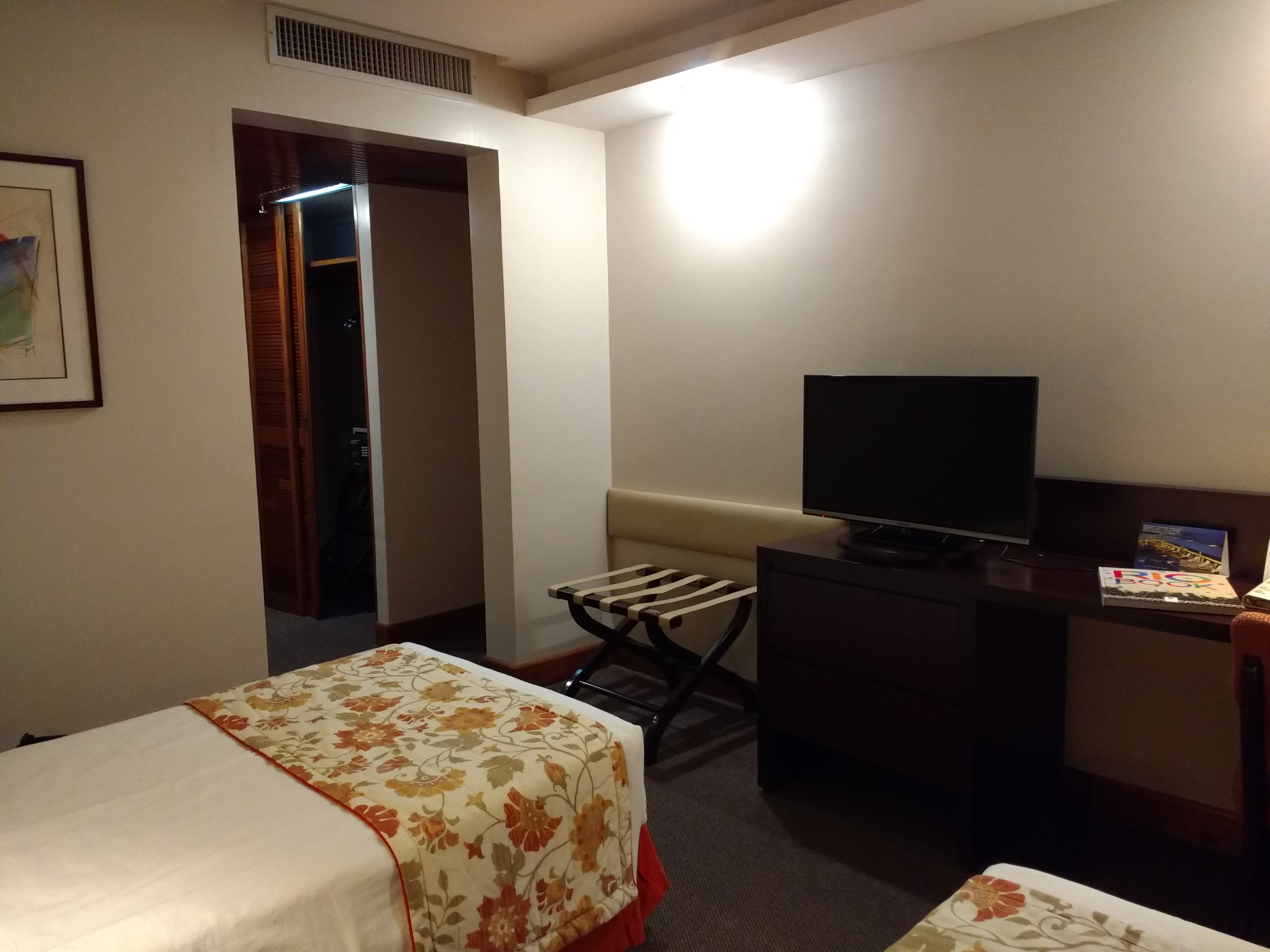
A twin bedroom

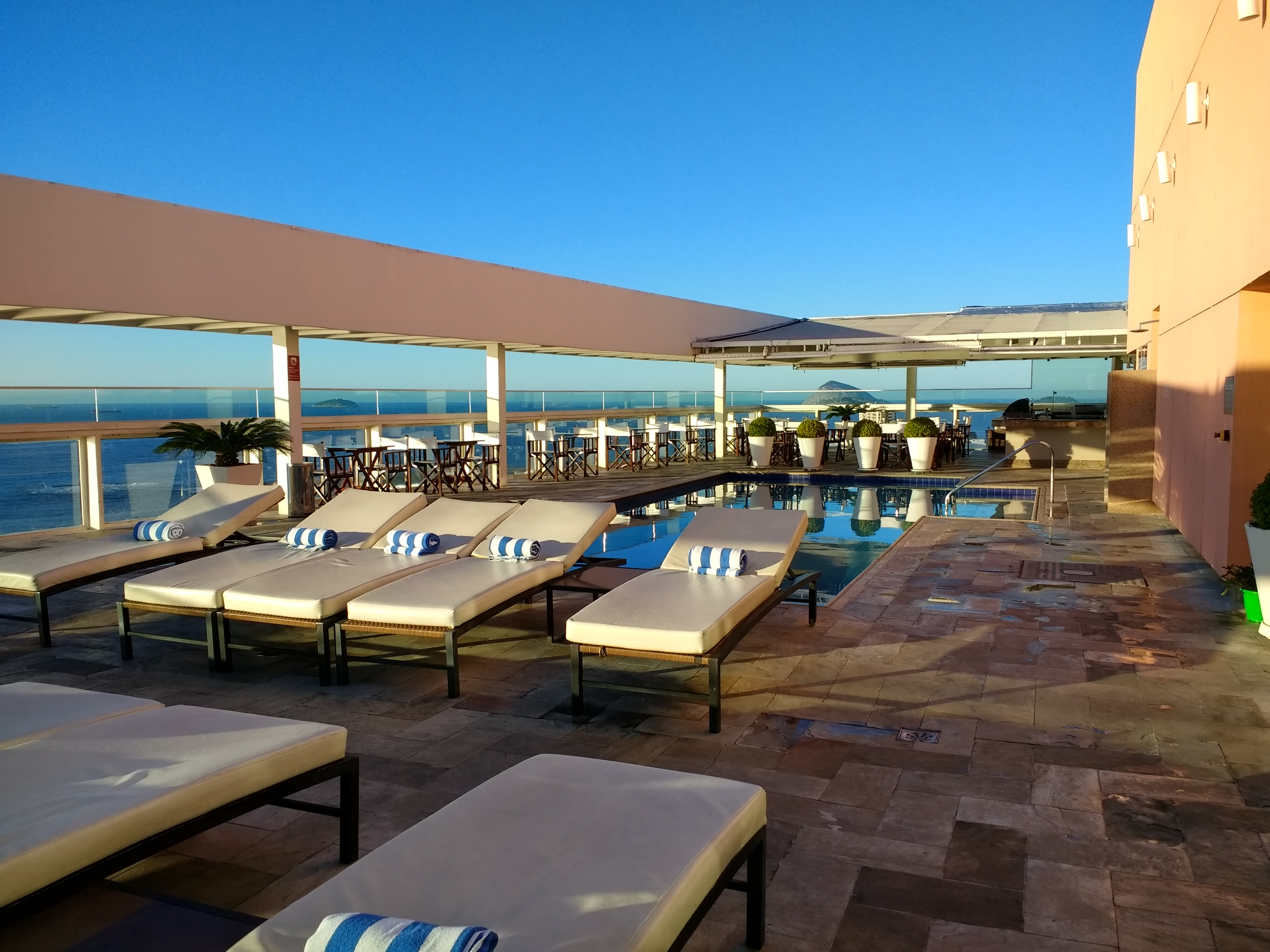
Rooftop pool

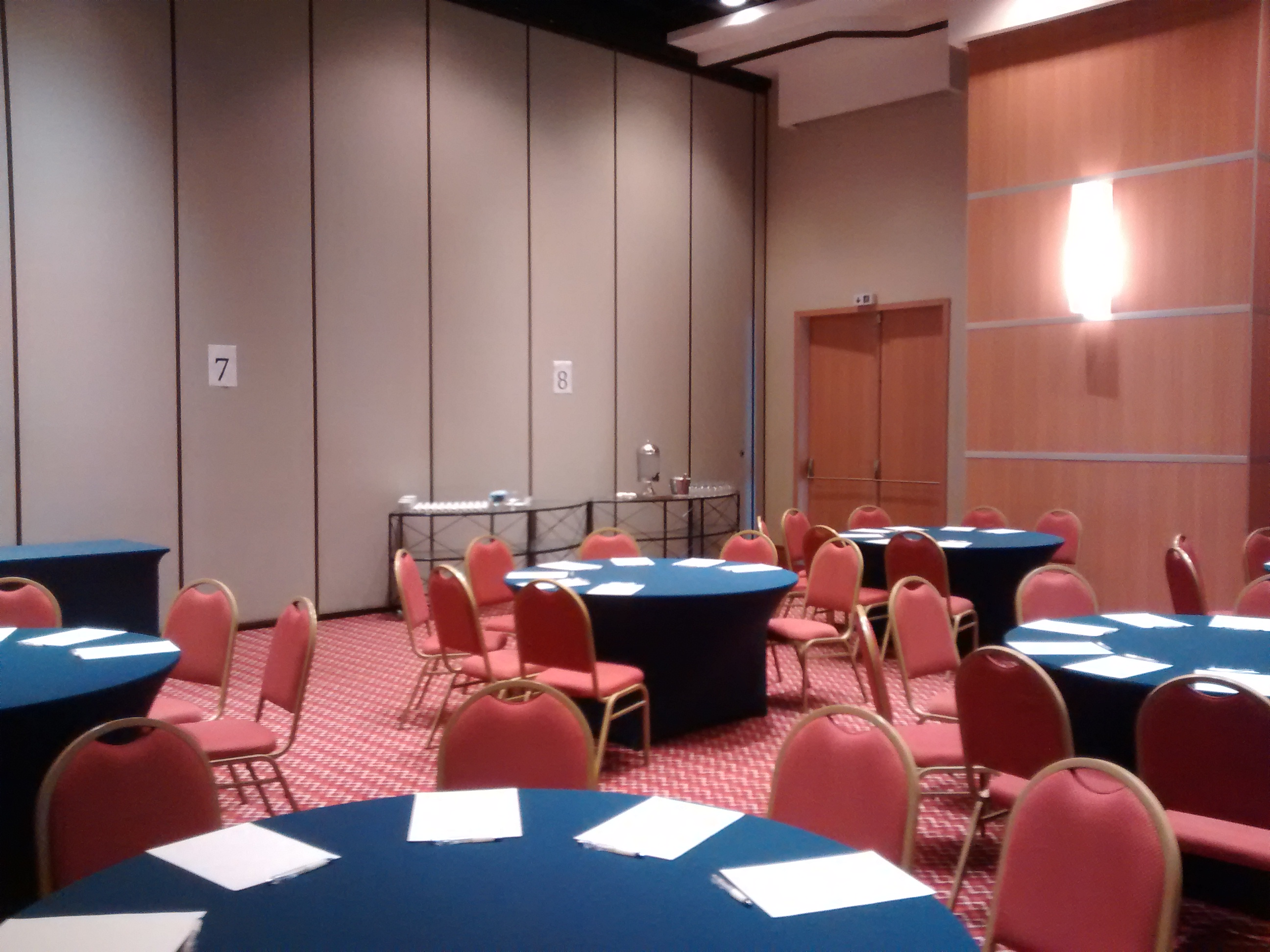
A conference room
