= Cantagalo–Pavão–Pavãozinho =

- Neighborhood
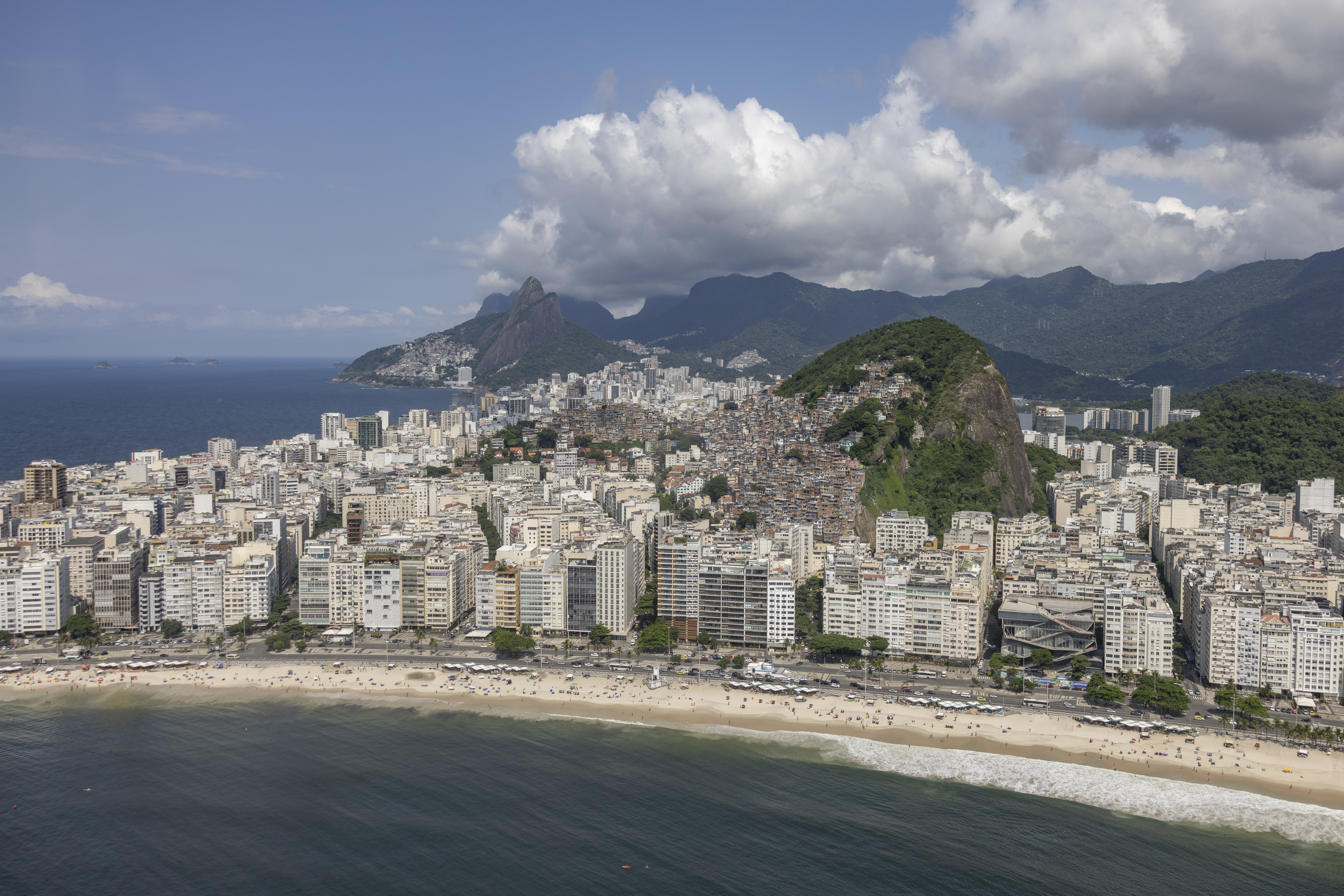
- Cantagalo Hill in 2022

- Location in Rio de Janeiro Cantagalo–Pavão–Pavãozinho (Brazil)
- Coordinates: 22°58′48″S 43°11′42″W
- Country: Brazil
- State: Rio de Janeiro (RJ)
- Municipality/City: Rio de Janeiro
- Zone: South Zone

Cantagalo–Pavão–Pavãozinho is a neighborhood consisting of two favelas in the South Zone of Rio de Janeiro, Brazil. It is located between Ipanema and Copacabana. In 2010, it had about 9,500 inhabitants.

Cantagalo and Pavão–Pavãozinho formerly had high rates of violent crime, often associated with the drug trade. However, beginning in December 2009, the neighborhood was pacified by a then-newly formed Pacifying Police Unit (UPP). On 30 June 2010, the Rubem Braga Complex was inaugurated in it, composed of two towers, an overlook called "Mirante da Paz" ("Peace Overlook"), and two lifts linking the favela to the General Osório Metro Station.

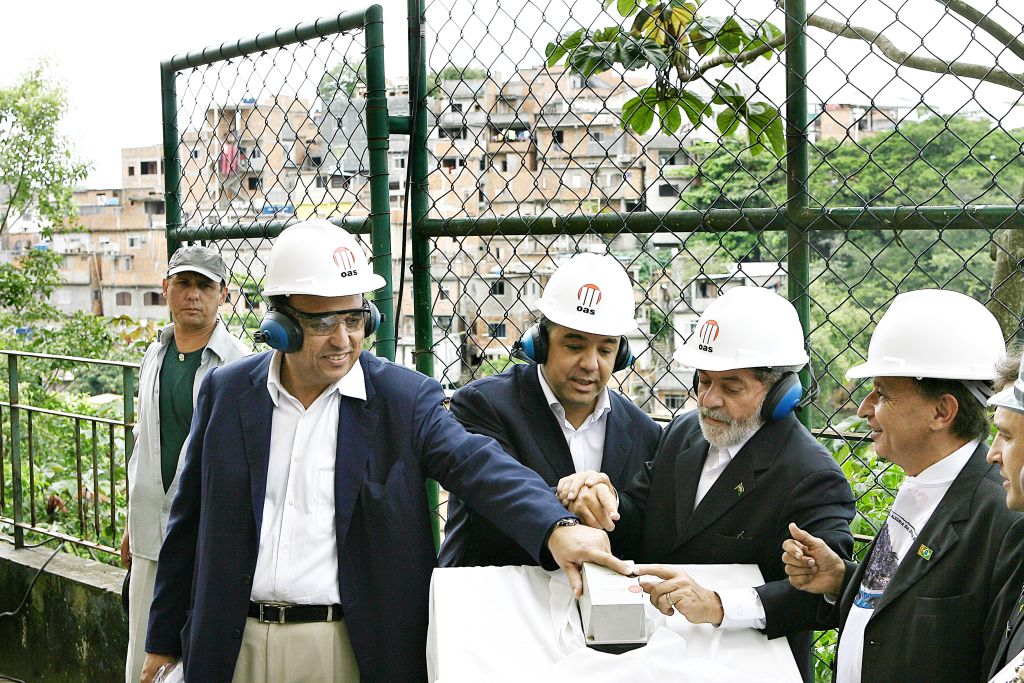
Then-Rio de Janeiro Governor Sérgio Cabral Filho and President of Brazil Luiz Inácio Lula da Silva visiting the Cantagalo–Pavão–Pavãozinho complex in 2007
