= Elephant Kraal, Ayutthaya =

Elephant paddock in Thailand

Coordinates: 14.376911°N 100.568963°E

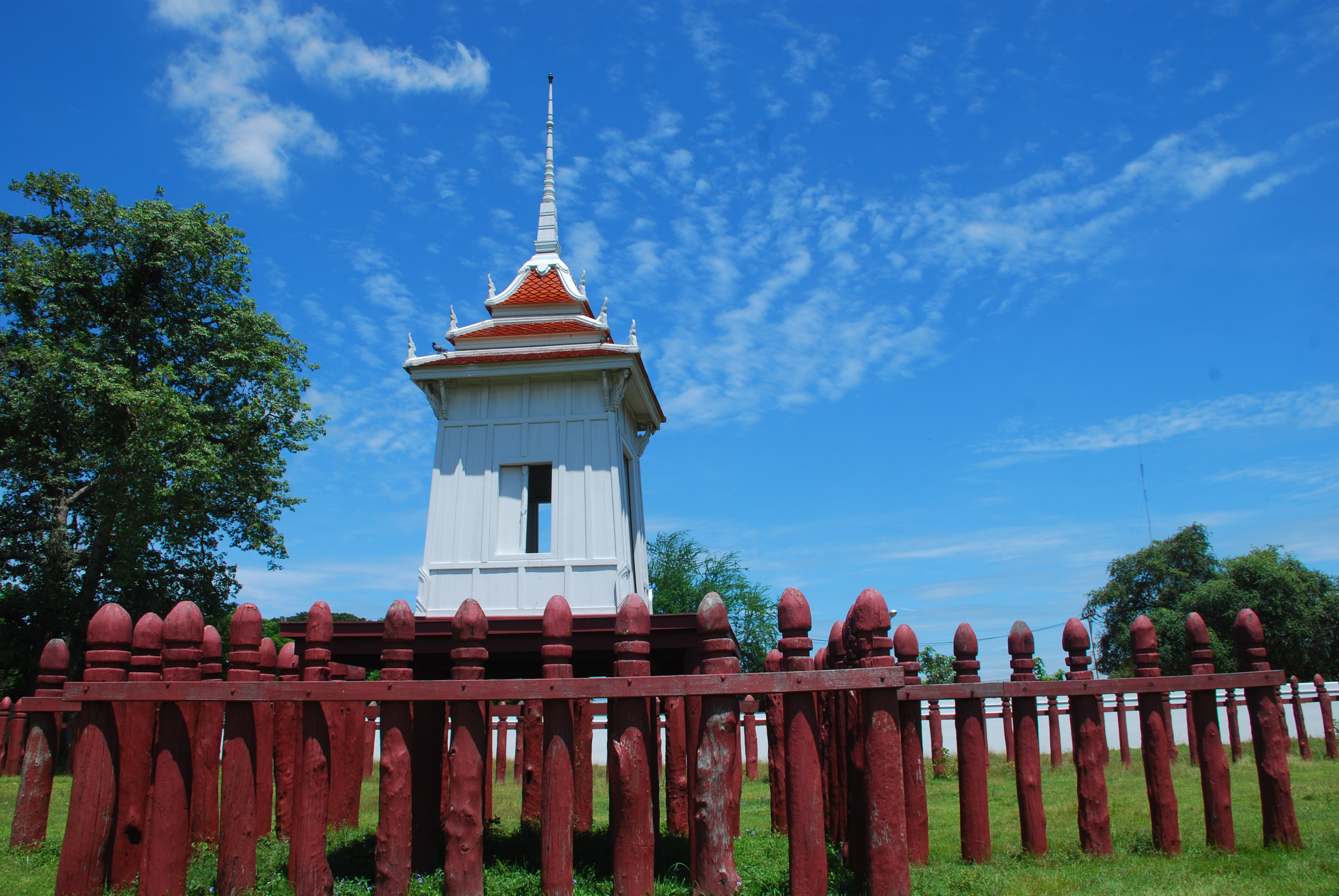
The elephant kraal in 2012, with Ganesha shrine in the centre

The Elephant Kraal of Ayutthaya or Elephant Corral of Ayutthaya (Thai: เพนียดคล้องช้าง, pronounced [pʰā.nîa̯t kʰlɔ́ːŋ t͡ɕʰáːŋ]) is an elephant enclosure in the Thai city of Ayutthaya. It has been a registered historical site since 1941.

== Background ==
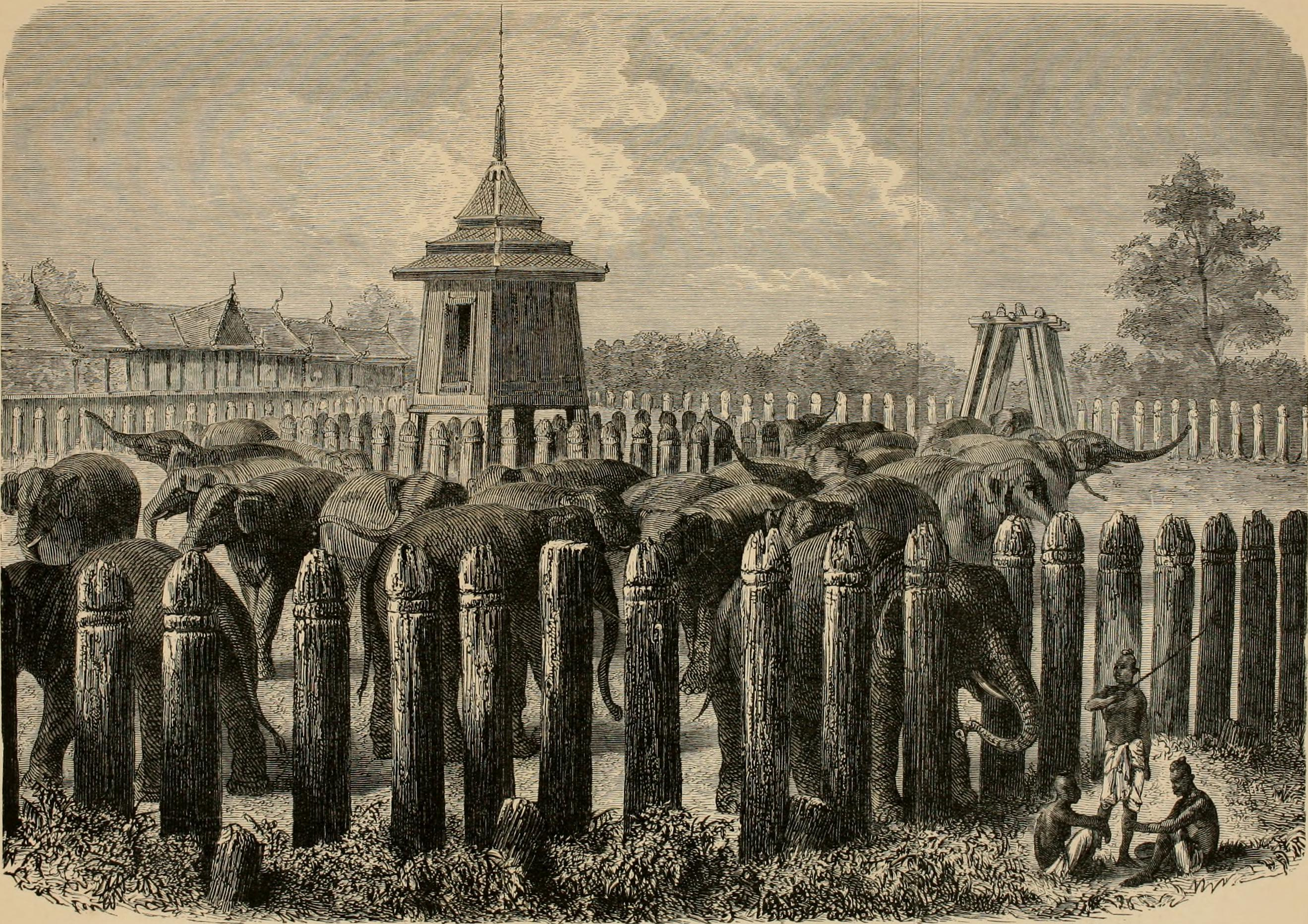
The elephant kraal in the 19th century

The kraal was originally located beside the viceregal residence of Chan Kasem Palace, in Hua Ro quarter, but it was moved to its current location in the city of Ayutthaya) during the reign of King Maha Chakkraphat (r. 1548–1569– ).

In the Ayutthaya period of Thai history, activities such as catching elephants were regarded as festive events for the upper classes as well as members of the royal family. Mahouts would herd a number of elephants from the forest to the kraal, where the king would select one to be captured. The kraal was built from logs lined up in a semicircle as a fence. In the centre sits a shrine to the elephant god Ganesha, according to Brahmanism and local animism.

The kraal was renovated in 1898, during the reign of King Chulalongkorn. Further repairs took place in 1957, during the rule of King Bhumibol Adulyadej.

The last formal elephant capture in Thailand occurred in 1893, during the reign of King Rama V, as a demonstration to the visiting tsesarevich of Russia (later Nicholas II).

The Elephant Kraal of Ayutthaya has been a registered historical site since 1941, according to the Fine Arts Department.

The elephant kraal is now a recognised ancient monument since 1941 by the Fine Arts Department.

== See also ==
- Elephants in Thailand
- Ayutthaya Historical Park
