= List of beaches in Ecuador =

This is a list of beaches in Ecuador.

== Beaches in Ecuador ==
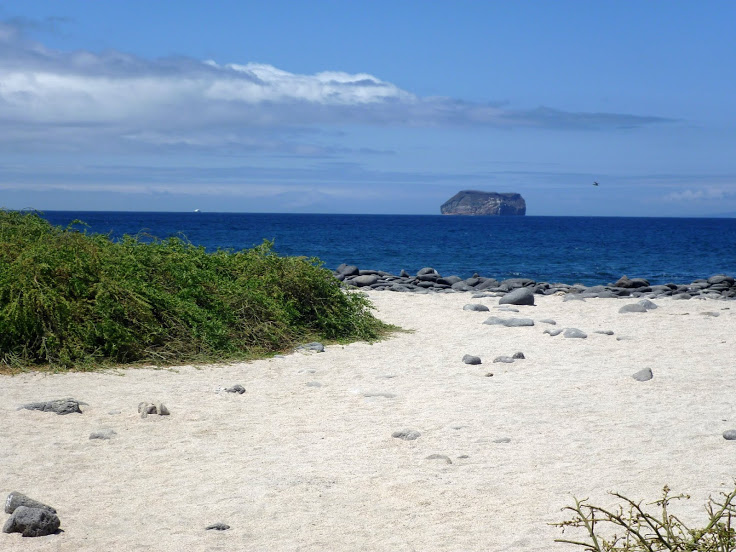
The Beach at North Seymour Island in the Galapagos

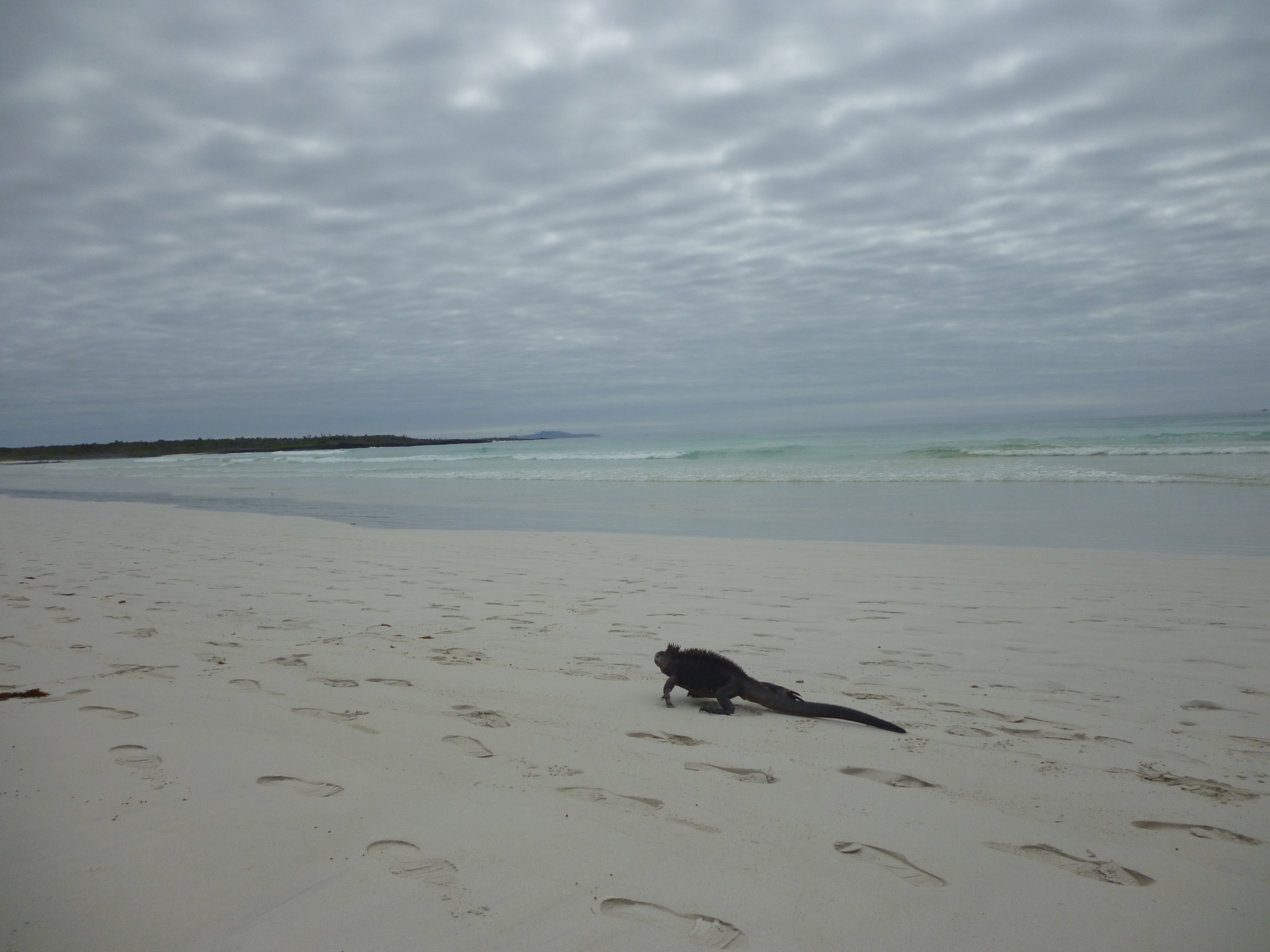
A Marine iguana (Amblyrhynchus cristatus) walking on the beach at Tortuga Bay, Santa Cruz Island Galapagos.

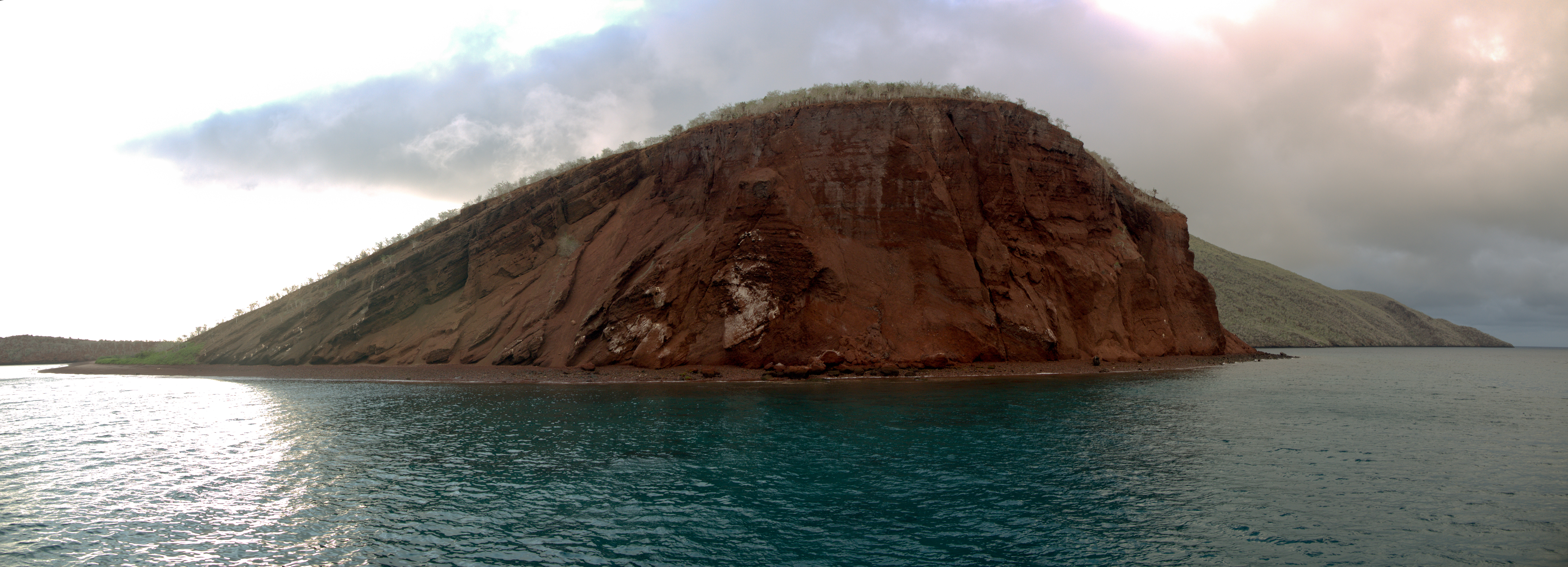
Panorama of Rábida (Jervis) Island

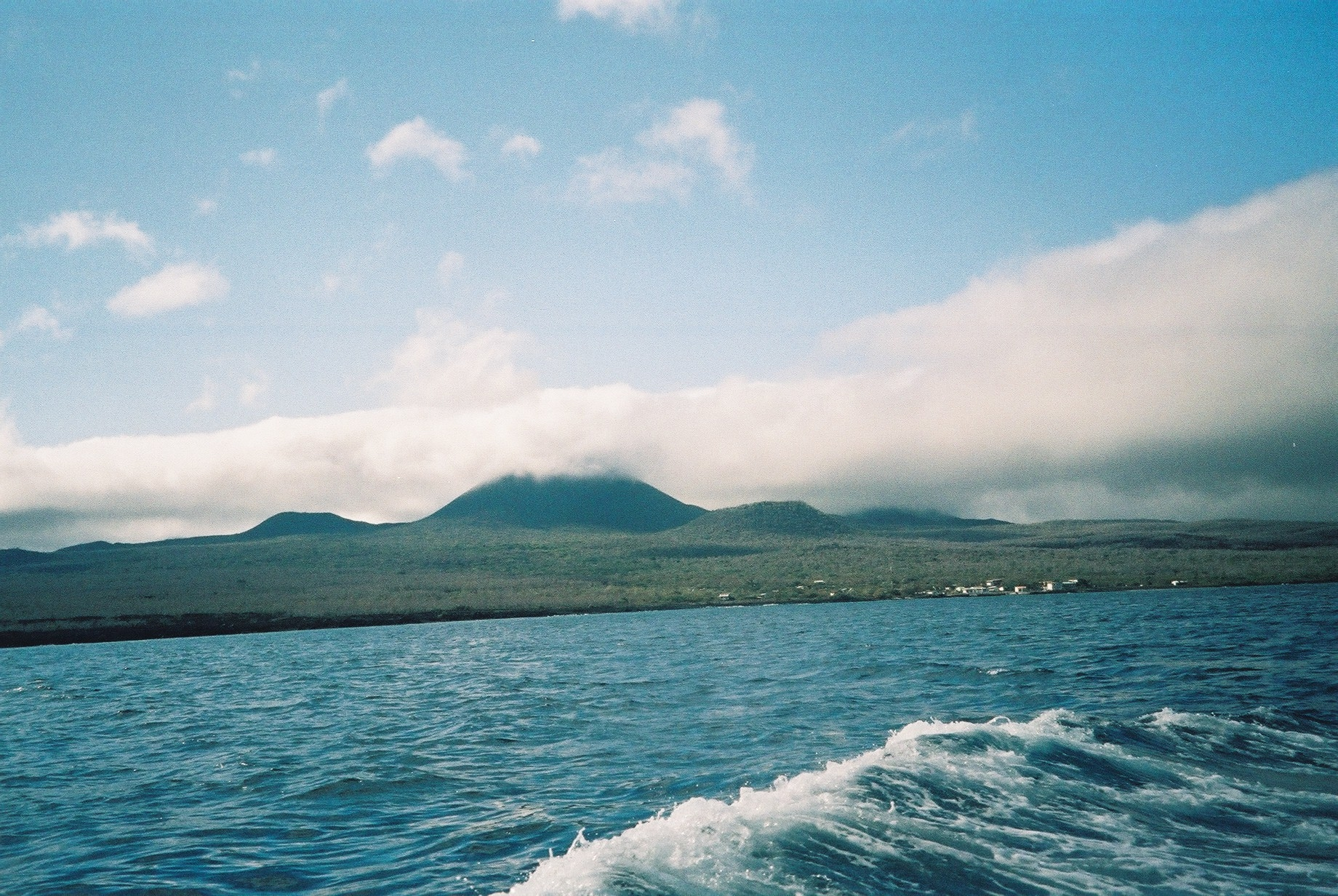
Floreana (Charles or Santa María) Island

- Atacames
- Bartolomé (Bartholomew) Island
- Darwin (Culpepper) Island
- Española (Hood) Island
- Fernandina (Narborough) Island
- Floreana (Charles or Santa María) Island
- Genovesa (Tower) Island
- Isabela (Albemarle) Island (Ecuador)
- Los Frailes
- Manta
- Marchena (Bindloe) Island
- Montañita
- Muisne
- Pinta (Abingdon) Island
- Pinzón (Duncan) Island
- Playas
- Puerto López
- Punta Carnero
- Salinas
- San Cristóbal Island, Galapagos
- Santa Cruz (Indefatigable) Island (Galápagos)
- Santa Fé (Barrington) Island
- Santiago (San Salvador, James) Island (Galápagos)
- Silver Island
- Tortuga Bay - Santa Cruz Island, Galápagos Islands
- Wolf (Wenman) Island

== See also ==
- List of beaches
