= The Amazing Race 6 (Latin American season) =

Season of television series

- Season 6
- Presented by: Toya Montoya; Jaime Arellano
- No. of teams: 11
- Winners: Giovanni López & Juan Carlos Estrada
- No. of legs: 13
- Distance traveled: 3,500 km (2,200 mi)
- No. of episodes: 13

Release
- Original network: Space; TC Televisión
- Original release: 5 October – 28 December 2014

Additional information
- Filming dates: 29 July 2014 – late August 2014

Series chronology
- ← Previous; Season 5

The Amazing Race 6 (also known as The Amazing Race: Ecuador and The Amazing Race on Space 4) is the sixth season of the Latin American version of the American reality show The Amazing Race. As in seasons prior, the show consisted of 11 teams of different nationalities competing, though this season took place entirely in Ecuador. The program was broadcast throughout Latin America on cable network Space, and in Ecuador on TC Televisión. The prize for the winning team was US$100,000, which was less than the prize given in previous seasons.

The program was hosted once again by Toya Montoya, who was joined by Ecuadorian presenter Jaime Arellano. This is the first time in the worldwide history of the format that a season was presented by a pair of hosts, as opposed to a single presenter.

Brothers-in-law from Ecuador, Giovanni López and Juan Carlos Estrada were the winners of this season.

== Production ==
=== Development and filming ===
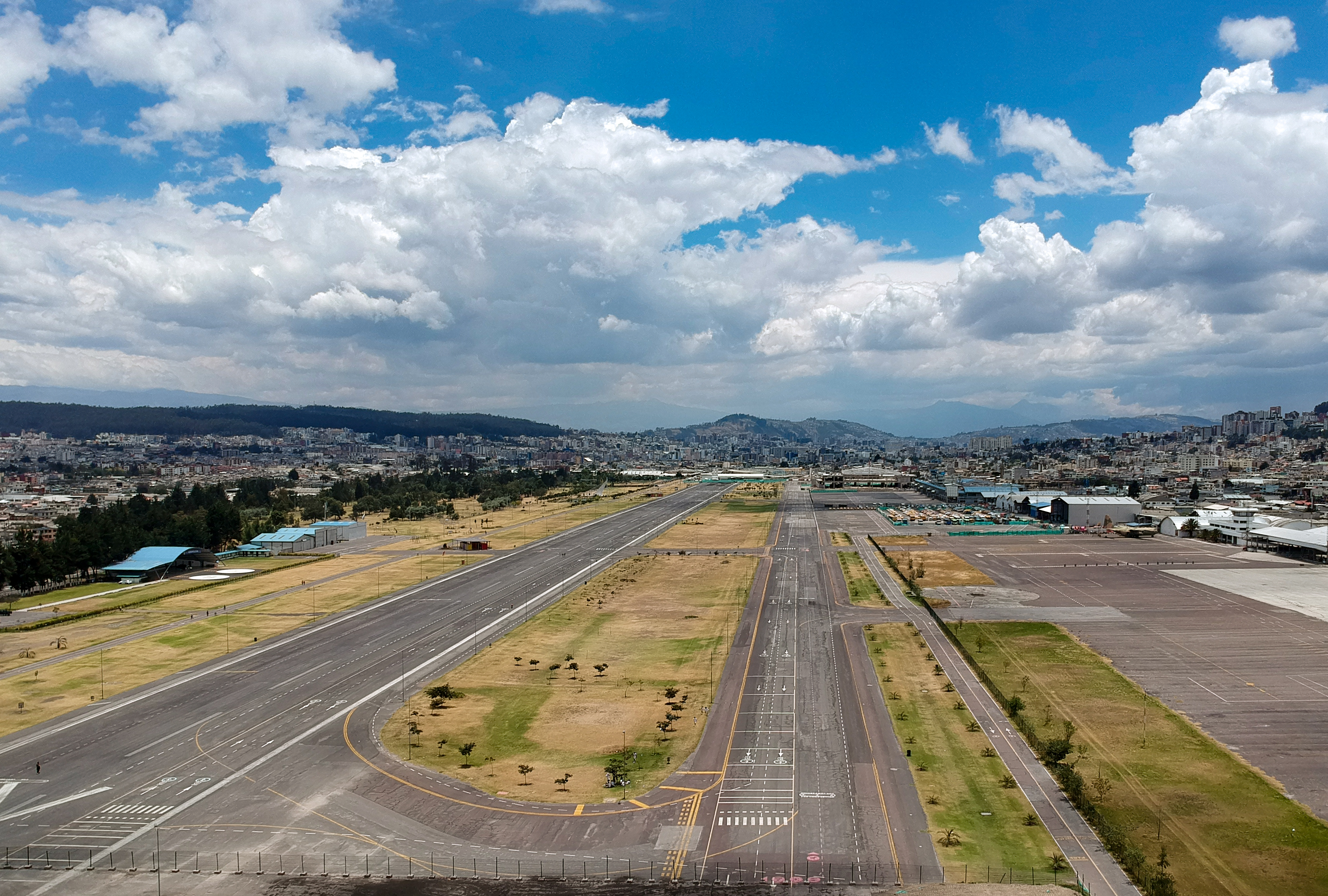
The former runway of the Old Mariscal Sucre International Airport in Quito, Ecuador served as the Starting Line of The Amazing Race: Ecuador.

At a press event on 28 July 2014, the theme of the season was revealed with the season set to solely film in Ecuador. Filming for this season began on 29 July 2014 and lasted between 25 and 30 days. None of the eliminated teams were present at the Finish Line.

=== Broadcast ===
The premiere of the new season aired in October 2014, airing in Latin America on Space, and in Ecuador on TC Televisión.

== Cast ==
Casting for this season was held from 1 May to 10 July 2014 for Latin America. The cast was revealed on 28 July 2014, and consisted of teams from Ecuador, Venezuela, Argentina, Mexico, Colombia, and Chile. The cast included Calle 7 Ecuador winner Dina "la China" Muñoz, TC Televisión anchor Christian Altamirano, and doctor to celebrities Juan Carlos Estrada.

Contestants	Age	Relationship	Hometown	Status
Ana Pérez	26	Student & Teacher	Caracas, Venezuela	Eliminated 1st (in Quito, Pichincha)
Alexander "Vantroy" Sánchez	36	Student & Teacher	Caracas, Venezuela	Eliminated 1st (in Quito, Pichincha)
Carlos Alonso	28	Boyfriends	Valencia, Venezuela	Eliminated 2nd (in Otavalo, Imbabura)
Orlando Betancourt	21	Boyfriends	Mérida, Venezuela	Eliminated 2nd (in Otavalo, Imbabura)
Audi Macías	23	Friends	Cuernavaca, Mexico	Medically removed (in Quito, Pichincha)
David Andres	25	Friends	Cuernavaca, Mexico	Medically removed (in Quito, Pichincha)
Clara Arauz	25	Sisters	Buenos Aires, Argentina	Eliminated 3rd (in Machachi, Pichincha)
Delfina Arauz	28	Sisters	Buenos Aires, Argentina	Eliminated 3rd (in Machachi, Pichincha)
Sonia Parada	26	Friends	Bogotá, Colombia	Eliminated 4th (in Shell Mera, Pastaza)
Gabriel Gartner	25	Friends	Bogotá, Colombia	Eliminated 4th (in Shell Mera, Pastaza)
Stefanía Marticorena	26	Married	Coquimbo, Chile	Eliminated 5th (in Cuenca, Azuay)
Felipe Céspedes	46	Married	Coquimbo, Chile	Eliminated 5th (in Cuenca, Azuay)
Martín Suarez	29	Dating	Santa Marta, Colombia	Eliminated 6th (in Salinas, Santa Elena)
Jenny Machado	26	Dating	Santa Marta, Colombia	Eliminated 6th (in Salinas, Santa Elena)
Christian Altamirano	26	Friends	Guayaquil, Ecuador	Eliminated 7th (in Olón, Santa Elena)
Dina Muñoz	23	Friends	Guayaquil, Ecuador	Eliminated 7th (in Olón, Santa Elena)
Juan Molina	51	Father & Daughter	Guadalajara, Mexico	Third Place
Cecilia Molina	24	Father & Daughter	Guadalajara, Mexico	Third Place
Javier Rodriguez	30	Partners	San Fernando, Argentina	Second Place
Nicolas Podestá	30	Partners	Buenos Aires, Argentina	Second Place
Giovanni López	44	Brothers-in-law	Guayaquil, Ecuador	Winners
Juan Carlos Estrada	45	Brothers-in-law	Guayaquil, Ecuador	Winners

Future appearances

In 2021, Dina Muñoz competed on Por amor o por dinero on Telemundo.

== Results ==
The following teams participated in the season, with their relationships at the time of filming. Note that this table is not necessarily reflective of all content broadcast on television due to inclusion or exclusion of some data. Placements are listed in finishing order:

Team	Position (by leg)												
Team	1	2	3	4	5	6	7	8	9	10	11	12	13
Giovanni & Juan Carlos	3rd	7th	3rd	3rd	5th	5th	3rd	3rd	3rd	1st	1st	2nd	1st
Javier & Nicolas	2nd	8th	1st	5th	4th	3rd	1st	2nd	1st	3rd	2nd	1st	2nd
Juan & Cecilia	5th	9th	8th	1stə^{4}	2nd^{5}	4th	6th	5th⊃	4th	2nd	3rd	3rd	3rd
Christian & Dina	10th	6th	5th	6th	3rd⊃	2nd	2nd	1st	2nd	4th	4th		
Martín & Jenny	4th	5th^{1}	7th	4th	6th^{⊂}_{⋑}	6th	4th	4th^{8}	5th	5th			
Stefanía & Felipe	1st	4th^{1}	2nd	2nd	1st	1stε^{7}	5th	6th⊂					
Sonia & Gabriel	8th	1st	4th	7th	7th⋐^{6}	7th							
Clara & Delfina	6th	2nd	6th	8th									
Audi & David	9th	3rd	9th^{3}										
Carlos & Orlando	7th	10th^{2}											
Ana & Vantroy	11th												

Key

- A red team placement indicates that the team was eliminated.
- A purple ε indicates that the team decided to use the Express Pass on that leg. A magenta ə indicates the team had previously been given the second Express Pass and used it on that leg.
- A blue team placement indicates that the team came in last on a non-elimination leg.
  - An underlined blue team placement indicates that the team had to perform a Speed Bump in the next leg.
- A brown ⊃ or a cyan ⋑ indicates that the team chose to use one of the two U-Turns in a Double U-Turn; ⊂ or ⋐ indicates the team who received it; ^{⊂}_{⋑} indicates that the team was U-Turned, but they used the second U-Turn on another team; ⊂⊃ around a leg number indicates a leg where the U-Turn was available but not used.
- An underlined leg number indicates that there was no mandatory rest period at the Pit Stop and all teams were ordered to continue racing, except for the last team to arrive who were both eliminated. The first place team was still awarded a prize for those legs.

Notes

1. ^^{a} ^{b} Stefanía & Felipe and Martín & Jenny initially arrived 1st and 2nd, respectively, but each team were issued 30-minute penalties for not washing the wool in the marked area during the Roadblock as the clue has specified. Their placements were dropped to 4th and 5th place, respectively.
2. Carlos & Orlando were issued a 1-hour penalty for interfering with the model during the Armar Detour. However, since they arrived at the Pit Stop last, they were eliminated without the 1-hour penalty being applied.
3. Audi & David elected to withdraw from the competition at the start of Leg 3 due to an injury Audi sustained at the Roadblock in Leg 1. While Audi was still hospitalised, Toya visited them to inform them of their elimination.
4. Juan & Cecilia used the Express Pass given to them by Stefanía & Felipe to bypass the Detour on Leg 4.
5. Juan & Cecilia initially arrived 2nd, but were issued a 15-minute penalty as they ignored the instructions in their clue and released their taxi at the U-Turn location. This did not affect their placement.
6. Sonia & Gabriel did not complete the other Detour as a result of being U-Turned and were issued a 2-hour penalty that was set to be applied at the Pit Stop. However, as they arrived at the Pit Stop last and were notified that it was a non-elimination leg, the 2-hour penalty was instead applied to their starting time in Leg 6.
7. Stefanía & Felipe used their Express Pass to bypass the second Roadblock on Leg 6. Before using the Express Pass, Stefanía elected to perform the Roadblock, and this is reflected in the total Roadblock count.
8. Martín & Jenny initially arrived 3rd, but they were issued a 30-minute penalty as they got on the bus after it had departed from the bus station, causing a safety hazard. Giovanni & Juan Carlos checked in during their penalty time, dropping Martín & Jenny to 4th.

== Prizes ==
The prize for each leg is awarded to the first-place team for that leg. Unlike other versions of The Amazing Race, occasionally a prize for second-place was also awarded.

- Leg 1 – Two Express Passes (Pases Directos) – an item that can be used to skip any one task of the team's choosing. The winning team keeps one for themselves but must relinquish the second to another team before the end of the fourth leg.
- Leg 2 – Two Samsung Tablets.
- Leg 3 – Two Samsung Tablets.
- Leg 4 – Two Samsung Tablets.
- Leg 5 – Two Samsung Tablets.
- Leg 6:
  - 1st Place – Two Samsung Tablets.
  - 2nd Place – A year's free subscription to CNT television.
- Leg 7 – Two Samsung Tablets.
- Leg 8 – Two Samsung Tablets.
- Leg 9:
  - 1st Place – Two Samsung Galaxy S5's.
  - 2nd Place – Two Samsung Tablets.
- Leg 10:
  - 1st Place – Two Samsung Galaxy S5's.
  - 2nd Place – Two Samsung Tablets.
- Leg 11:
  - 1st Place – Two Samsung Galaxy S5's.
  - 2nd Place – Two Samsung Tablets.
- Leg 12:
  - 1st Place – Two Samsung Galaxy S5's.
  - 2nd Place – Two Samsung Tablets.
- Leg 13:
  - 1st Place – US$100,000
  - 2nd Place – A four-night trip for four to Walt Disney World.
  - 3rd Place – Four tickets for a four-day trip on Ecuador's Tren Crucero.

== Race summary ==
Route Map.

Destinations	Air travel Rail travel Water travel Bus travel Helicopter travel Bicycle travel Gondola travel
Route Markers	Desvio (Detour) Obstáculo (Roadblock) Retorno (U-Turn); Multa (Speed Bump) Parada (Pit Stop)

=== Leg 1 (Pichincha) ===
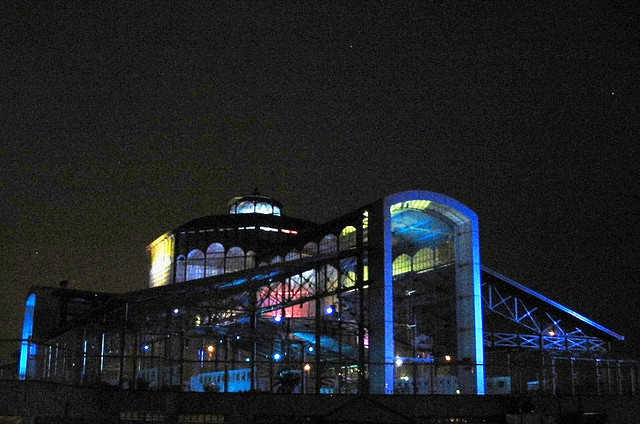
Teams ended the first leg at the Cristal Palace in Quito.

Airdate: October 6, 2014

- Quito, Pichincha Province, Ecuador (Old Mariscal Sucre International Airport – Parque Bicentenario de Quito (in Spanish)) (Starting Line)
- Quito (TelefériQo)
- Quito (Cruz Loma Hill)
- Quito (La Ronda Street – Intersection of Morales Street & Joaquín Paredes Street)
- Quito (24 de Mayo Boulevard)
- Quito (Itchimbía Cultural Center (in Spanish) – Cristal Palace)

In this season's first Roadblock, one team member had to ride an off-road bicycle to the bottom of Cruz Loma hill to receive their next clue.

Additional tasks

- At the former Mariscal Sucre International Airport, teams had to search for a traditional dancer with the Ecuador tourism promotional logo on their clothes and bring the dancer to Toya and Jaime to receive their first clue.
- At the TelefériQo, teams had to ride the cable car to the top to find their next clue.
- On La Ronda street, one team member had to put on a giant muñeco costume and walk down La Ronda Street to 24 de Mayo Boulevard to receive a Claro tablet with their next clue.

=== Leg 2 (Pichincha → Imbabura) ===
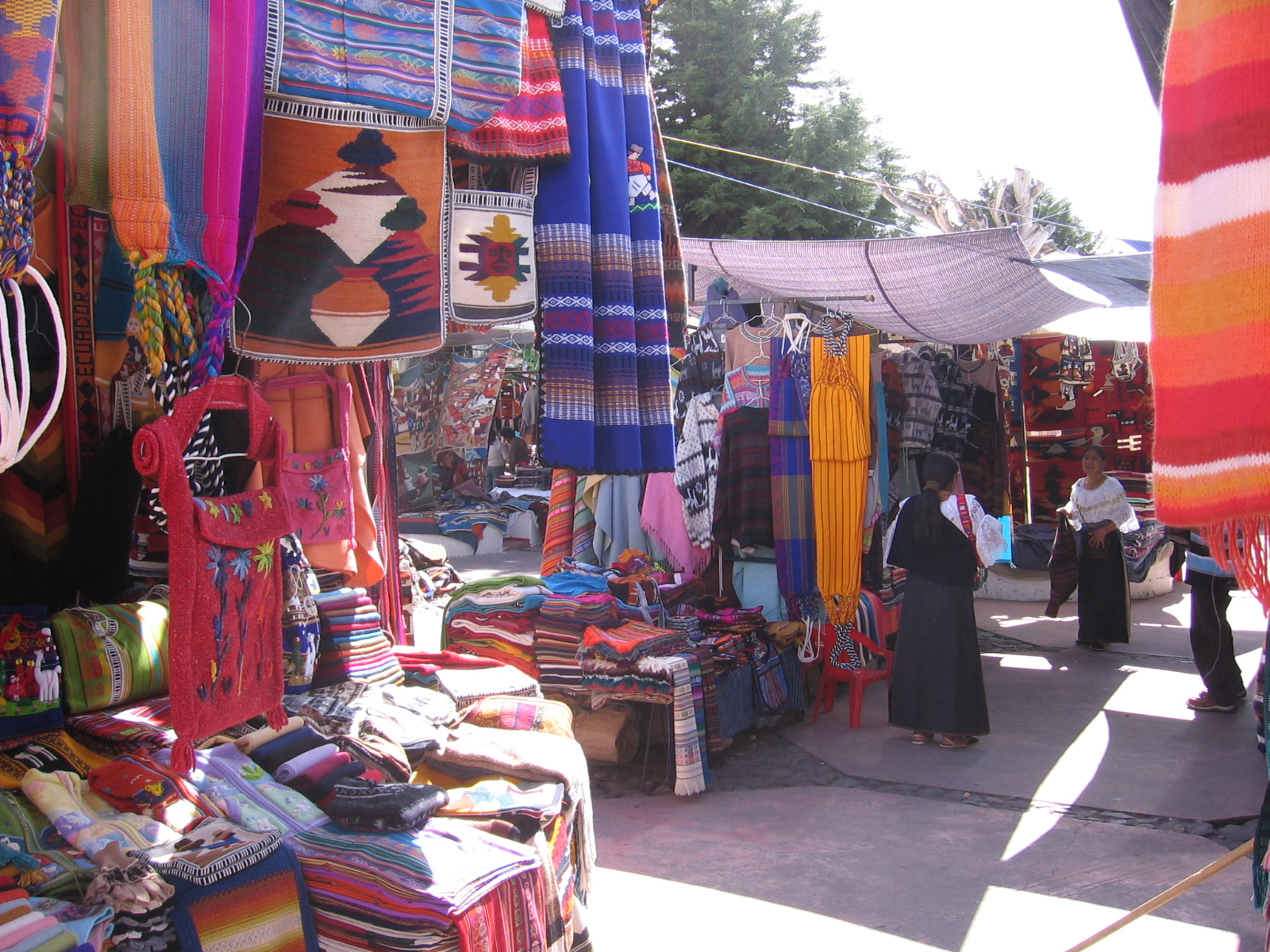
One Detour task required teams to set up a stall in the market of Otavalo.

Airdate: October 13, 2014

- Quito (Terminal Terrestre) to Otavalo, Imbabura Province
- Otavalo (González Suárez Square)
- Otavalo (Artesanal de los Ponchos Market or Kinti Wasi Intercultural Center)
- Otavalo (Peguche Waterfall – Fakcha Llakta Solar Calendar)
- Otavalo (Araque Waterpark to Hotel Puerto Lago)

This season's first Detour was a choice between Armar (Assemble) or Tejer (Weave). In Armar, teams had to travel to the market and properly set up a stall using a completed stall for reference to receive their next clue. In Tejer, teams made their way to the Kinti Wasi Intercultural Center. There, they would have to use a loom to weave four traditional friendship bracelets that each followed a specific pattern to receive their next clue. For each Detour, there were only five workstations available.

In this leg's Roadblock, one team member had to load wool into a traditional carrying sack and search the area for Josefina, who would give them natural soap made from water and aloe to wash the wool with. They then had to climb up to the washing station to receive their next clue.

Additional tasks

- At González Suárez Square, teams found a Claro tablet that instructed them to properly braid a local's hair in a traditional manner to receive their next clue.
- At Araque Waterpark, teams had to row a traditional reed boat across the water to reach the Pit Stop.

=== Leg 3 (Imbabura → Pichincha) ===
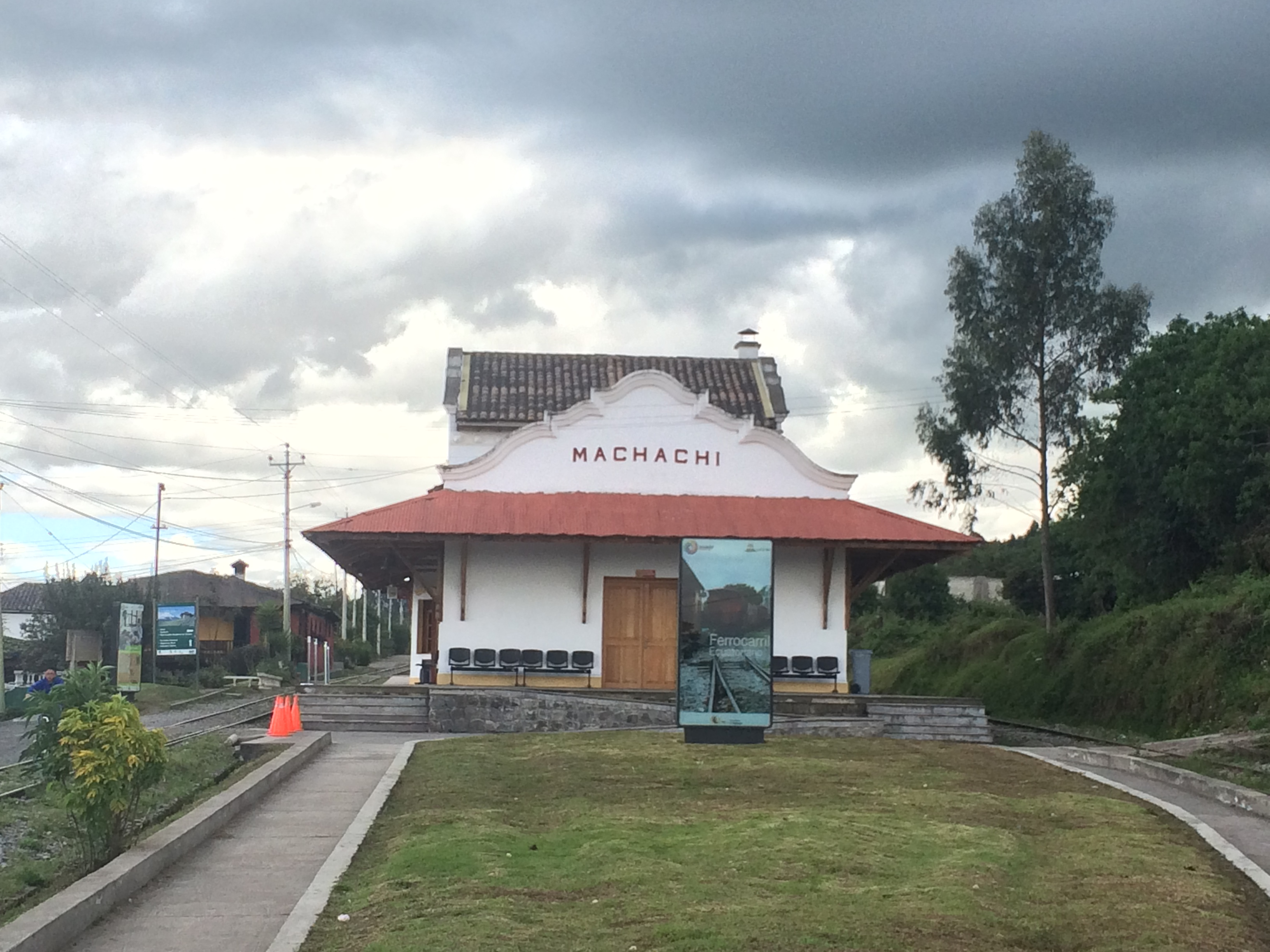
Teams travelled by train to Machachi from the Chimbacalle Train Station in Quito.

Airdate: October 20, 2014

- Otavalo to Quito, Pichincha Province (Terminals Terrestes)
- Quito (Chimbacalle Train Station)
- Quito (Hotel Quito) (Overnight Rest)
- Quito (Chimbacalle Train Station) to Machachi (Aloasi Train Station)
- Machachi (Ugshapamba Bee Farm)
- Machachi (Sierraloma Lodge)
- Machachi (Hacienda El Porvenir – Cotopaxi Ropes Course)
- Machachi (Hacienda El Porvenir)

In this leg's first Roadblock, one team member had to climb the high-altitude ropes and agility course above the lodge. They had to make their way to many stations on the course, each of which was marked with a number. Teams had to add up the numbers to reach a total of 24 before leaping off a tall platform and getting their next clue.

In this leg's second Roadblock, the team member who did not perform the previous Roadblock had to complete the Cotopaxi ropes course and retrieve a flag from the end. The flag could be exchanged for a Samsung tablet with their next clue on it.

Additional task

- At Ugshapamba Bee Farm, teams received a Claro beeper that they had to keep with them for the rest of the leg. Teams had to enter the orchard area and plant a circular arrangement of plants following a given example to receive their next clue.

=== Leg 4 (Pichincha) ===
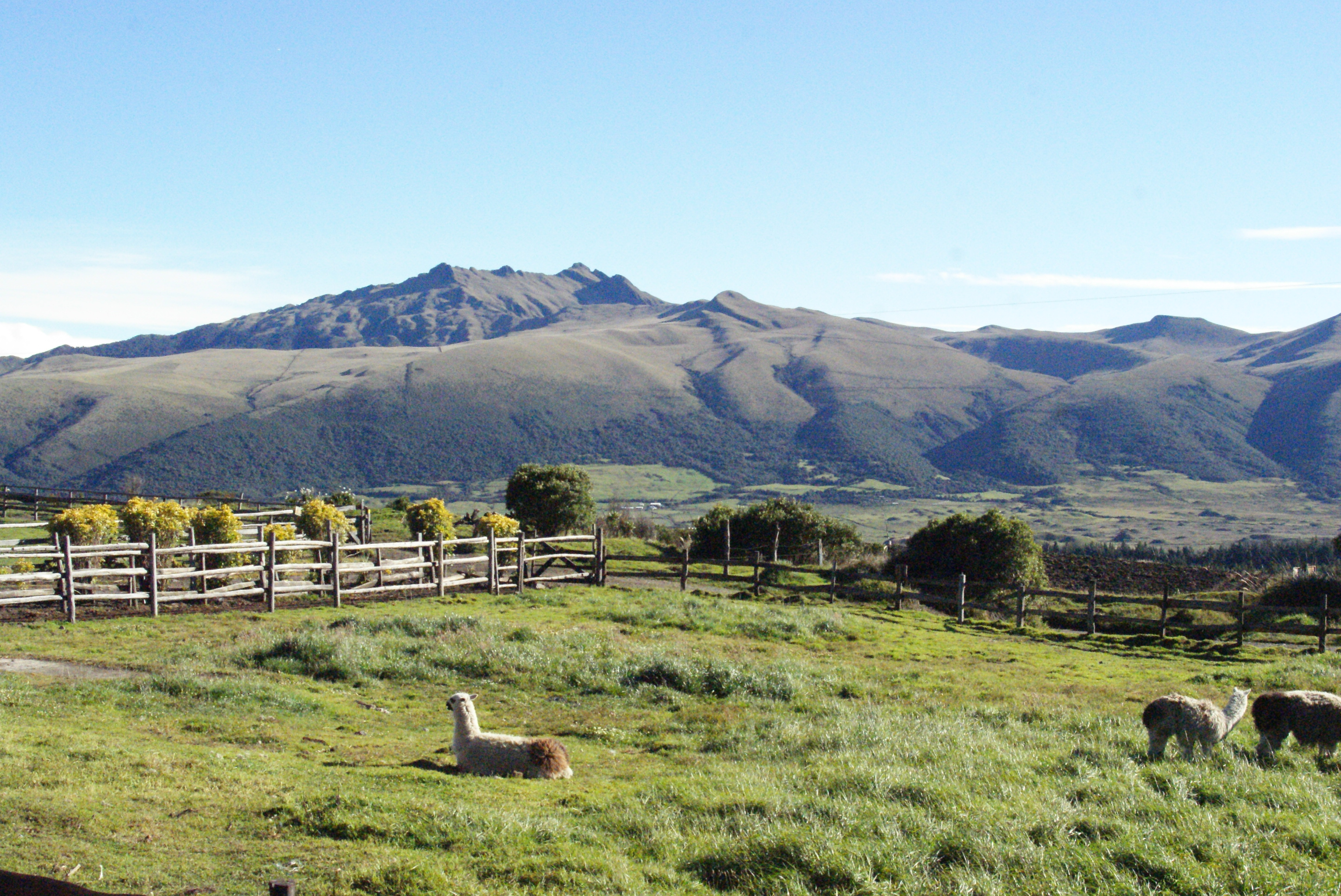
The tasks of the fourth leg were set on the Hacienda El Porvenir at the base of Cotopaxi.

Airdate: October 27, 2014

- Machachi (Hacienda El Porvenir – Field)
- Machachi (Hacienda El Porvenir – Dock)
- Machachi (Hacienda El Porvenir – El Potrero de la Dorada)
- Machachi (Hacienda El Porvenir – Loma del Cóndor)

In this leg's Roadblock, one team member had to stand behind a designated line and throw an axe into a red-painted target on a piece of wood to receive their next clue.

For their Speed Bump, Juan & Cecilia had to use a local tool to cut and harvest grass until they had filled a bag before they could continue on to the Detour.

This leg's Detour was a choice between Cintas (Ribbons) or Enlace (Tie Up). In Cintas, teams had to rid a horse along a marked course and then use a tiny stick to spear a ring attached to a hanging ribbon to receive their next clue. In Enlace, teams had to successfully throw a lasso around a fake bull head to receive their next clue.

Additional tasks

- At El Potrero de la Dorada, teams received a CNT tablet that instructed them to search a marked area for a horseshoe to receive their next clue.
- After finding the horseshoe, teams would be given a pedometer and had to count the number of steps they took to reach the Pit Stop.

=== Leg 5 (Pichincha → Tungurahua) ===
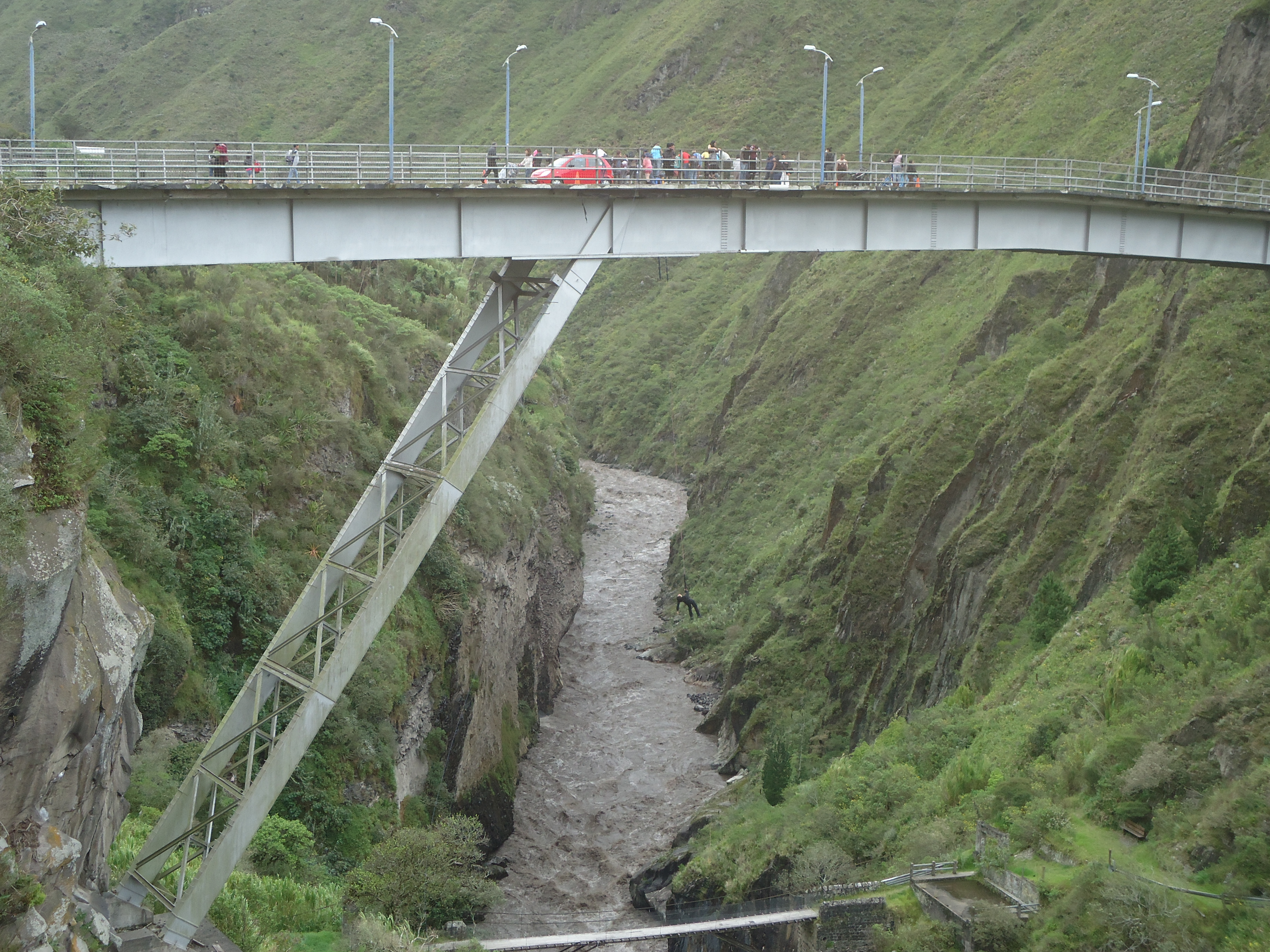
The Roadblock in Baños de Agua Santa required teams to take part in the extreme sport of puenting.

Airdate: November 3, 2014

- Baños de Agua Santa, Tungurahua Province (Parque Sebastián Acosta)
- Baños de Agua Santa (Àmbato Street)
- Baños de Agua Santa (Virgin Thermal Baths)
- Baños de Agua Santa (San Martín Canopy or La Chamana Falls)
- Baños de Agua Santa (Palomino Flores Park)
- Baños de Agua Santa (San Francisco Bridge)
- Baños de Agua Santa (Parque de la Familia de Baños overlooking the Agoyán Hydroelectric Dam)

This leg's Detour was a choice between Aire (Air) or Agua (Water). In Aire, teams had to make their way to the San Martín Canopy, where they would complete a high-altitude course. They had to ride a zip-line, then cross the Tibet bridge, a bridge with interspaced metal planks, followed by a rock-climb and another zip-line to receive their next clue. In Agua, both team members had to use a mechanical ascender to climb to the top of the La Chamana Falls and ring the bell at the top to receive their next clue.

In this leg's Roadblock, one team member had to take part in the sport of puenting, where they would jump from a height of 100 m (330 ft) off a bridge while tied to a rope harness and swing below the bridge in a pendulum fashion, to receive a Samsung tablet with their next clue.

Additional task

- At Àmbato Street, teams had to properly make melcocha, a local honey-based sweet, by pulling and tugging the raw ingredients until they turned to a specific colour. Once it was done, they would have to properly pack five pieces of the melocha in the traditional manner to receive their next clue.

=== Leg 6 (Tungurahua → Pastaza) ===
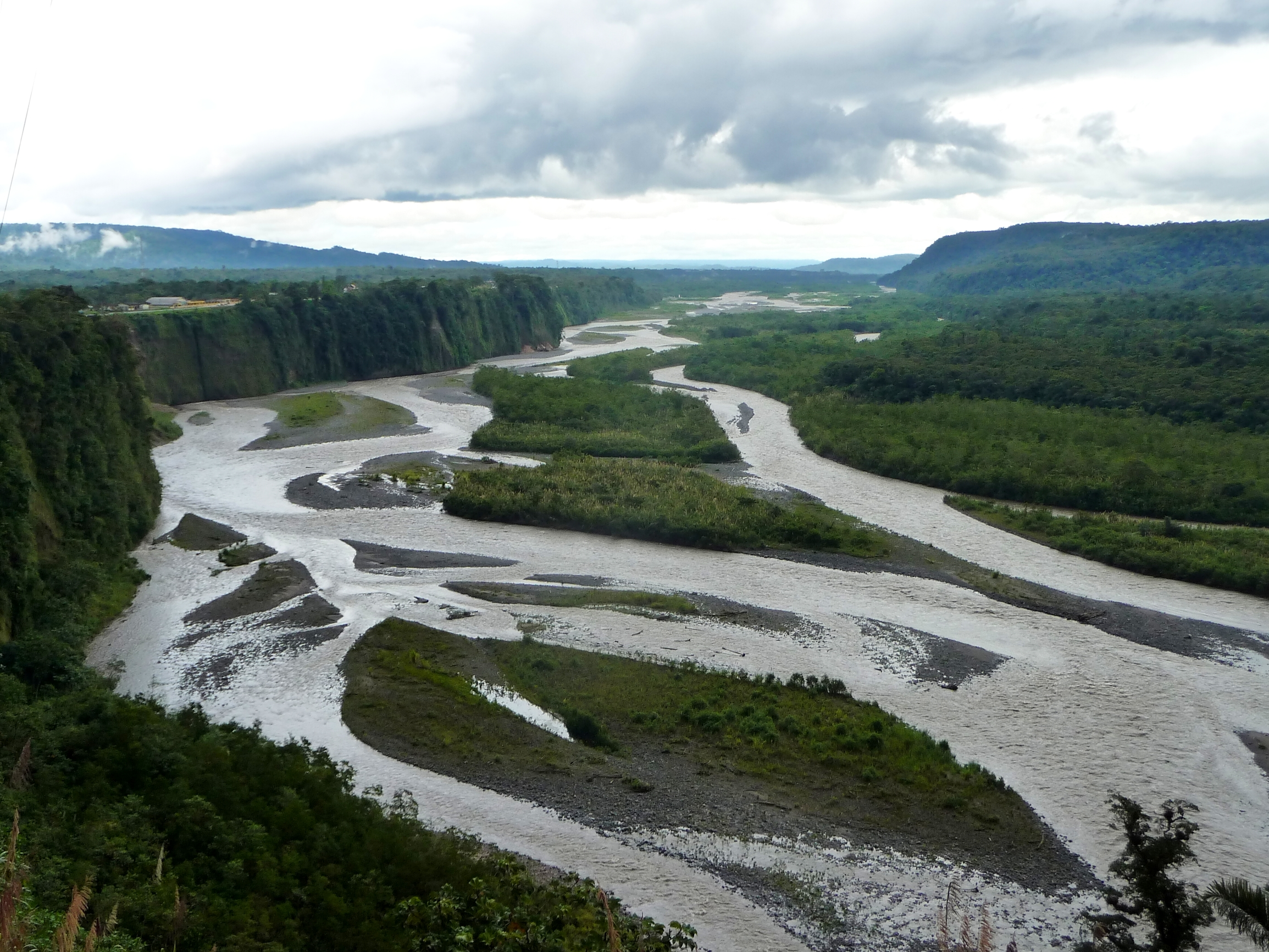
Teams began the leg by rafting down the Pastaza River.

Airdate: November 10, 2014

- Shell Mera, Pastaza Province (Alpayaco and Pastaza Rivers Meeting Point)
- Shell Mera (Presidential Cabin)
- Shell Mera (Yaicuna House)
- Shell Mera (Iwia Training Camp)
- Shell Mera (Casa del Arbol)

In this leg's first Roadblock, one team member had to utilize an indigenous blowgun known as a putuna to hit a hanging fruit to receive their next clue.

For their Speed Bump, Sonia & Gabriel had to learn and perform a local indigenous welcome ritual before they could continue on to the second Roadblock.

In this leg's second Roadblock, one team member, regardless of who performed the previous Roadblock, had to eat five live chontacuros, a type of worm, to receive their next clue.

Additional tasks

- At the rivers' meeting point, teams would have to ride an inflatable raft down the river to reach the Presidential Cabin. Two teams could ride in each raft. Once at the cabin, teams had to perform a local ritual to get their next clue.
- At the training camp, teams would have to complete a grueling military training course, which include performing a face-first bungee jump called the 'Angel Jump', to receive their next clue.

=== Leg 7 (Pastaza → Chimborazo) ===
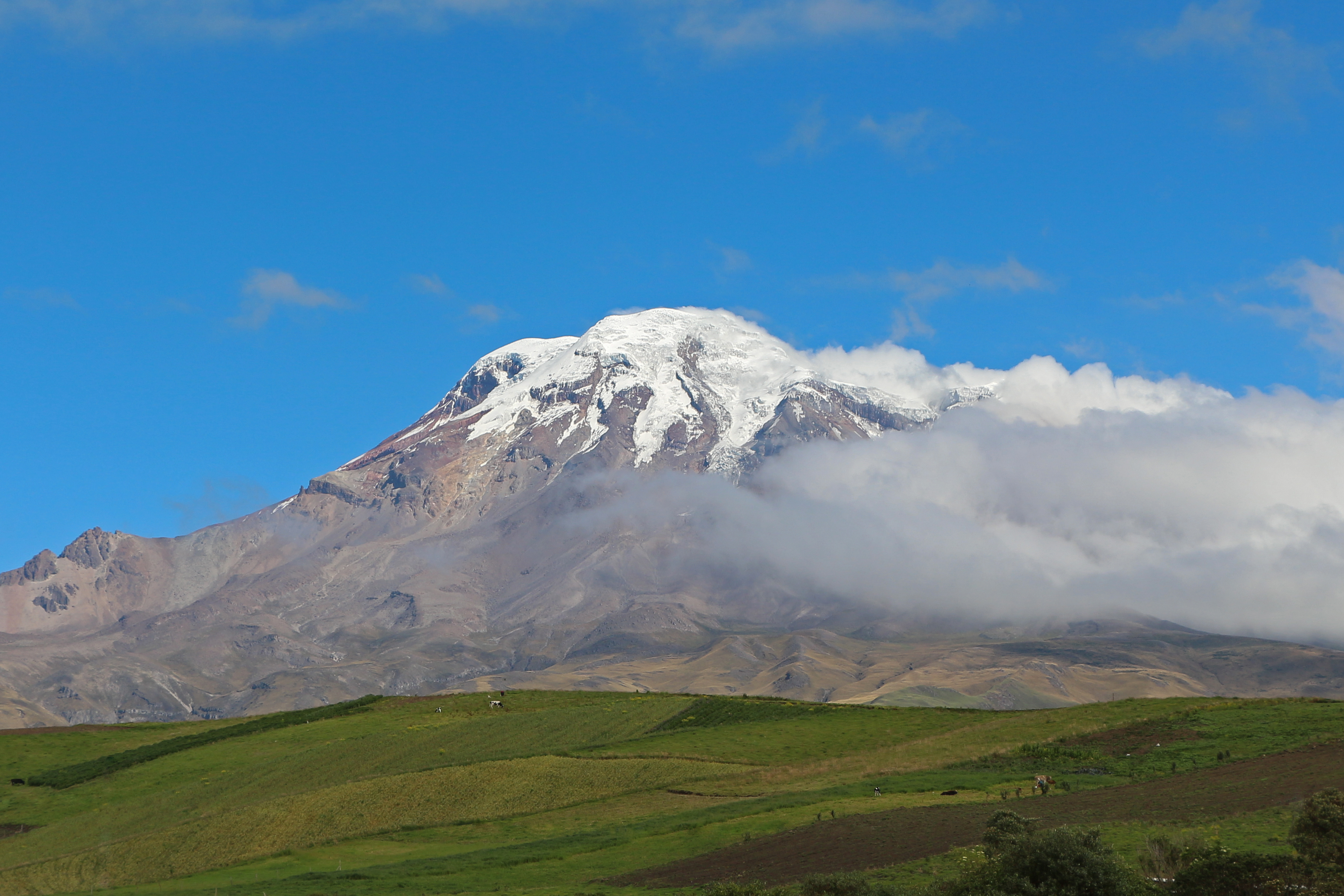
Teams concluded the seventh leg at the base of Chimborazo.

Airdate: November 17, 2014

- Baños de Agua Santa, Tungurahua (Terminal Terrestre de Baños) to Riobamba, Chimborazo Province (Terminal Terrestre de Riobamba)
- Riobamba (Post Office of Ecuador)
- Chimborazo (Cordillera Sector)
- Chimborazo (La Chorrera Alta)
- Chimborazo (Chimborazo Lodge Marco Cruz)
- Chimborazo (Wildlife Protection Reserve of Mount Chimborazo (in Spanish))

In this leg's Roadblock, the chosen team member had to rappel 60 metres (200 ft) down the sheer face of a cliff. However, their partner first had to follow a path down to the bottom and wave a flag before they could begin their descent. Once they were reunited, teams would get their next clue.

This leg's Detour was a choice between Hielero (Iceman) or Arriero (Horseman). In Hielero, teams had to use a traditional cloth to carry a "Chimborazo Ice Block" across the area to receive their next clue. In Arriero, teams had to take two alpacas from a pen and guide them to a local horseman to receive their next clue.

Additional tasks

- Teams had to search through the post office to find a key, and then use it to open the many mailboxes there until they found one with a Samsung Galaxy S5 inside with their next clue.
- At the Chimborazo Community, teams had to find a marked house, set up a TV antenna on the roof and tune in to TC Channel to receive their next clue.

=== Leg 8 (Chimborazo → Azuay) ===
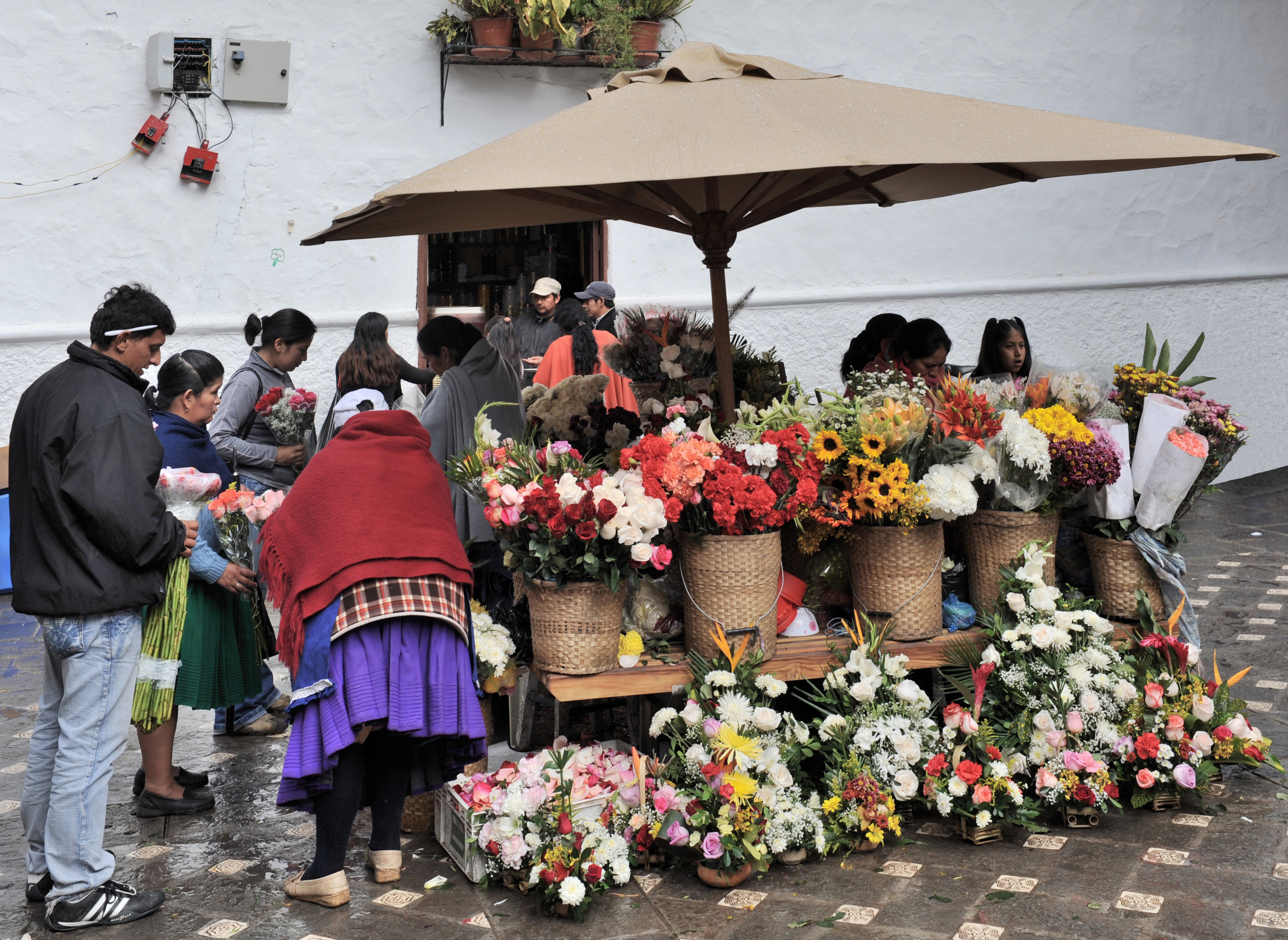
For one Detour option in Cuenca, teams had to create a floral arrangement.

Airdate: November 24, 2014

- Riobamba to Cuenca, Azuay Province (Terminals Terrestres)
- Cuenca (San Blas Park)
- Cuenca (Hotel Oro Verde) (Overnight Rest)
- Cuenca (Plaza de las Flores or Plaza del Otorongo)
- Cuenca (Parque de la Madre)
- Cuenca (Social Circus)
  - Cuenca (Parque Inclusivo)
- Cuenca (Pumapungo Mines)

This leg's Detour was a choice between Flores (Flowers) or Mural. In Flores, teams had to travel to Plaza de las Flores and create a flower arrangement that matched an example. In Mural, teams had to travel to Plaza del Otorongo and paint a mural that matched an example. After the Detour, teams would be directed to the Blind U-Turn at Parque de la Madre.

For their Speed Bump, Juan & Cecilia had to pick up eight backpack and bring them to Parque Inclusivo to donate them before moving on to the Roadblock.

In this leg's Roadblock, one team member had to climb the acrobatic cloth like a circus performer and perform four midair poses – the house, the bed, the star and the box – to receive their next clue.

Additional tasks

- At San Blas Park, teams had to convince people on the street to be weighed on a scale until they had accumulated a total of 1,000 pounds (450 kg) to receive their next clue.
- At Hotel Oro Verde, teams signed up for departure times the following morning.
- Along the way to the Pit Stop at Pumapungo Mines, teams had to use a Samsung wrist device to time how long it took them to climb to the top of the structure that the Pit Stop was on.

=== Leg 9 (Azuay → Galápagos) ===
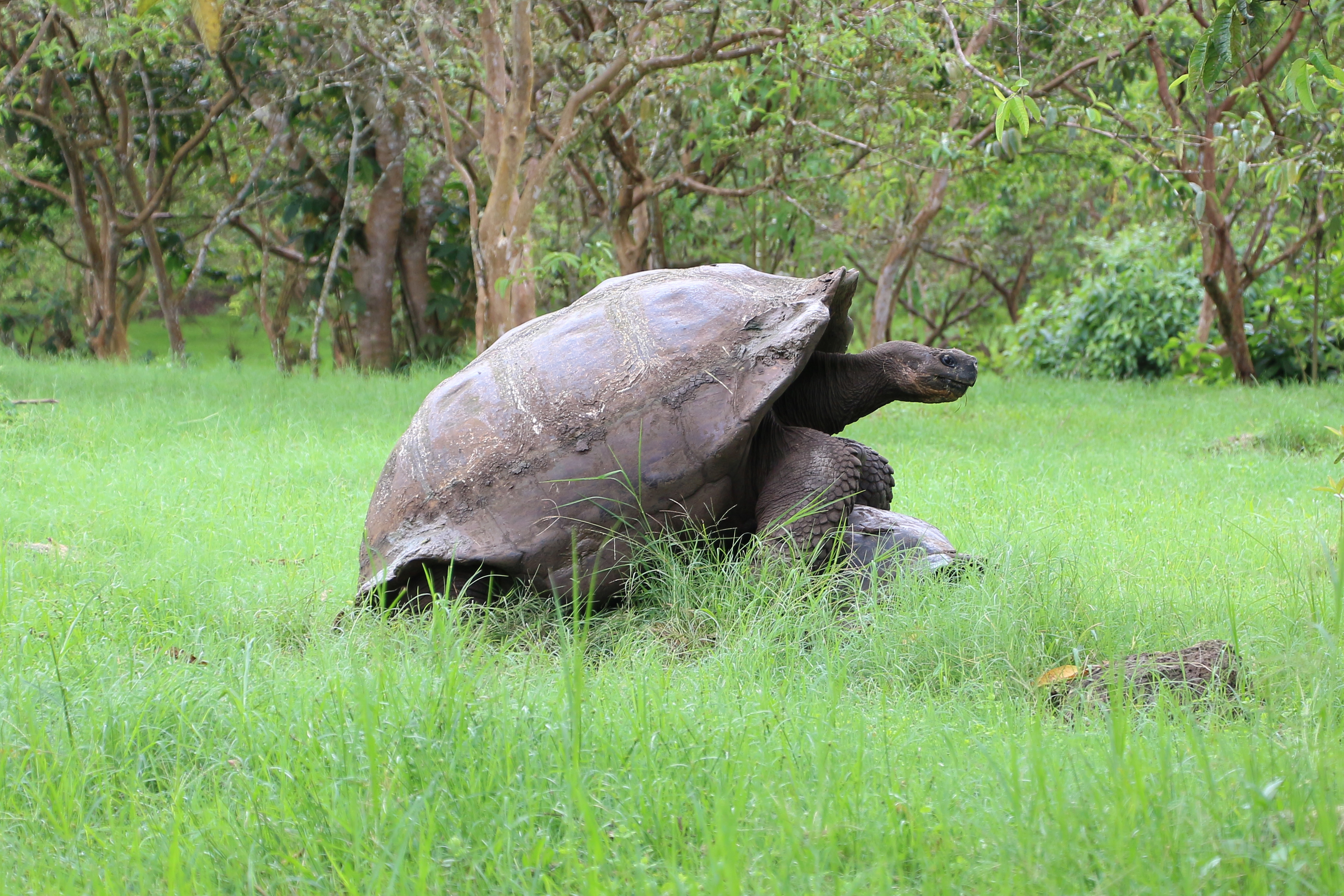
On the Galápagos Islands, teams had to take a selfie with the islands' giant tortoises.

Airdate: December 1, 2014

- Cuenca (Claro Information Centre)
- Cuenca (Mariscal Lamar International Airport) to Baltra Island, Galapagos Province (Seymour Airport)
- Baltra Island (Itabaca Canal)
- Santa Cruz Island (Muelle Municipal)
- Santa Cruz Island (Franklin's Bay)
- Santa Cruz Island (German Beach)
- Puerto Ayora (Muelle Publico Municipal)
- Santa Cruz Island (Galápagos National Park)
- Santa Cruz Island (Finca El Manzanillo)
- Santa Cruz Island (El Garrapatero Beach)

In this leg's first Roadblock, one team member had to dive into the water and search among the coral reefs for some artificial coral coloured with Race colours, which could then be traded for their next clue.

In this leg's second Roadblock, the team member who did not perform the previous Roadblock had to help with reforesting efforts by planting 10 Scalesia trees in a marked area a long distance away to receive a CNT tablet with their next clue. They could only carry two tree saplings at a time along the marked path.

Additional tasks

- At the beginning of the leg, teams were given a set of geographical coordinates and instructed to travel to the Claro Information Centre to look them up on the internet. The coordinates would lead them to Baltra Island, and they would get their next clue.
- At Itabaca Canal, teams would have to get into a kayak and paddle themselves across to Santa Cruz Island.
- At German Beach, teams would receive a questionnaire about the importance of the Galapagos Islands to humanity, and would have to search among many flags on the beach for the correct answers to these five questions to receive their next clue.
- At Finca El Manzanillo, teams would find decorative giant tortoise shells. Teams had to pick up a Samsung Galaxy S5 and use the Dual Camera mode to take a selfie with a real tortoise in the background to receive their next clue.

=== Leg 10 (Galápagos → Santa Elena) ===
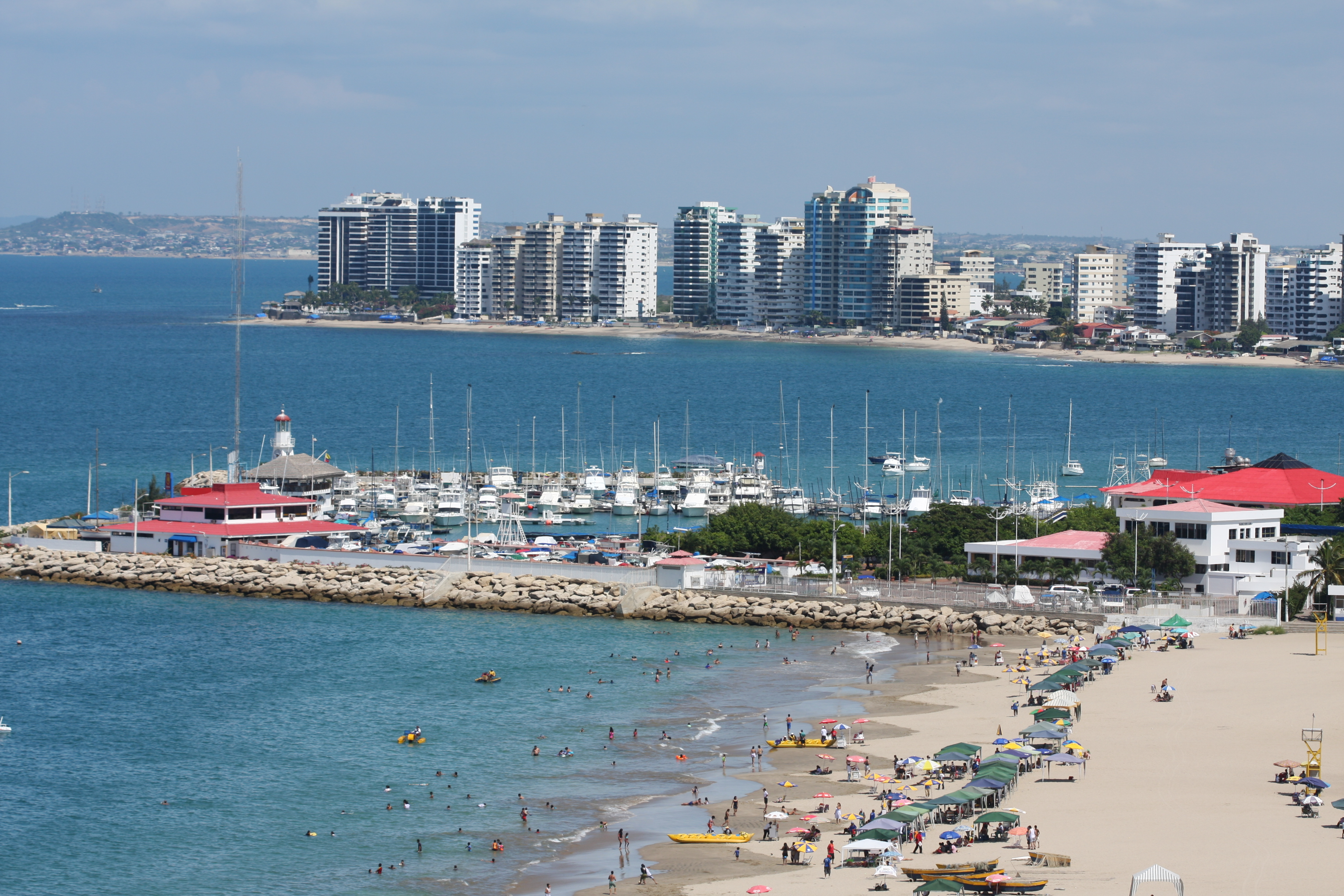
The Roadblock in Salinas took place in the waters off Chipipe Beach.

Airdate: December 8, 2014

- Baltra Island (Seymour Airport) to Guayaquil (José Joaquín de Olmedo International Airport)
- Guayaquil to Santa Elena, Santa Elena Province (Terminals Terrestres)
- Santa Elena to Salinas
- Salinas (San Lorenzo Beach)
- Salinas (San Lorenzo Beach – Malecon)
- Salinas (Chipipe Beach (in Spanish))
- Salinas (La Chocolatera Reservation (in Spanish) – Mirador El Faro)

For their Speed Bump, Martín & Jenny had to get onto an inflatable raft while it was towed by a speed boat and stay on the raft while the boat made some wild manoeuvres before they could continue on to the Detour.

This leg's Detour was a choice between Estacionar (Park) or Remar (Row). In Estacionar, teams had to swim out into the ocean to reach three paddleboats floating out there. They had to bring these three boats back to a parking location on the beach to receive their next clue. In Remar, teams got into a kayak and had to zigzag around floating buoys until they reached a marked one, then return to shore. Teams had to do this three times to receive their next clue.

In this leg's Roadblock, one team member had to stay upright on a wakeboard being towed by a speedboat for a full minute to receive their next clue.

Additional task

- After passing the U-Turn, teams then had to use a local vehicle known as a carricoche to reach Chipipe Beach. There, teams would find a Samsung Galaxy S5 that instructed them to utilize a large slingshot to launch melons at two towers of plastic buckets, knocking them all down to receive their next clue.

=== Leg 11 (Santa Elena) ===
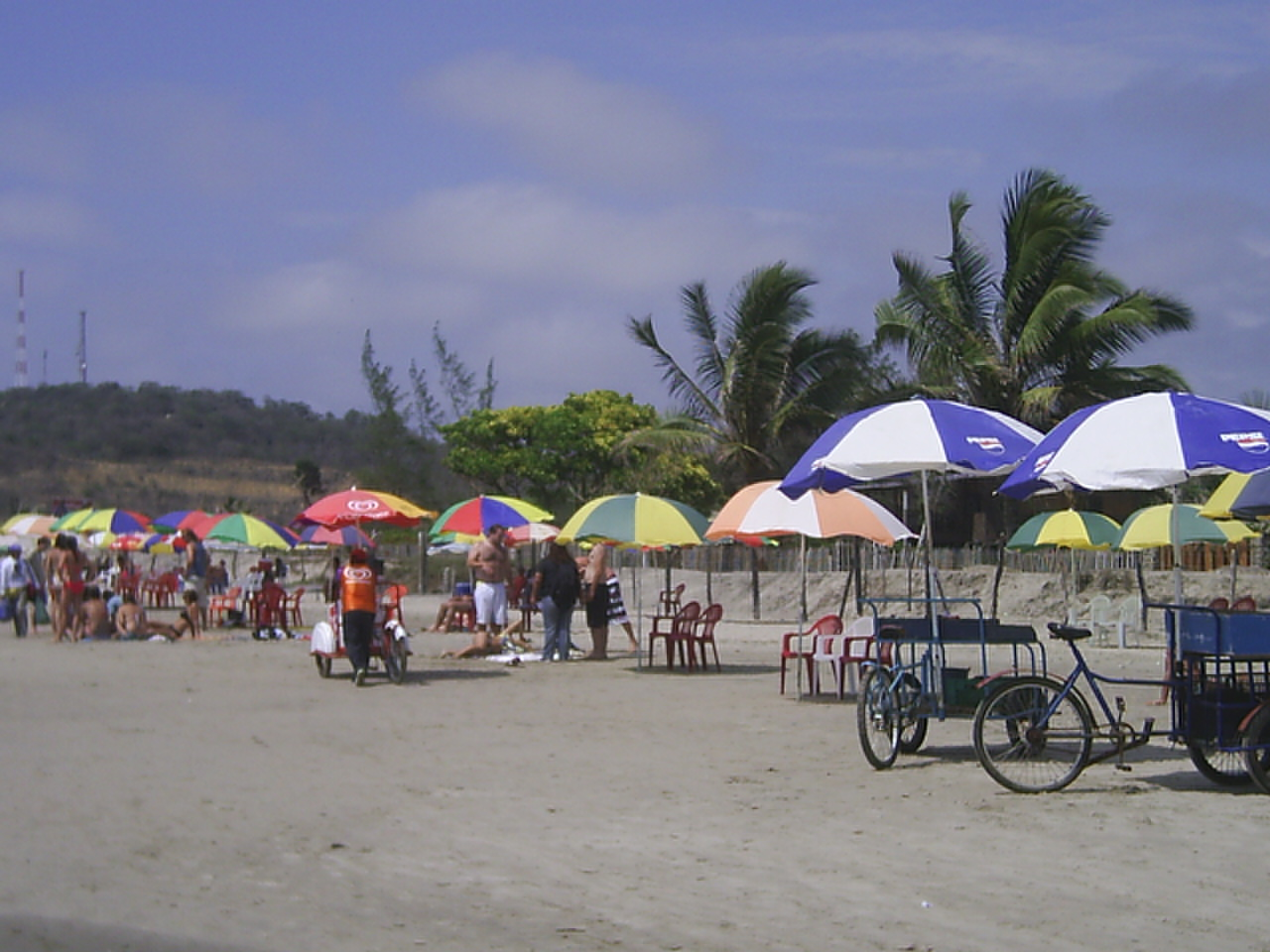
For the eleventh leg, teams visited the beach town of Montañita.

Airdate: December 15, 2014

- Santa Elena (Terminal Terrestre) to Montañita
- Montañita (Malecon)
- Montañita (Caña Grill or Nativa Bambú Nightclub)
- Montañita (Balsa Surf Camp Hotel) (Overnight Rest)
- Ayangue (Ayangue Beach)
- Olón (Malecon)
- Olón (Olón Beach)

This leg's Detour was a choice between Bartender or Disco Dancer. In Bartender, teams had to find the Caña Grill where they had to stack seven cocktail glasses into a pyramid, and then use a stack of mixing glasses to pour red and yellow colorful cocktails into each glass simultaneously. This had to be done in such a way that none of the cocktails mixed to receive their next clue. In Disco Dancer, teams had to find Nativa Bambú, where they had to learn from an instructor a series of dance moves. When performing for the judges, teams had to spin a wheel to determine what outfit they had to wear while dancing. If they could perform the dance correctly and score at least 12 points with the judges, they would receive their next clue.

In this leg's Roadblock, one team member had to wade out to a boat, offload all of the items on it without getting any of them wet and then finally offload a real person to receive their next clue.

Additional tasks

- At the start of the leg, teams traveled by bus to Montanita and had to find their next clue next to the surfboards on the Malecon. They then had to search the streets next to the Malecon for a surfer, who had their next clue.
- After the Detour, teams would then sign up for departure times for the next morning at the Balsa Surf Camp Hotel.
- At Malecon of Olón, teams had to cross the beach on stilts in order to step on the Pit Stop mat at Olón Beach.

=== Leg 12 (Santa Elena → Manabí) ===
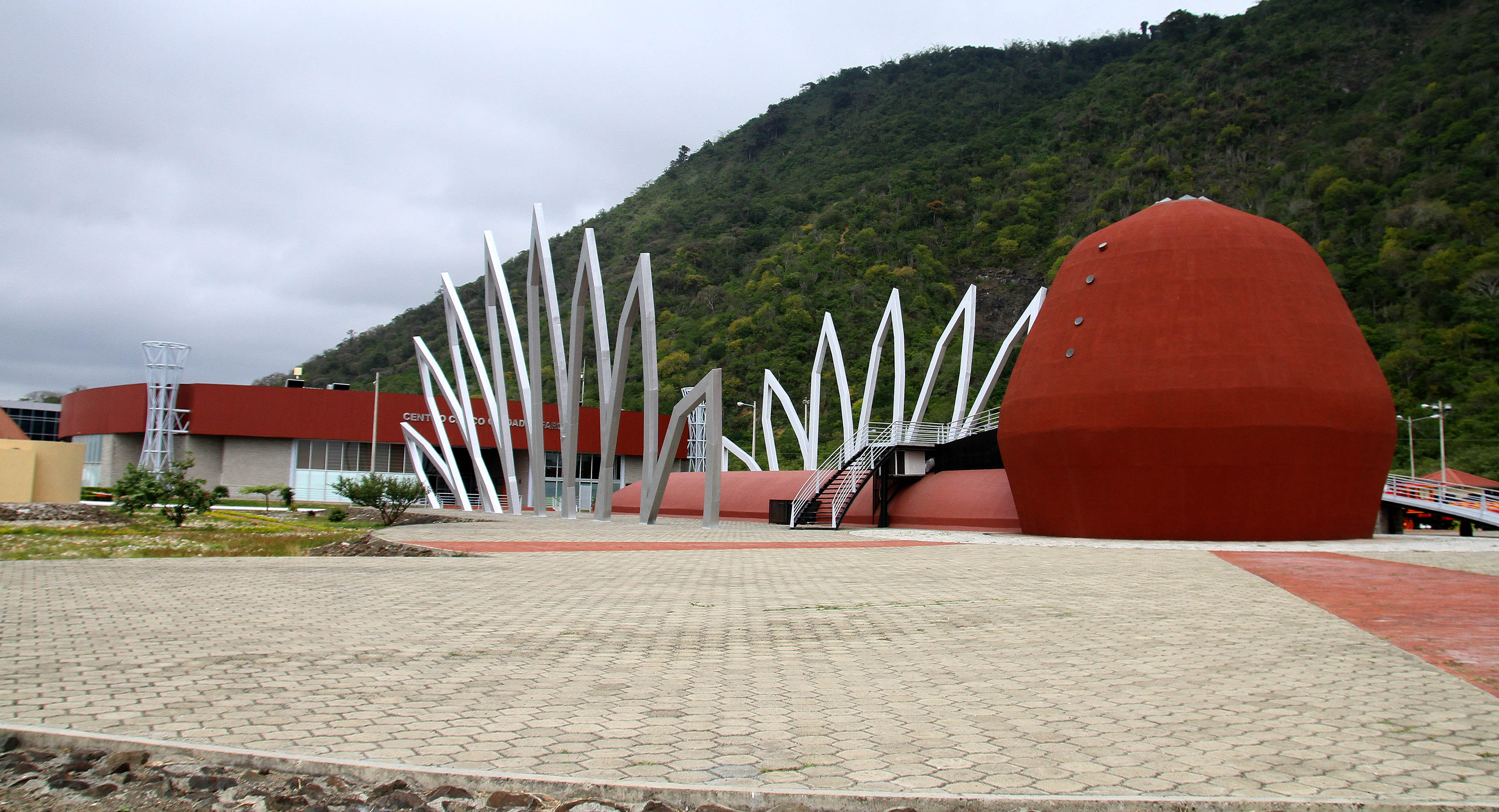
Teams ended the penultimate leg at Ciudad Alfaro in Montecristi.

Airdate: December 22, 2014

- Montañita to Manta, Manabí Province (Terminal Terrestre)
- Manta (Hotel Oro Verde) (Overnight Rest)
- Manta (San Mateo Port)
- Jaramijó (Jaramijó Naval Base)
- Jaramijó (Policía Nacional GIR Station)
- Montecristi (Basílica Menor de la Virgin de Montserrat)
- Montecristi (Ciudad Alfaro)

This season's final Detour was a choice between Bote (Boat) or Stand Up Paddle. In Boat, teams had to paddle a boat around the port, searching for the many boats that would give them a certain amount of fish. Once they had all 30 available fish, they would receive their next clue. In Stand Up Paddle, teams had to use a stand-up paddle board to make their way to many buoys, looking for ones that had puzzle pieces on them. Whenever they found one, they had to return it to shore before looking for another one. Once they had them all, they could piece together the puzzle to see their next clue.

In this leg's Roadblock, one team member would ride in a military vehicle to the base's beach, then had to put on a backpack filled with a large amount of provisions and swim out to a buoy in the water. After circling it and returning to shore, teams found their next clue inside the backpack somewhere. Unknown to them was that they first had to prove themselves to the military trainers by dunking themselves in the water, rolling in the wet sand, and performing warm-up exercises. They would also have to use their breath to inflate their own life preserver.

Additional tasks

- At the Hotel Oro Verde, teams had to sign up for departure times in the morning. The next morning, teams would get their next clue at the hotel's bar.
- At the Policía Nacional GIR Station, teams had to complete a grueling pentathlon course that was designed to train police officers. Once they completed the course, an officer will give teams their next clue.
- At the church at Montecristi, each team member would have to put a stack of 13 toquillla hats on their heads. They had to keep these hats balanced on their heads while they traveled on foot to Ciudad Alfaro, a nearby location. They also had to activate the Samsung watch's pedometer function. At the end of the task is Ciudad Alfaro, which was the Pit Stop.

=== Leg 13 (Manabí → Guayas) ===
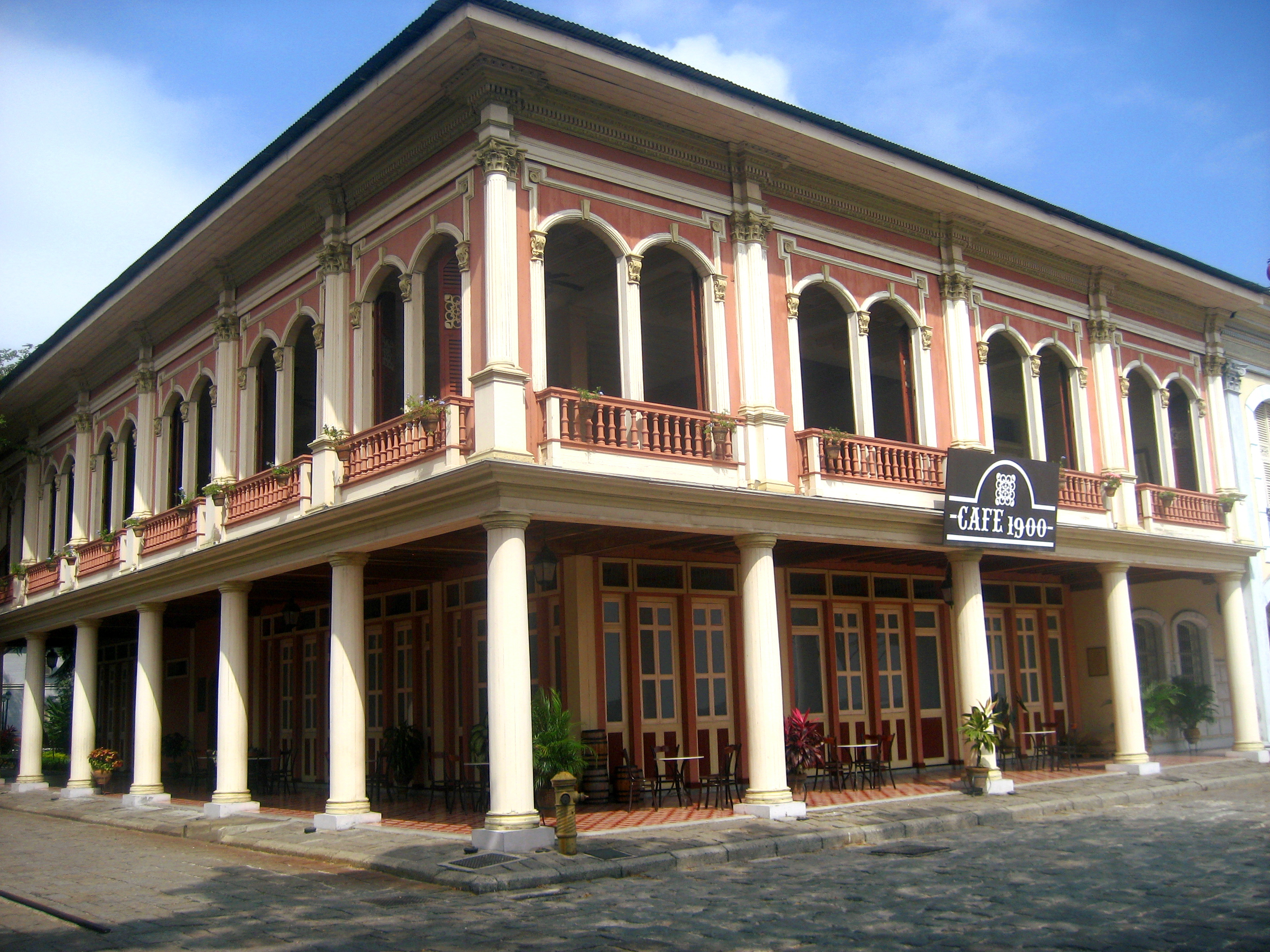
For the final leg in Guayaquil, teams crossed the Finish Line at Parque Histórico de Guayaquil in Samborondón.

Airdate: December 29, 2014

- Manta to Guayaquil, Guayas Province (Terminals Terrestres)
- Guayaquil (Pilsener Plaza)
- Guayaquil (Casa Pilsener Restaurant)
- Guayaquil (TC Channel Building)
- Samborondón (Sanchez Aguilar Theatre (in Spanish))
- Samborondón (Parque Histórico de Guayaquil (in Spanish))

In this season's final Roadblock, one team member had to complete a difficult physical challenge course from Calle 7 Ecuador. They had to build a bridge over a pool with a limited number of planks, transport three blocks over it, and climb up these blocks to retrieve a flag. They then had to climb to the top of an angled rope to retrieve another flag. Next, they had to lift up a very heavy canister and untangle it from a rope wrapped through a maze of wood. Then, they had to stand on a tiny platform and use a long chain to hook a tiny pail. Finally, they would ring a bell at the end of the course to receive their next clue.

Additional tasks

- Upon arrival in Guayaquil, teams had to find a trio of guitar players at the Pilsener Plaza. However, the guitar players would sing them a song about how they would get their next clue tomorrow at 11:00 a.m.
- At the Casa Pilsner restaurant, teams would have to correctly count the value of a large amount of poker chips ($80,650) to receive their next clue from the dealer.
- At Sanchez Aguilar Theatre, teams had to search the many seats in the building for a small ticket. This would give them entry into the Zaruma hall, where teams would complete the final memory challenge. Teams were given a selection of 54 people, 12 of which were the greeters that welcomed them to the Pit Stops and had to use 12 Samsung Tablets to pick the greeters and place them in the order they appeared during the season to receive their final clue.
