= Surfing in Ecuador =

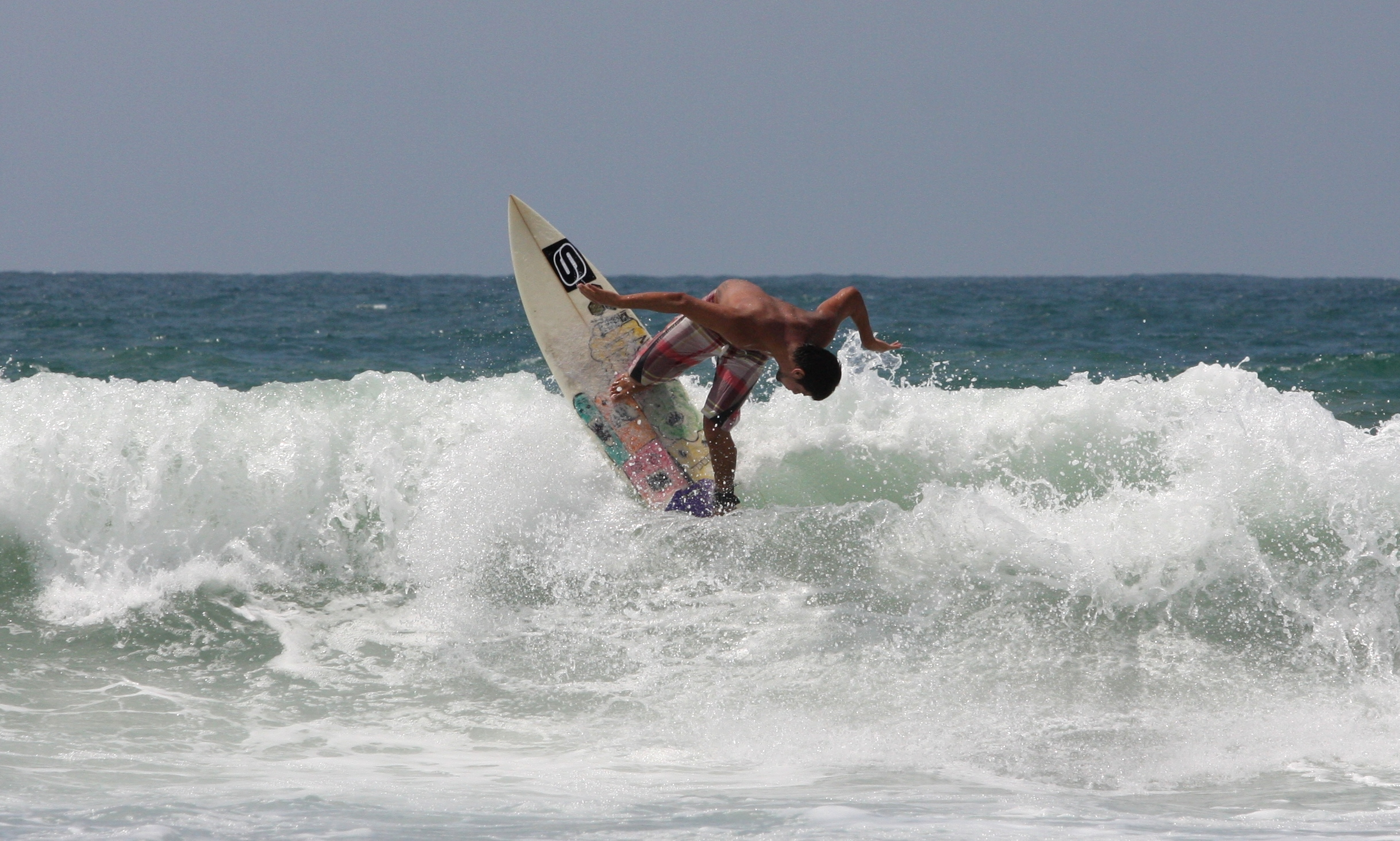
Surfing the Punta Carnero Beach in Ecuador

Ecuador has many beaches for surfing: the coast of Ecuador is 2,237 km (1,390 miles) long. Surfable waves are available in Ecuador year-round, and surfers enjoy the mild year-round weather, especially in the northern region where the weather conditions attract many surfers from all over the world. Within this part of South America, Ecuador's neighbors Chile and Peru also offer great surfing. Many surfers in Ecuador use a protective wetsuit. Surf tourism is very important to the local economy, and the beaches offer significant enjoyment because of top quality waves combined with affordable prices for lodging and food compared to other surf destinations. There's also a national marine reserve off the coast, which has a gigantic whale population.

== Surfing locations ==
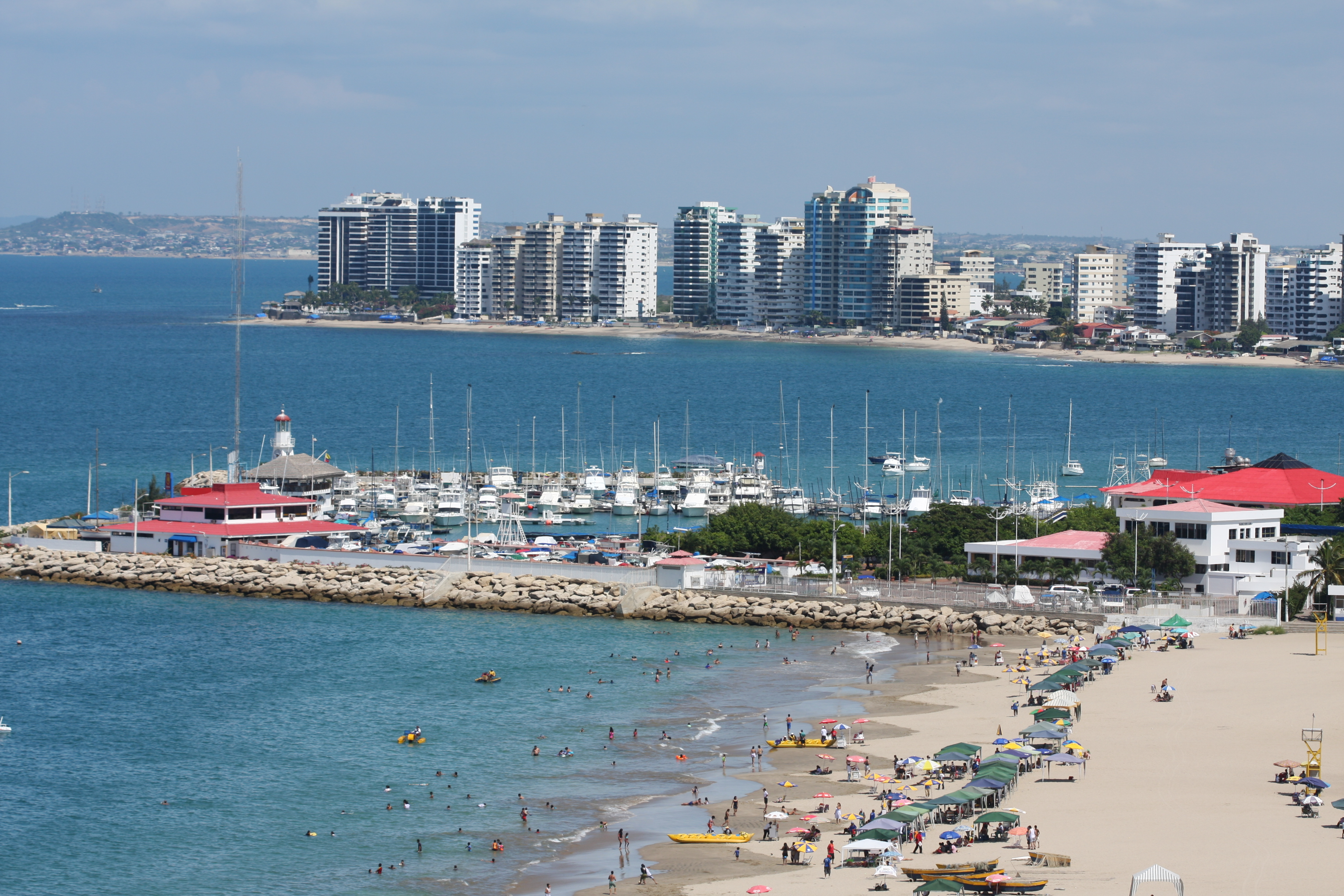
Salinas surfing beach: daytime photo of the Pacific Ocean

Location of Ecuador

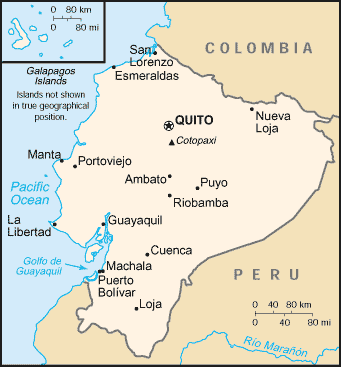
Ecuador country map

Some of the most popular surfing spots in Ecuador, which also have links to their own Wikipedia pages, include:

- Atacames - A beach town located on Ecuador's Northern Pacific coast.
- Canoa - A 10-mile beach break, no rocks, no reef, no riptide. The perfect beach break for beginners year round and challenging surf swells in peak season from January through April.
- Galápagos Islands - The Galapagos are an area of volcanic islands distributed around the equator in the Pacific Ocean and are 500 miles from the mainland coast of Ecuador mainland. San Cristobal is a favorite spot in the Galapagos for surfing, where the surf is from both the North and South Pacific, and the “surf season” is from December until May. However, people surf all year round in the Galapagos & Ecuador.
- Manta made a name for itself in the surfing world in 2004 by hosting the Bodyboarding World Cup.
- Montañita is one of the better spots to surf with waves in the months between January and March are as large as 2 meters.
- Playas is a coastal city located in the province of Guayas, Ecuador.
- Punta Carnero - is a popular surfing location, and the beach been chosen many times for national and international surf competitions.
- Salinas was the site of the ISA World Junior Surfing Games Ecuador in 2009.
Additional Ecuadoran beaches

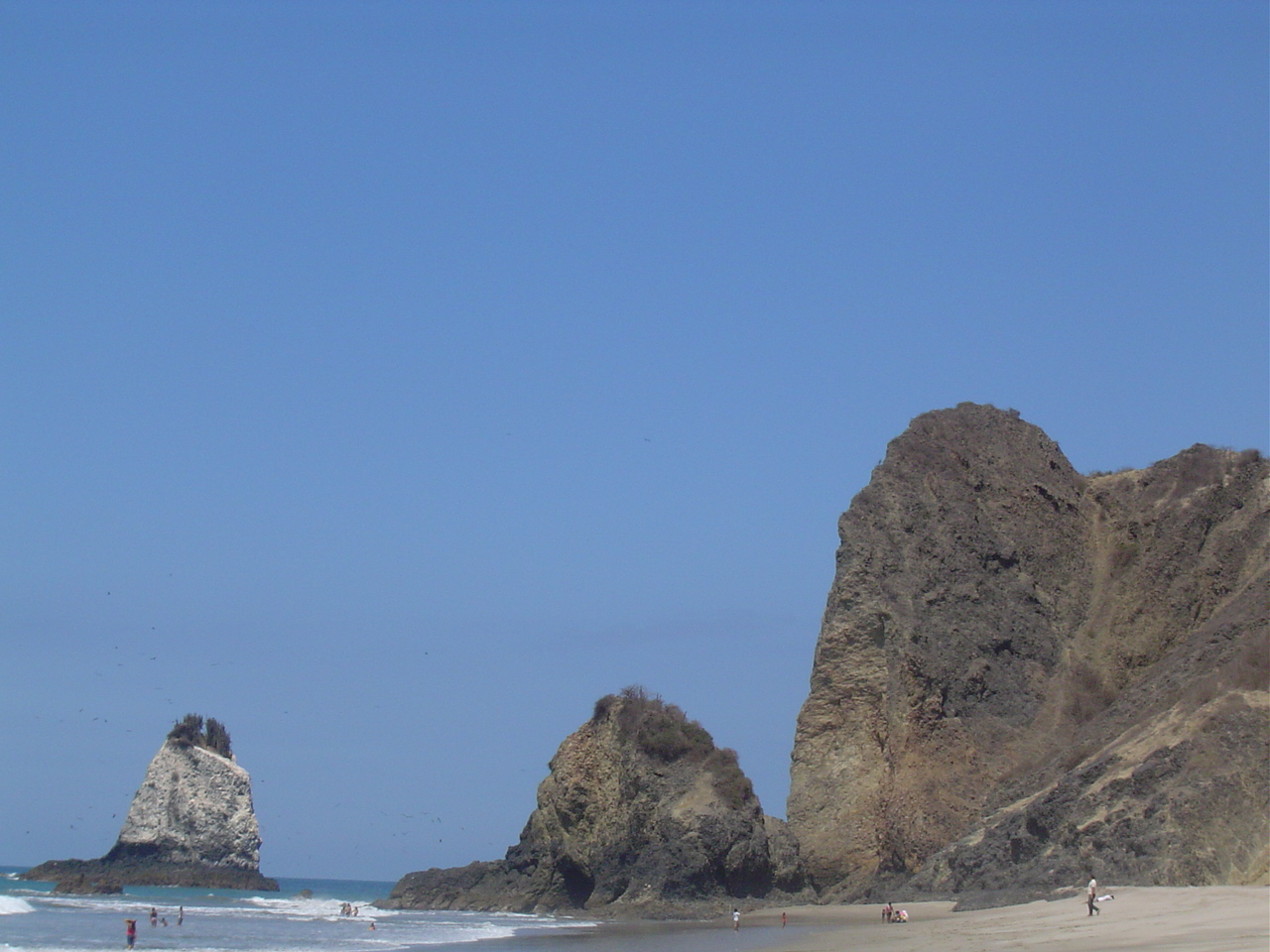
A beach in Manta, Ecuador

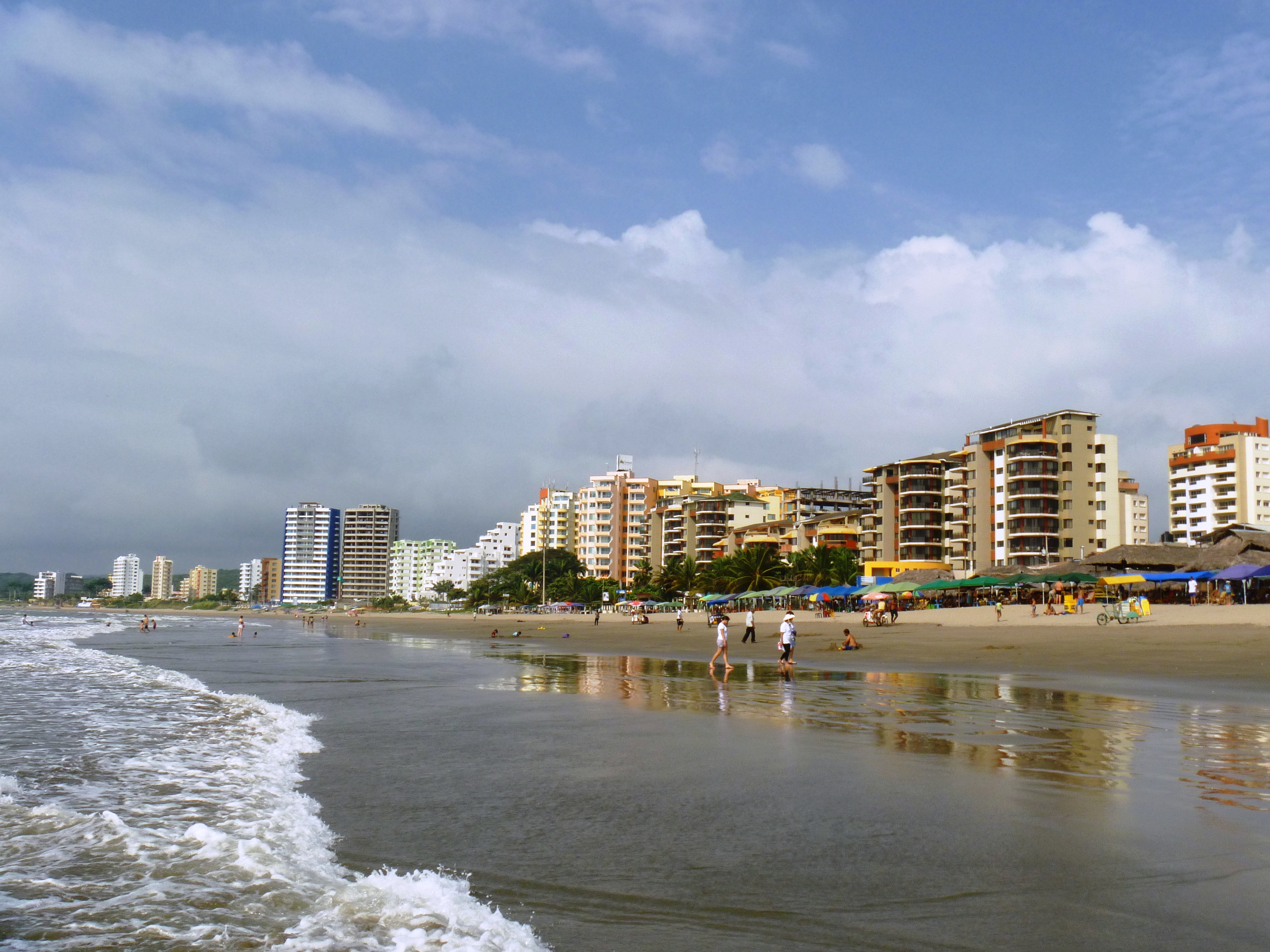
Skyline of the beach line in Tonsupa, Atacames

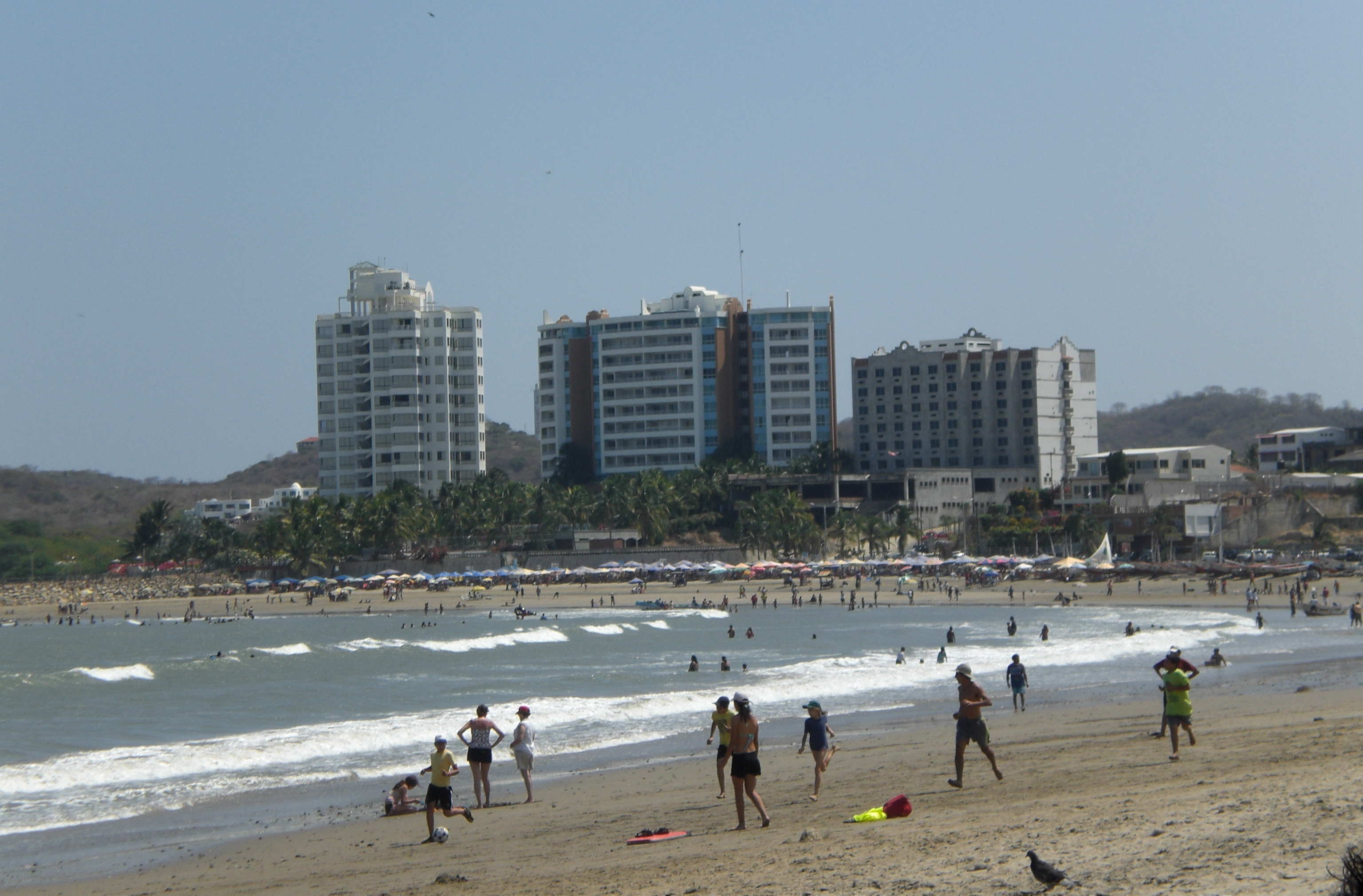
Playas at the Beach in Ecuador

== See also ==
- Bodyboarding
- Index of surfing articles
- List of surfing events
