= Punta Carnero, Ecuador =

Surfing beach in Ecuador

Coordinates: 2°16′44″S 80°55′8.4″W

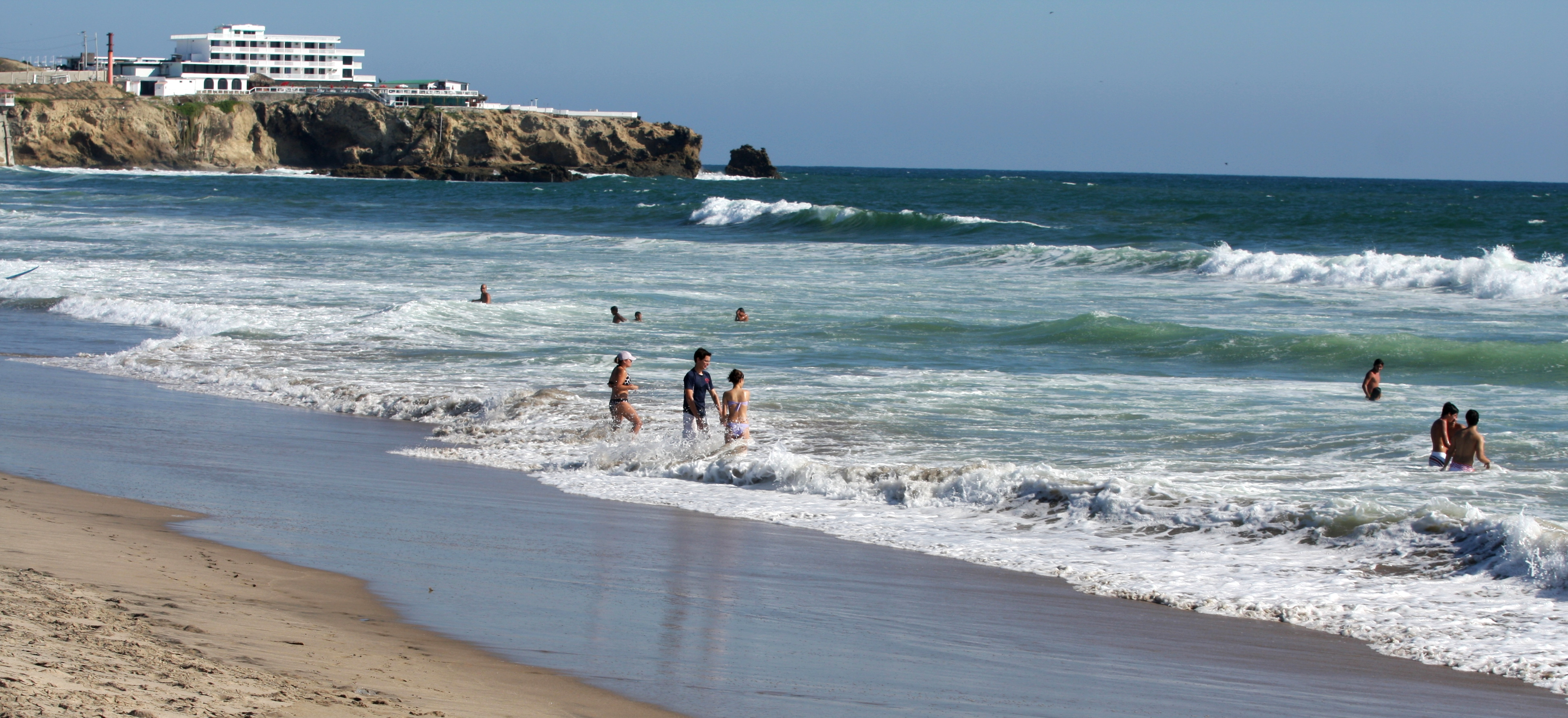
The beach in Punta Carneros Ecuador

Punta Carneros is a beach located in the Salinas County, in the Santa Elena Province of Ecuador.

== Punta Carneros Beach ==
Punta Carneros Beach is surrounded by thick coastal vegetation. The beach extends for approximately 1.6 miles (2.57 kilometers) with white to gray sand.

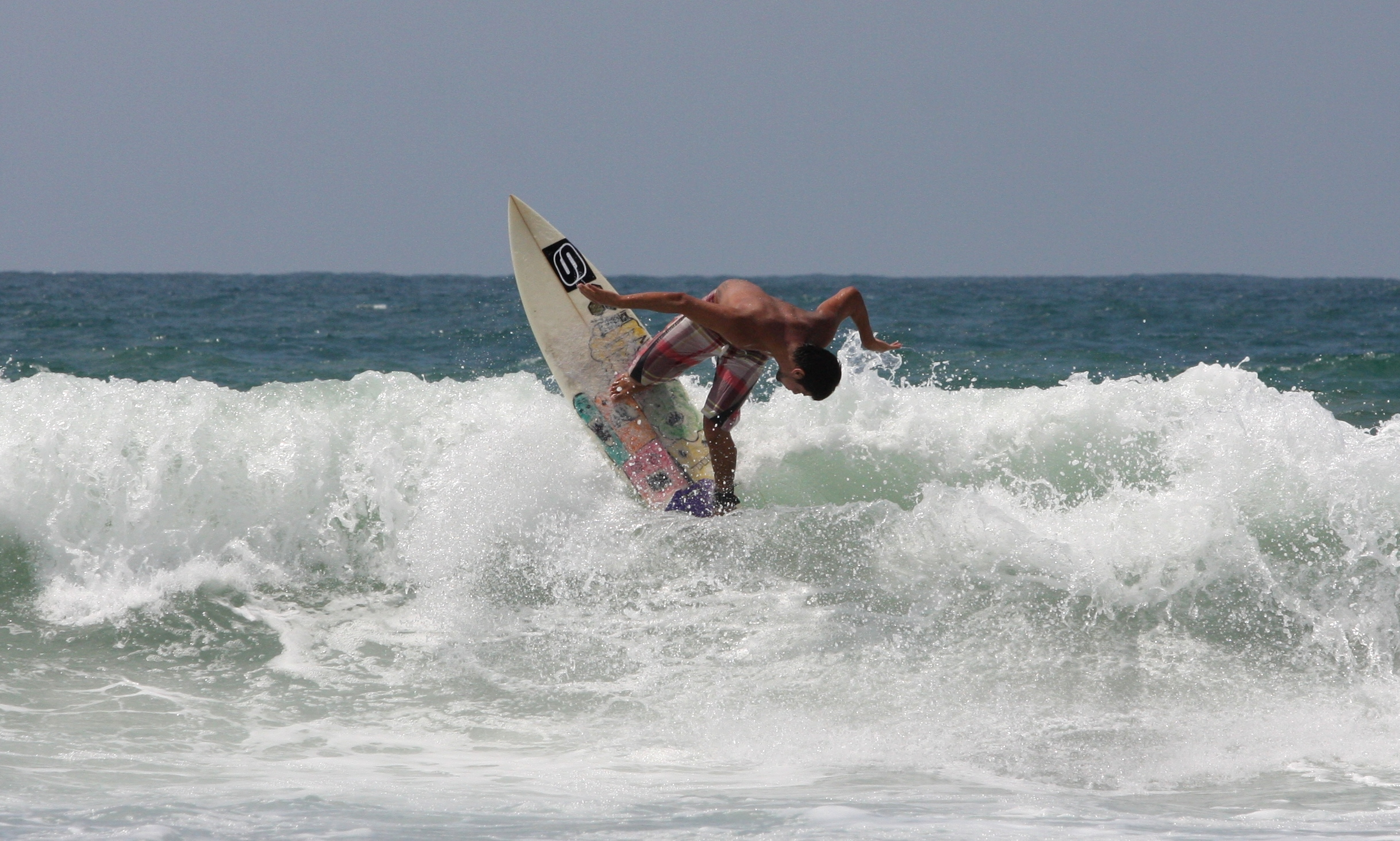
Surfing the Punta Carnero Beach in Ecuador

== Recreational activities ==
Surfing is a popular activity at Punta Carneros Beach due to the quality of the surf from the rocks to the dock. The beach is known for having hosted national and international surfing competitions numerous times. The beach was the venue for the ISA World Junior Surfing Games Ecuador in 2009.

Other common recreational activities in the beach include whale watching, parasailing and birdwatching.
