= Calle 7 Ecuador =

Ecuadoran Television Game Show

- Starring: Ronald Farina; Jaime Arellano; Lissette Cedeño
- Country of origin: Ecuador

Production
- Running time: 120 minutes 120 minutes (telecast)

Original release
- Network: TC Televisión
- Release: November 5, 2012

Calle 7 Ecuador was an Ecuadoran television program, shown by TC Televisión from Monday to Friday at 6 pm. It was last co-hosted by Ronald Farina and Jaime Arellano, and involved two teams of young adult contenders participating in unique challenges and performing arts to win a top prize at the end of the competition.

== Seasons ==
| | Premiere | Finale | Winner | Runner-up | Number of contestants | Spirit of Calle 7 |
|---|---|---|---|---|---|---|
| Season One | November 5, 2012 | March 1, 2013 | Karin Barreiro; Ricardo Delgado | Yulia Mamonova; Antonio Abril | 21 | Yulia Mamonova; Antonio Abril |
| Season Two | March 4, 2013 | August 16, 2013 | Karin Barreiro; Alex Paredes | Isabel Mestanza; Mario Vélez | 21 | Nicol Cordova; Mario Vélez |
| Season Three | August 19, 2013 | January 4, 2014 | Paola López; Alex Paredes | Isabel Mestanza; Andrés Gil | 21 | Karin Barreiro; Emiliano Yanezeli |
| Season Four | January 13, 2014 | April 25, 2014 | Dina Muñoz; Stefano Navas | Fernanda Gallardo; Jorge Santos | 20 | Dina Muñoz; Christian Altamirano |
| Season Five | April 28, 2014 | September 19, 2014 | Dina Muñoz; Alex Paredes | Mayra Jaime; Stefano Navas | 28 | Fernanda Gallardo; Mario Vélez |
| Season Six | September 22, 2014 | February 27, 2015 | Julissa Jiménez; Douglas Lascano | Dina Muñoz; Stefano Navas | 23 | Dina Muñoz; Stefano Navas |
| Season Seven | March 2, 2015 | July 17, 2015 | Julissa Jiménez; Douglas Lascano | Josdy González; Alex Paredes | 21 | |
