= Atacames =

- Town
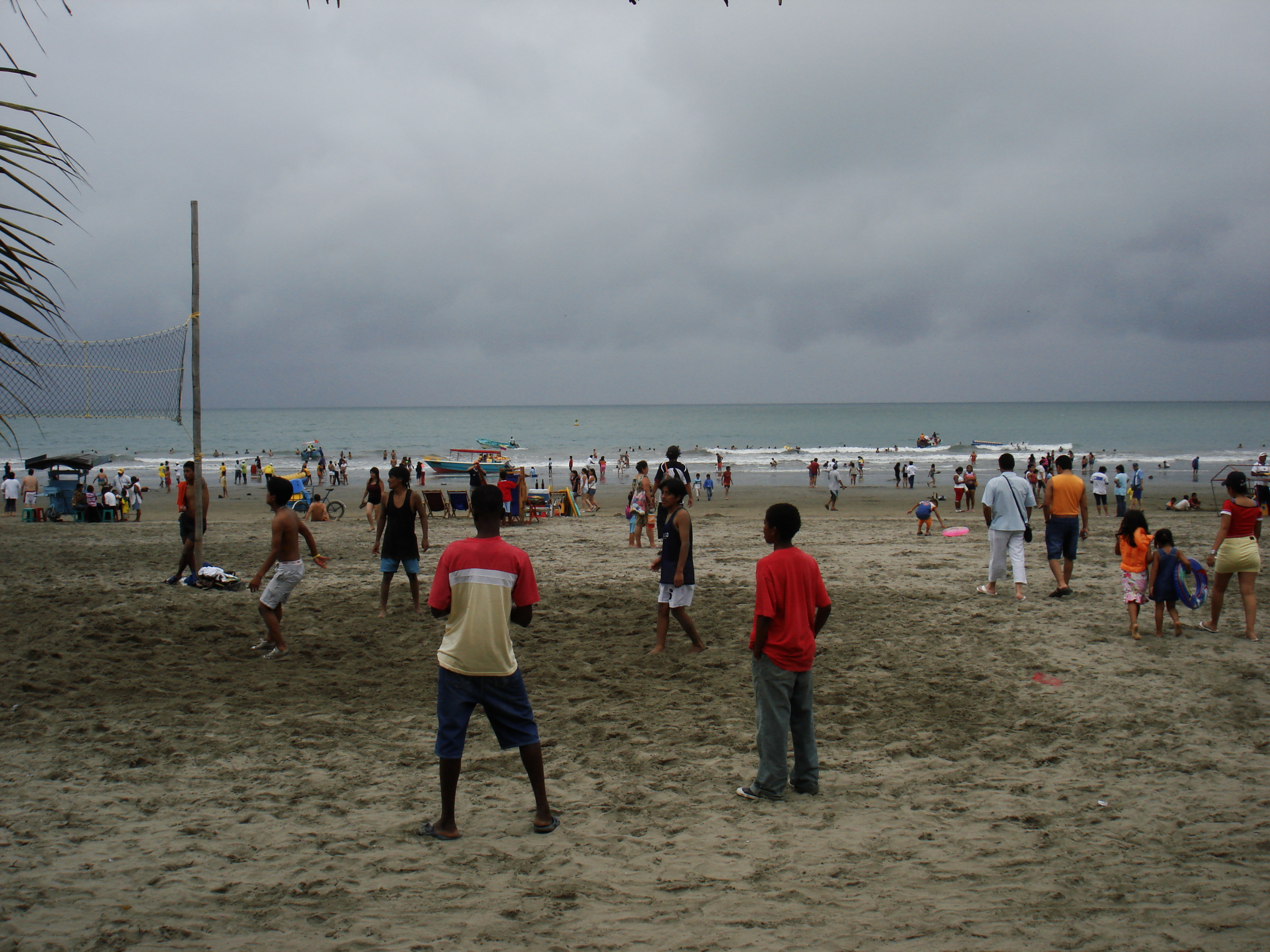
- Atacames Beach

- Location within Ecuador
- Coordinates: 0.87002°N 79.84879°W
- Country: Ecuador
- Province: Esmeraldas
- Canton: Atacames Canton

Area
  - Total: 4.8 km^{2} (1.9 sq mi)

Population (2022 census)
  - Total: 18,948
  - Density: 3,900/km^{2} (10,000/sq mi)

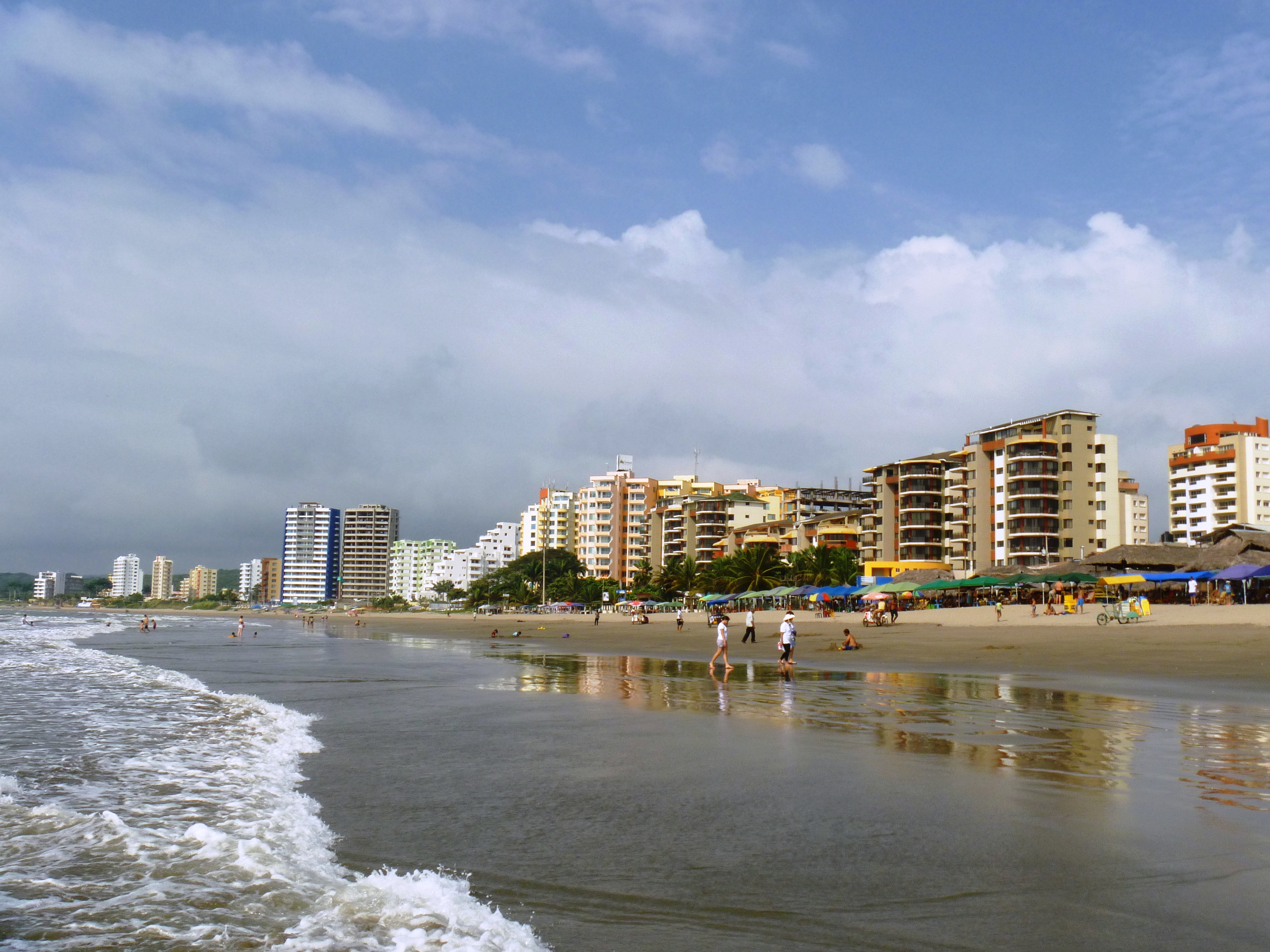
Skyline of the beach line in Tonsupa, Atacames

Atacames is a beach town and surround canton located on Ecuador's Northern Pacific coast. It is located in the province of Esmeraldas, approximately 30 kilometers south west from the capital of that province, which is also called Esmeraldas. In 2022 Atacames town had a population of 18,948, while the canton had 51,204 (in the 2022 census). Atacames has one of the lowest rates of poverty in the province of Esmeraldas (68% in 2005).

During Francisco Pizarro's second conquest in 1526, he landed at Atacames. There he was unable to conquer or invade the land due to the resistance that he found in the local people who were at that time under the Incas.

In the centuries after Spanish conquest, some slave ships came from Africa. In 1553 a ship carrying slaves from Panama to Peru was stranded on Esmeralda, and the 25 slaves on board managed to escape from their captors. In the following years more escaped slaves, along with the descendants of the former slaves, developed some of the lands along the coast. Although there were also other people groups present in Atacames in the 16th century, today Afro-Ecuadoreans make up a large portion of the population in Atacames.

Tourism is Atacames's primary industry. For its population, Atacames has the highest level of hotels in the whole province of Esmeraldas. It is also easily accessible by bus from Santo Domingo, Quito, and Esmeraldas.

== Demographics ==
Atacames Canton
- Canton
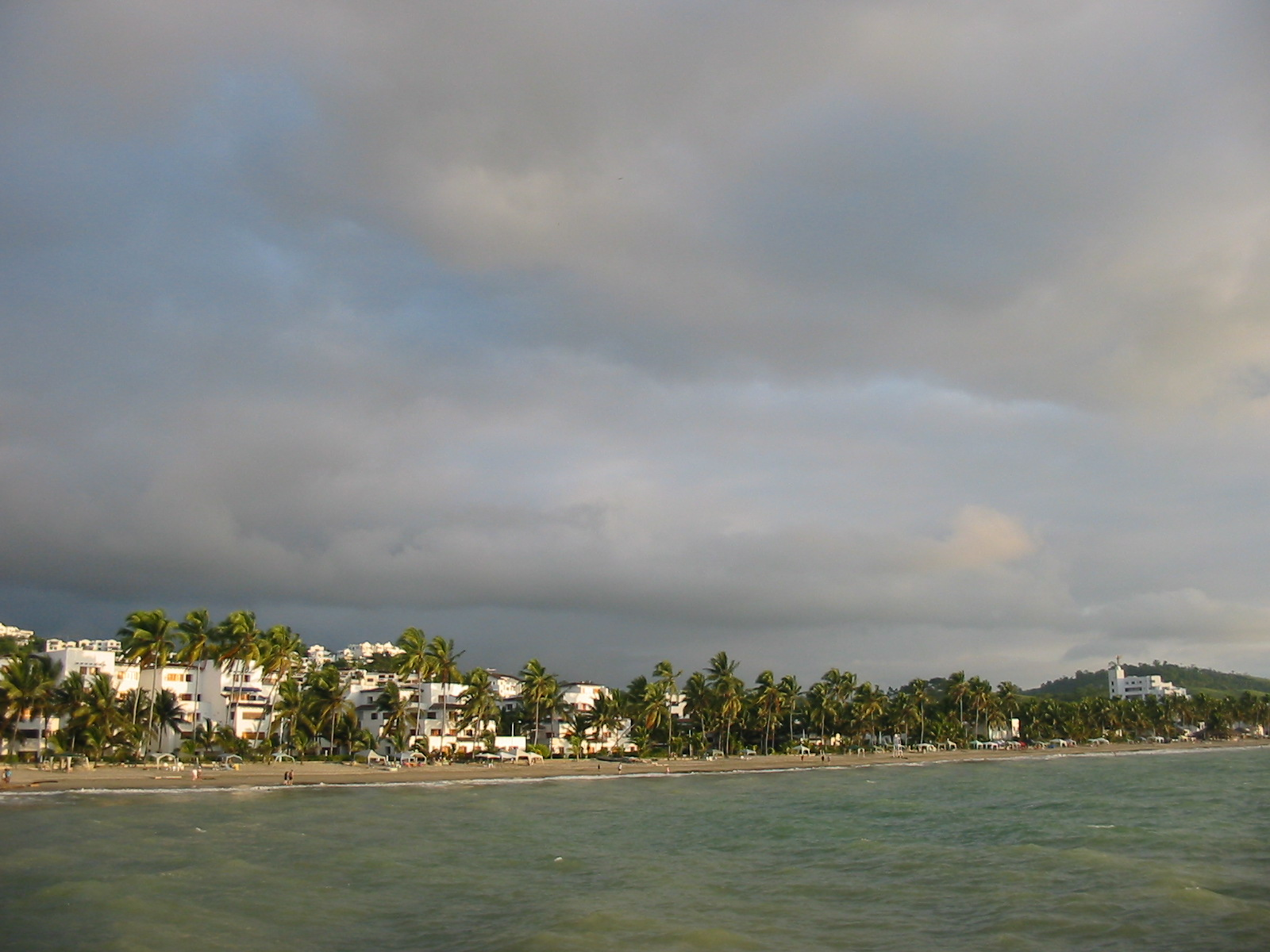
- Same, located at the Pacific Ocean in Canton Atacames

- Location of Esmeraldas Province in Ecuador.

- Atacames Canton in Esmeraldas Province
- Coordinates: 0°52′N 79°50′W
- Country: Ecuador
- Province: Esmeraldas Province
- Seat: Atacames

Area
  - Total: 510.5 km^{2} (197.1 sq mi)

Population (2022 census)
  - Total: 51,204
  - Density: 100.3/km^{2} (259.8/sq mi)
- Time zone: UTC-5 (ECT)

Ethnic groups in the canton as of the Ecuadorian census of 2010:

- Mestizo 55.0%
- Afro-Ecuadorian 34.2%
- White 7.9%
- Montubio 2.1%
- Indigenous 0.4%
- Other 0.4%

== Surfing in Atacames & Ecuador ==
People travel from all over the world to enjoy Surfing in Ecuador. Salinas, Ecuador, was the site of the ISA World Junior Surfing Games Ecuador in 2009.

== Cuisine ==
The food served in Atacames is typical for much of the coastal regions of Ecuador. Meals will often consist of shrimp, crab, lobster, and fish. Several of the citizens in Atacames fish, and thus much of the food that is served is fresh. In Atacames you can typically find delicious ceviches, encocados and all sorts of seafood and, as is typical in most of Ecuador, rice is generally served with the meal. A wide variety of fruit juices are also served, though beer (particularly Pilsener), water, and carbonated beverages are also common. Vegetables, which are generally grown in the highlands of Ecuador, are often missing from the regular diet due to their higher price.

== Transportation in Atacames ==
Although only a small town, Atacames has several taxi services. Only one of these actually involves vehicular transport as the rest of the taxi services rely on bikes that are either gas or manually powered.

== Bibliography ==
- www.inec.gov.ec (Spanish)
