= Montañita =

- Town
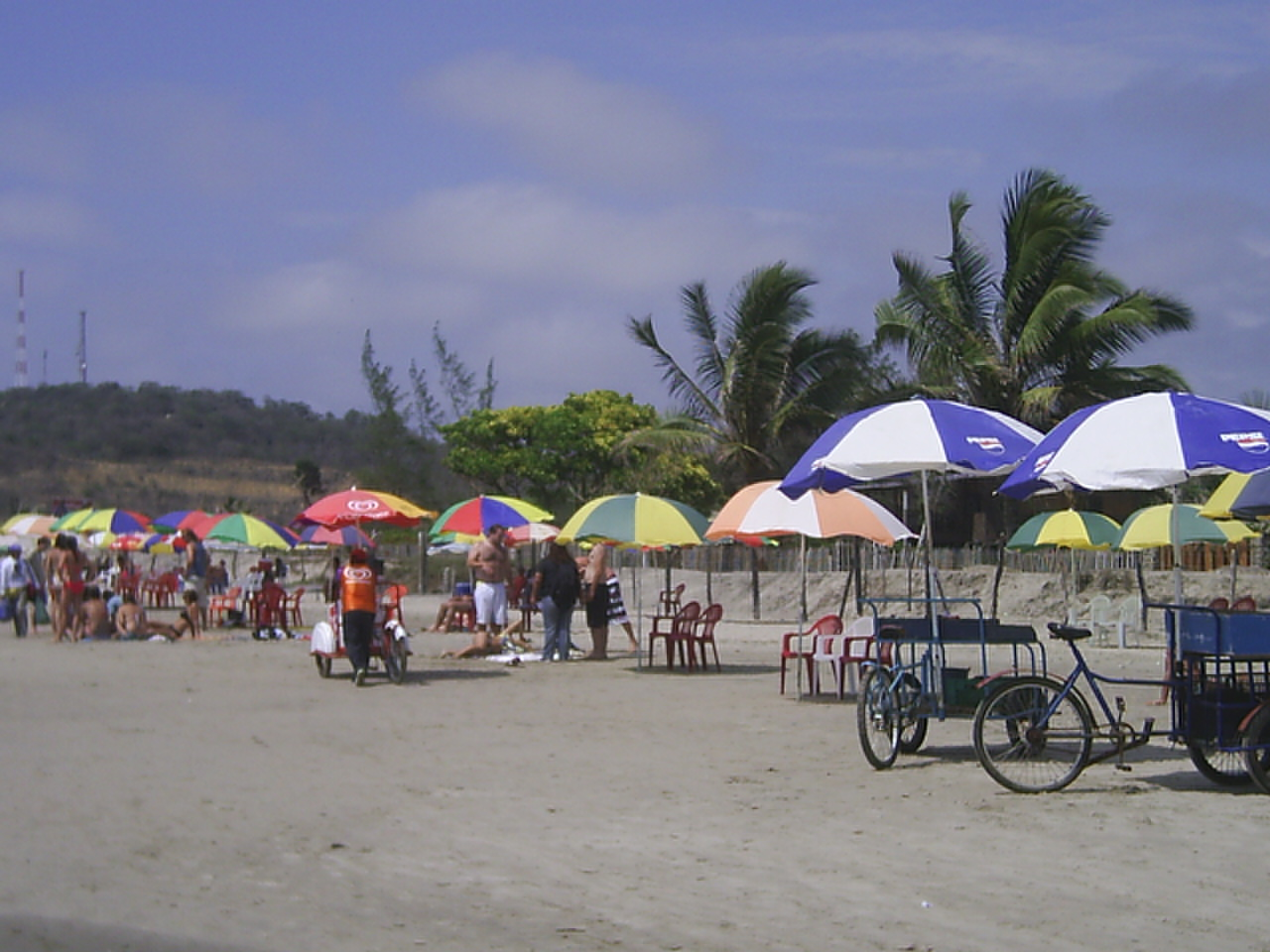
- Montañita Beach
- Motto(s): Lo que pasa en Montanita, se queda en Montanita
- Location within Ecuador
- Coordinates: 1°50′0″S 80°45′0″W
- Country: Ecuador
- Province: Santa Elena
- Canton: Santa Elena
- Parishes: List of urban parishes

Population
  - Total: 1,000
- Time zone: UTC-5 (ECT)
- Climate: BWh

Montañita is a small coastal town in Ecuador located in the parish of Manglaralto, province of Santa Elena, about 180 kilometers northwest of Guayaquil. Its name means "small mountain." In the mid 20th century it was known as a surfing beach, with only a few fishermen's huts, and one or two surfers tents in summer, erected at the site. But in 1960, Montañita, foreigners linked to the hippie movement decided to settle there permanently. It is now a popular destination for surfers from around the world and considered one of the best surfing beaches in Ecuador's south coast.

== Characteristics ==
The town of Montañita is laid out in a grid of small streets crowded with shops and restaurants. Most of the east/west roads have beach access. The town has four main areas: the beach, the Point, Trigrillo neighborhood and the Center. The Point is the small mountain, that separates Montañita's beach from that of the neighboring town of Olon. The first cement beach house in the town, constructed by two foreigners Jack and James who had formerly been camping on the beach, is a notable feature of the town.

== Climate ==
Montañita's climate is that of a tropical, coastal city. Its average temperature is 28°C (82°F), and the rainy season runs from December to May. However, rainfall is low and typically occurs in the evening or night. Water temperatures range from 13-20°C (56-68°F).

The town was severely affected by the 1997–98 El Niño phenomenon, which caused widespread flooding, landslides, and loss of life along Ecuador's Pacific coast. Santa Elena province, where Montañita is located, was among the areas hit hardest, with relief organizations distributing emergency food and medical aid to the canton in the disaster's aftermath.

== Economy ==
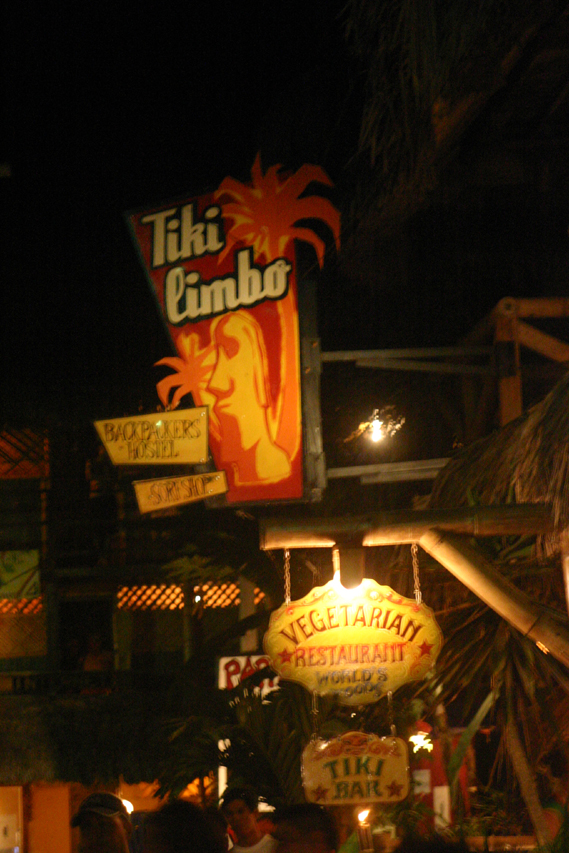
Tikilimbo, a hostel in Montañita

Montañita's economy is dependent on tourism, especially food service, surfing, and craft sales. Besides surfing, tourists and locals come to engage in bodyboarding, scuba diving, and windsurfing. The tourist season peaks in January and hits its low in June. Each February, Carnival is held in Montañita.

== Valdivia archaeological site ==
About 10km south of Montanita is located the Valdivia archaeological site. The excavations here back in the 1950s revealed the existence of now famous Valdivia culture, one of the oldest ancient cultures in South America. The coordinates of the Valdivia archaeological site are 1°56'29"S and 80°41'51"W.

There are several other archeological sites on the Santa Elena Peninsula south of Montanita, including Santa Elena, Ecuador. Excavations there revealed the evidence that this site belonged to the Las Vegas culture (archaeology), the first Ecuadorian culture which flourished from 8800 to 4600 BC along the Ecuadorian coast.

== Surfing in Montañita ==
Surfing in Montañita features consistent waves and tubular breaks that attract experienced surfers and can be challenging for beginners. Montañita has grown into an internationally recognized surfing destination, hosting competitions such as the 2013 ISA World Masters Surfing Championship and a 2021 World Surf League qualifying event. Wave heights generally range from 0.3 to 1 meter during the summer and can reach 1.5 meters in late autumn and winter. Between January and March, waves may reach heights of 2 meters. Montañita hosts an international surfing competition each February during Carnival.

== Curiosities ==
The main means of transportation are bicycles, pedicabs and the occasional truck, although the streets are mostly pedestrian. It is common to hear reggae music on street corners, and banners of peace symbols, or the portrait of Che Guevara, John Lennon or Bob Marley are common. Montañita has bars, restaurants, and cafés that cater to international tastes. During peak tourists season, there are many electronic/house music festivals on the beach. There are three schools that specialize in teaching Spanish. Montañita Spanish School was the first professional Spanish language school in town. Mar Azul with local experienced and certified teachers and La Escuelita offer customized private lessons. Montanita has a reputation of being a devils town but there is a myriad of other activities in which to take part.

On December 5, 2014 the movie Sexy Montañita, directed by Alberto Pablo Rivera, was released.

Montañita is widely known for its legal cannabis use due to an Ecuadorian law according to which individuals are allowed to carry a small "personal" amount of marijuana.
