= Zinia Pinto =

Zinia Teresa Carmen Pinto (Goa, 7 September 1929 – Karachi, 4 June 2013) was a Roman Catholic nun and teacher working in Karachi, Pakistan.

== Early life ==
She was born in 1929 in Portuguese Goa. After finishing high school in Goa, she completed a bachelor's degree in philosophy from St. Xavier's College, Mumbai and then trained as a teacher.

She came to Karachi in 1954 and joined St Joseph's Convent School as a teacher in July 1956. She taught English Language and Literature in classes 9 to 11. She left the school in December 1957 to start her religious education. She joined the Order of the Daughters of the Cross in 1958 and went to Belgium to complete her religious education.

== Career ==
Upon her return she joined the University of Karachi and was awarded a master's degree in psychology. She re-joined St Joseph's School and continued to teach there. She helped at St Joseph's College. She became the principal of the school on 1 June 1963 and continued in this position until 1999.

She served as the chairperson of the Karachi archdiocesan Catholic Board of Education. She mostly taught Religious Studies to classes 6 and 7. St Joseph's was one of the first schools to introduce computers during her tenure. In 2012, she was named Administrator of the school.

Pinto was Mother Superior of the Daughters of the Cross in Pakistan. A student donated 150 trees to be planted in the school and a special Neem tree in her name would mark her place in the school's history. She met with Pope John Paul II on 3 occasions and was present at the Mass he celebrated in Karachi on 16 February 1981.

== Death and legacy ==
She died on 4 June 2013 after being hospitalized at the Holy Family Hospital. Her funeral service took place on 6 June at Saint Patrick's Cathedral. She "steered the school through a period when nationalisation, denationalisation, privatisation and the commercialisation of schools ruined the structure of education in the country."
