= The Amazing Race en Discovery Channel 1 =

Season of television series

- Season 1
- The Amazing Race en Discovery Channel logo
- Presented by: Harris Whitbeck
- No. of teams: 11
- Winners: Matias Franchini & Tamara Reichelt
- No. of legs: 12
- Distance traveled: 14,600 km (9,100 mi)
- No. of episodes: 13

Release
- Original network: Discovery Latin America
- Original release: 20 September – 13 December 2009

Additional information
- Filming dates: 27 May – 18 June 2009

Series chronology
- Next → Season 2

The Amazing Race en Discovery Channel 1 is the first season of The Amazing Race en Discovery Channel, a Latin American reality competition show based on the American series The Amazing Race. Hosted by Harris Whitbeck, it featured eleven teams of two, each with a pre-existing relationship, in a race across Latin America to win US$250,000. The season was produced by RGB Entertainment. This season visited two continents and nine countries and traveled over 14,600 kilometres (9,100 mi) during twelve legs. Starting in Iguaçu National Park, racers traveled through Brazil, Argentina, Chile, Peru, Colombia, Panama, the Dominican Republic, Costa Rica, and Mexico before finishing in Mexico City. The Amazing Race en Discovery Channel premiered on Discovery Latin America on Sunday 20 September 2009 at 10:00 p.m. (UTC-5). The season finale was aired on 13 December 2009 at 10:00 p.m. (UTC-5).

Argentine married couple Matías Franchini and Tamara Reichelt were the winners of this season, while Venezuelan godfather and godson Daniel España and David Galavis finished in second place, and Chilean friends Ferna Guzmán and Fran Coombs finished in third place.

== Production ==
=== Development and filming ===
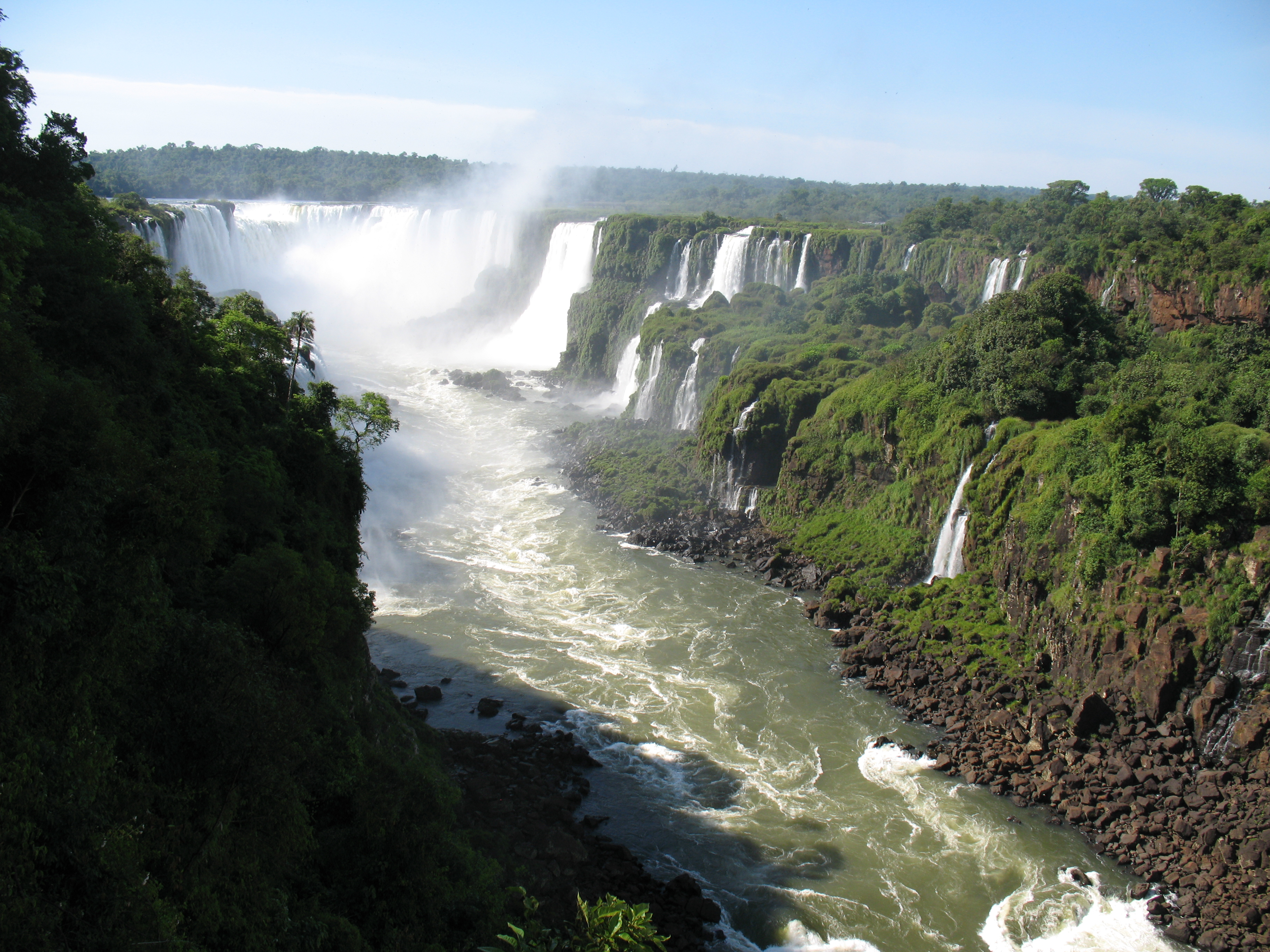
The Starting Line was at Iguaçu Falls in Iguaçu National Park, Brazil.

Discovery Channel greenlit the first installment in November 2008.

Filming lasted for 23 days and covered nearly 14,600 km (9,100 mi). The first season spanned nine countries in two continents. This season was the first-time any Amazing Race franchise outside of the original American version visited North America. Among the countries visited this season, 7 had been visited by the original American version, including Argentina, Brazil, Chile, Costa Rica, Mexico, Panama and Peru. At the time the season aired, Colombia and the Dominican Republic hadn't been visited by the American version, with Colombia later visited in the twenty-eighth season of the original American version in 2016.

The route markers in this season were colored blue and black, including the clue envelopes and the Pit Stop. Also different from other editions is the fact that the opening shows the teams' country of origin.

Only two teams, both of which were Mexican teams (Casilda & Casilda and Guillermo & Gabriel), appeared at the Finish Line in Mexico City.

=== Casting ===
Applications were accepted from 17 November 2008 to 31 January 2009.

=== Marketing ===
Visa, Palm Treo Pro and Nintendo were the sponsors of this season.

== Cast ==
This season counted with eleven teams from Argentina, Brazil, Chile, Colombia, Mexico, Panama and Venezuela. The cast includes the first team in the history of the franchise composed of a godfather and a godson, a homosexual dating couple, and a team of non-identical twins.

Contestants	Age	Relationship	Hometown	Status
Ariel Saravia	26	Siblings	Rosario, Argentina	Eliminated 1st (in Buenos Aires, Argentina)
Nora Saravia	33	Siblings	Rosario, Argentina	Eliminated 1st (in Buenos Aires, Argentina)
Guillermo Villarreal	33	Twins	Playa del Carmen, Mexico	Eliminated 2nd (in Aconcagua Provincial Park, Argentina)
Gabriel Villarreal	33	Twins	Playa del Carmen, Mexico	Eliminated 2nd (in Aconcagua Provincial Park, Argentina)
Ricardo Acevedo	60	Father & Daughter	Panama City, Panama	Eliminated 3rd (in Santiago, Chile)
Adriana Acevedo	26	Father & Daughter	Panama City, Panama	Eliminated 3rd (in Santiago, Chile)
Mario Torres	38	Dating	Bucaramanga, Colombia	Eliminated 4th (in Lima, Peru)
Melissa Figueredo	24	Dating	Bucaramanga, Colombia	Eliminated 4th (in Lima, Peru)
Miguel Kurmen	26	Boyfriends	Bogotá, Colombia	Eliminated 5th (in Bogotá, Colombia)
Diego Chaustre	28	Boyfriends	Bogotá, Colombia	Eliminated 5th (in Bogotá, Colombia)
Casilda Creixell	55	Mother & Daughter	Mexico City, Mexico	Eliminated 6th (in Cartagena, Colombia)
Casilda Pérez	30	Mother & Daughter	Mexico City, Mexico	Eliminated 6th (in Cartagena, Colombia)
Rodrigo Alegro	29	Dating Biologists	São Paulo, Brazil	Eliminated 7th (in Gamboa, Panama)
Anna Arestivo	28	Dating Biologists	São Paulo, Brazil	Eliminated 7th (in Gamboa, Panama)
Daniel Mastroiano	27	Friends	Araraquara, Brazil	Eliminated 8th (in Irazú Volcano National Park, Costa Rica)
Carlos Tavares	29	Friends	Araraquara, Brazil	Eliminated 8th (in Irazú Volcano National Park, Costa Rica)
Ferna Guzmán	28	Friends	Santiago, Chile	Third place
Fran Coombs	28	Friends	Santiago, Chile	Third place
Daniel España	55	Godfather & Godson	Caracas, Venezuela	Runners-up
David Galavis	23	Godfather & Godson	Caracas, Venezuela	Runners-up
Tamara Reichelt	29	Married	Buenos Aires, Argentina	Winners
Matías Franchini	35	Married	Buenos Aires, Argentina	Winners

== Results ==
The following teams are listed with their placements in each leg. Placements are listed in finishing order.

- A red placement with a dagger (†) indicates that the team was eliminated.
- An underlined blue placement with a double-dagger (‡) indicates that the team was the last to arrive at a Pit Stop in a non-elimination leg, and had to perform a Speed Bump in the following leg.
- An italicized placement indicates the team's placement at the midpoint of a double leg.
- A green ƒ indicates that the team won the Fast Forward.
- A brown > indicates that the team used the Yield and a brown < indicates the team on the receiving end of the Yield.
- A brown ⊃ indicates that the team used the U-Turn and a brown ⊂ indicates the team on the receiving end of the U-Turn.

Team placement (by leg)
Team	1	2	3	4	5	6	7	8	9	10	11	12a (Note: This was a double leg with two Detours and two Roadblocks shown over two episodes.)	12b
Matías & Tamara	1st	1st	2ndƒ	2nd	2nd	3rd	1st	2nd	4th	4th‡	3rd	3rd	1st
Daniel & David	2nd	10th	3rd	1st	3rd	6th	4th	3rd	3rd	2nd> (Note: Daniel & David chose to use the Yield on Ferna & Fran.) (Note: Daniel & David and Daniel & Carlos agreed to a 2nd place tie after both teams stepped on the Pit Stop mat at the same time.)	2nd	1st	2nd
Ferna & Fran	10th	3rd	9th	5th	5th	1st	2nd	1st	2nd⊃ (Note: Ferna & Fran chose to U-Turn Rodrigo & Anna.)	1st<	1st	2nd	3rd
Daniel & Carlos	5th	2nd	7th	4th	4th	2nd	5th	5th	1st	2nd	4th†		
Rodrigo & Anna	6th	8th	4th	6th	1st	4th	3rd	4th	5th†⊂				
Casilda & Casilda	3rd	6th	1st	3rd	6th	7th‡ (Note: Casilda & Casilda initially arrived 2nd, but were issued a 1-hour penalty for doing the incorrect option at the Detour. All of other teams checked in during this time, dropping Casilda & Casilda to last.)	6th	6th†					
Diego & Miguel	7th	5th	5th	8th	7th (Note: Diego & Miguel and Mario & Melissa were issued 1-hour penalties for not completing a task. Since they were the only two teams remaining to check in at that point, and since Diego & Miguel arrived at the Pit Stop before Mario & Melissa, Diego & Miguel had their penalty time assessed at the beginning of the next leg, while Mario & Melissa were eliminated.)	5th	7th†						
Mario & Melissa	8th	4th	8th	7th	8th†								
Ricardo & Adriana	4th	9th	6th	9th†									
Guillermo & Gabriel	9th	7th	10th†										
Nora & Ariel	11th‡	11th† (Note: Ariel & Nora initially arrived 3rd, but were issued a 4-hour penalty for not completing the Speed Bump. All of the other teams checked in during this time, dropping Ariel & Nora to last.)											

== Prizes ==
- Leg 1 – $200 credit card issued by Visa for each team member.
- Leg 2 – $200 credit card issued by Visa for each team member.
- Leg 3 – $300 credit card issued by Visa for each team member.
- Leg 4 – $300 credit card issued by Visa and a Nintendo DSi for each team member.
- Leg 5 – $300 credit card issued by Visa and a Wii for each team member.
- Leg 6 – $400 credit card issued by Visa and a Palm Treo Pro for each team member.
- Leg 7 – $400 credit card issued by Visa and a Wii for each team member.
- Leg 8 – $500 credit card issued by Visa and a Palm Treo Pro for each team member.
- Leg 9 – $600 credit card issued by Visa and a Nintendo DSi for each team member.
- Leg 10 – $800 credit card issued by Visa and a Palm Treo Pro for each team member.
- Leg 11 – $1000 credit card issued by Visa and a Palm Treo Pro for each team member, and a 7-night stay at The Fairmont Mayakoba Hotel & Spa located at the Riviera Maya, Mexico with a spa treatment.
- Leg 12:
  - Midpoint – 2 tickets courtesy of Mexicana Airlines, 7 nights in the State of Yucatán (2 nights at Hotel Mayaland Resort, Chichen Itza + 3 nights at the Hacienda Xcanatún, Mérida + 2 nights at Hotel Lodge Uxmal, Uxmal).
  - Finish Line – $250,000

== Race summary ==
Final route map

Destinations	Air travel Rail travel Water travel Bus travel Helicopter travel Bicycle travel Gondola travel
Route Markers	Desvío (Detour) Obstáculo (Roadblock) Avance (Fast Forward) Alto (Yield); Retorno (U-Turn) Multa (Speed Bump) Parada (Pit Stop)

=== Leg 1 (Brazil) ===
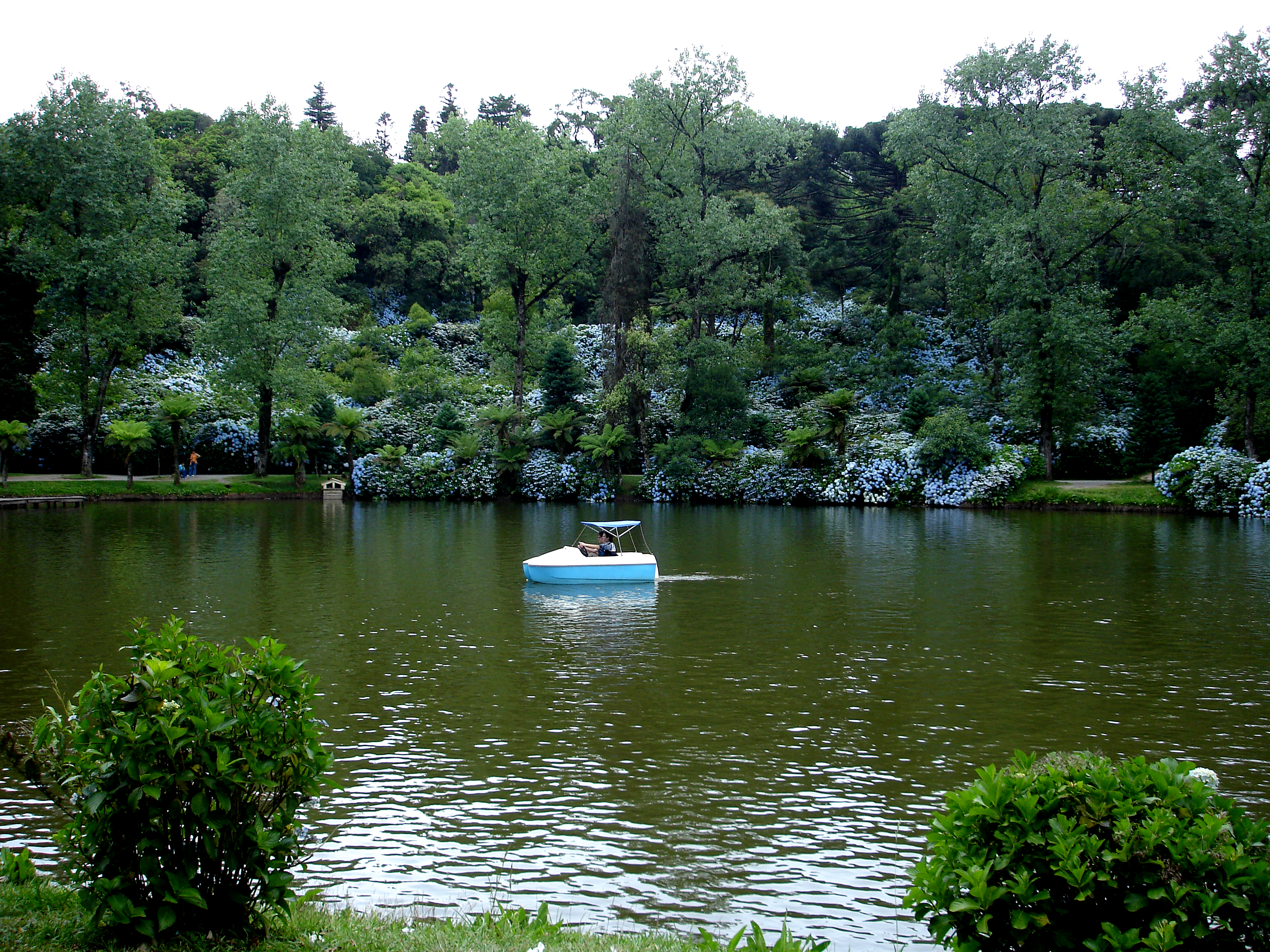
In Gramado, teams performed the Flores Detour on Lago Negro.

Airdate: September 20, 2009

- Iguaçu National Park, Paraná, Brazil (Iguaçu Falls Heliport) (Starting Line)
- Iguaçu National Park (Garganta do Diabo Falls)
- Iguaçu National Park (Espaço Naipi to Mirante 2)
- Iguaçu National Park (Cânion Iguaçu (in Portuguese) to Puerto Macuco)
- Foz do Iguaçu (Foz do Iguaçu International Airport) to Porto Alegre, Rio Grande do Sul (Salgado Filho International Airport)
- Porto Alegre (Hotel Deville)
- Gramado (Portico Taquara)
- Gramado (Lago Negro or Aldeia Do Papai Noel)
- Gramado (Mini Mundo (in Portuguese))
- Gramado (Hotel Ritta Höppner)

This series' first Detour was a choice between Flores (Flowers) or Árbol (Tree). In Flores, teams made their way to Lago Negro, where they had to paddle a swan boat across the lake to pick up a basket of flowers from a villager. Then they had to go back to the dock and give the basket to a female villager to receive their next clue. In Árbol, teams made their way to the Aldeia Do Papai Noel, where they had to search the "Arvore dos Desejos" for a wooden block called a "mimo" with their names written on it that they had to give to an elf to receive their next clue.

Additional tasks

- At Garganta do Diabo Falls, teams were instructed to find bikes at Espaço Naipi and then ride to Mirante 2. From there, teams had to walk to the Canion Iguaçu entrance to find their next clue.
- At Canion Iguaçu, teams had to rappel down to the Iguaçu River and then raft four kilometres (2.5 mi) down the river to Puerto Macuco to find their next clue.
- At Foz do Iguaçu International Airport, teams had to sign up for one of two flights to Porto Alegre. The first flight would carry six teams and would depart just over ten hours before the second flight with the remaining five teams. Teams would be released in the order and with the time differences when they signed up.
- At Hotel Deville, teams had to wait until noon for the hotel's valet to give them keys to a car with their next clue.
- At Mini Mundo, teams were given a board with five pictures of characters and five pictures of places and had to search the park to correctly match each place where a character was located to receive their next clue.

=== Leg 2 (Brazil → Argentina) ===
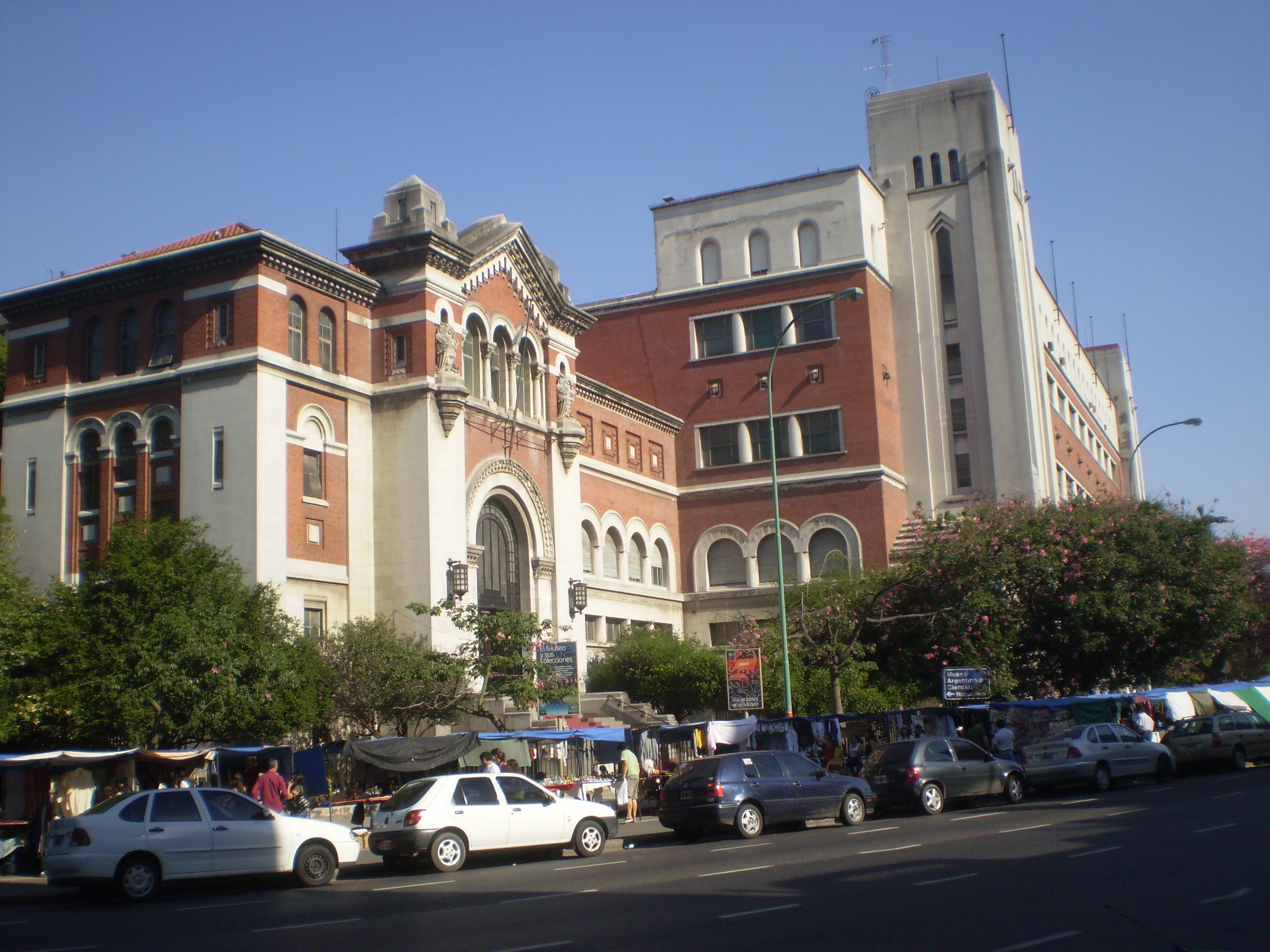
At the Museo Argentino de Ciencias Naturales, teams had to build a Tyrannosaurus rex.

- Airdate: September 27, 2009
- Eliminated: Nora & Ariel

Locations

- Gramado (Hotel Ritta Höppner)
- Porto Alegre (Estádio Olímpico Monumental)
- & Porto Alegre (Estádio Olímpico Monumental → Salgado Filho International Airport)
- Porto Alegre (Salgado Filho International Airport) → Buenos Aires, Argentina (Ministro Pistarini International Airport)
- Buenos Aires (Museo Argentino de Ciencias Naturales)
- San Isidro (Centro de Entrenamiento Jockey Club)
- Buenos Aires (Buenos Aires Zoo)
- Buenos Aires (United Nations Square – Floralis Genérica)

Episode summary

- At the start of this leg, teams had to drive to Estádio Olímpico Monumental in order to find their next clue.
- In the series' first Roadblock, one team member had to search the Estádio Olímpico Monumental for a gym bag which contained a goalkeeper uniform, don the uniform, and then successfully block a penalty kick in order to receive their next clue. If they were unsuccessful after five minutes, they had to go to the back of the line before they could try again.
- After the Roadblock, teams were instructed to fly to Buenos Aires, Argentina. Teams were released from the airport in Buenos Aires in the same order in which they had arrived at the airport in Porto Alegre. Teams found their next clue at the Museo Argentino de Ciencias Naturales and had to build a scale-model Tyrannosaurus rex to the satisfaction of a paleontologist in order to receive their next clue directing them to the Centro de Entrenamiento Jockey Club.
- For their Speed Bump, Nora & Ariel had to deliver a pack of newspapers to each of five newsstands before they could continue racing.
- This leg's Detour was a choice between Caballos (Horses) or Caballerizas (Stables). In Caballos, teams had to ride horses around the arena and pick up two flags that they could exchange for their next clue. In Caballerizas, teams had to completely clean a stable and take the waste in a wheelbarrow to the fertilizer reservoir in order to receive their next clue.
- After the Detour, teams had to hire a remise to go to the Buenos Aires Zoo and find a living statue of a gaucho, to whom they had to give money in order to receive their next clue directing them to the Pit Stop: the Floralis Genérica at the Plaza de las Naciones Unidas.

=== Leg 3 (Argentina) ===
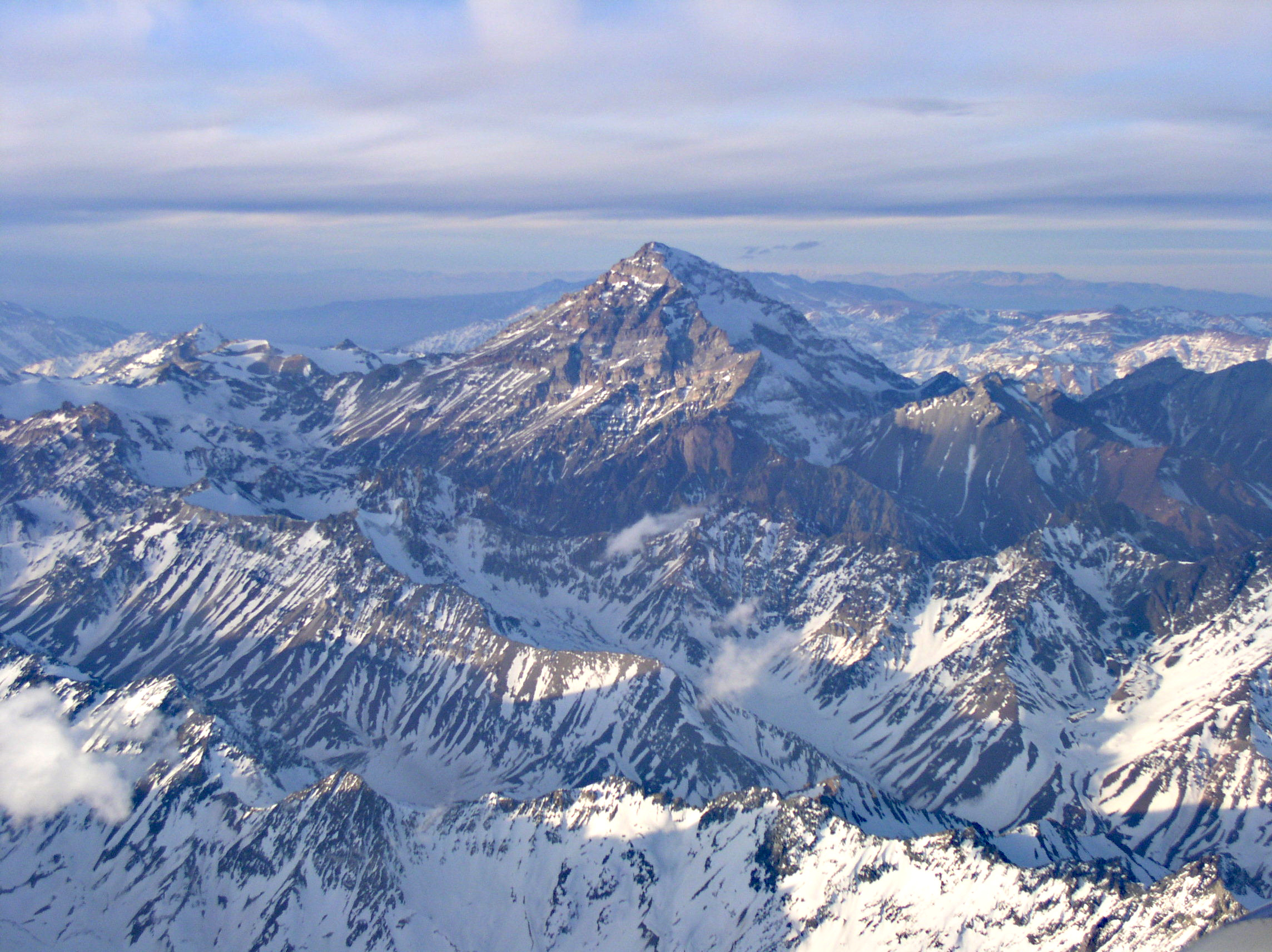
The viewpoint of Aconcagua in Mendoza Province was the third Pit Stop.

Airdate: October 4, 2009

- Buenos Aires (Aeroparque Jorge Newbery) to Mendoza (Francisco Gabrielli International Airport)
- Mendoza (Parque San Martín)
  - Mendoza (Monumento al Ejército de los Andes)
- Luján de Cuyo (Bodega Ruca Malen)
- Villa Potrerillos (Rotonda)
- Villa Potrerillos (Mendoza River) or Uspallata (Cerro Tunduqueral (in Spanish))
- Puente del Inca Village (Feria de Puente del Inca)
- Aconcagua Provincial Park (Mirador Aconcagua)

In this season's only Fast Forward, one team had to arrange 1,000 toy soldiers to make 25 rows with 40 soldiers in each to win the Fast Forward award.

In this leg's Roadblock, one team member had to search a vineyard for 18 wine bottles of three different colors, label them, and put the bottles in their corresponding boxes to receive their next clue.

This leg's Detour was a choice between Aire (Air) or Piedra (Stone). In Aire, teams had to ride a zip-line over the Mendoza River to receive their next clue. In Piedra, teams received a stone with a drawing and had to search Cerro Tunduqueral for the matching petroglyph to receive their next clue from a shaman.

Additional tasks

- At Parque San Martín, teams had to find their next clue on a marked vehicle.
- At Feria de Puente del Inca, both team members had to write a message at least 50 words long on a postcard to their families to receive their next clue from the postman.

=== Leg 4 (Argentina → Chile) ===
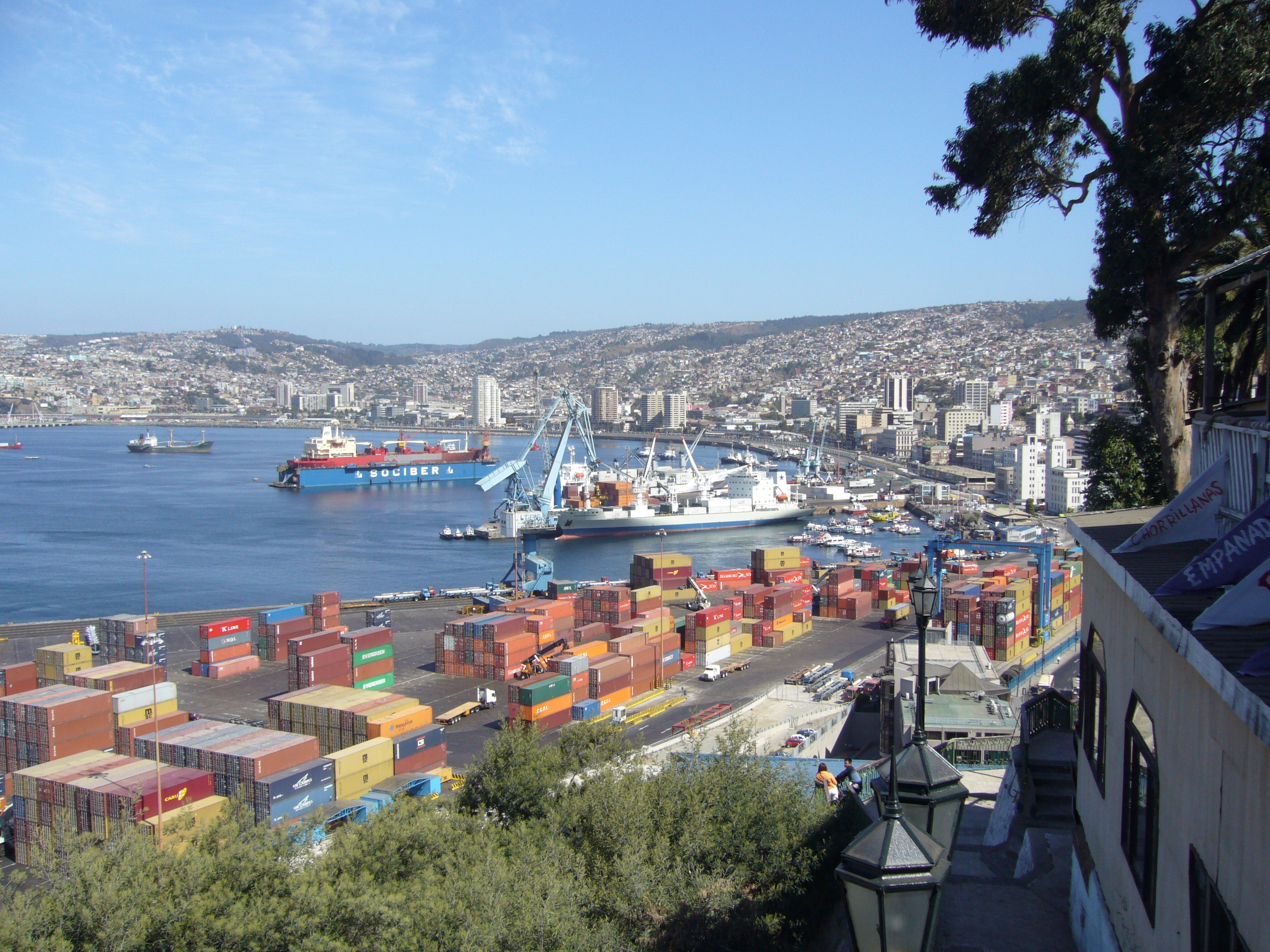
Teams spent the majority of this leg in the city of Valparaíso.

Airdate: October 11, 2009

- Santiago, Chile (Baquedano Metro Station – Bibliometro)
- Santiago (Baquedano Metro Station to Pajaritos Metro Station)
- Santiago (Pajaritos Bus Station) to Valparaíso (Terminal Rodoviario de Valparaíso (in Spanish))
- Valparaíso (Ascensor Concepción)
- Valparaíso (Paseo Atkinson)
- Valparaíso (Ascensor El Peral)
- Valparaíso (Muelle Prat to Muelle Barón (in Spanish))
- Valparaíso (Caleta Portales (in Spanish))
- Valparaíso (Terminal Rodoviario de Valparaíso) to Santiago (Pajaritos Bus Station)
- Santiago (Palacio de La Moneda)

In this leg's Roadblock, one team member had to jump from a platform into the Pacific Ocean and swim 30 meters underneath the platform to receive next clue.

This leg's Detour was a choice between Mariscos (Seafood) or Carnada (Bait). In Mariscos, teams had to eat an entire plate of a cold mollusk dish called Mariscal Frío to receive their next clue. In Carnada, teams had to place bait onto 100 fish hooks to receive their next clue.

Additional tasks

- At the start of the leg, teams had to board a van, each of which carried three teams, that would take them to Santiago.
- At Baquedano Metro Station, teams had to find the Bibliometro and ask for a copy of Historia de la vida privada en Chile, Volume 2, which had their next clue.
- Once in Valparaíso, teams had to find the site from the cover of the book they received in Santiago, Paseo Atkinson, and then find a girl identical to the one on the book cover to receive their next clue.
- After riding Ascensor El Peral down to Muelle Prat, teams had to travel by boat to Muelle Barón to find their next clue.
- At Caleta Portales, teams had to find a Diego Maradona impersonator to receive their next clue.

=== Leg 5 (Chile → Peru) ===
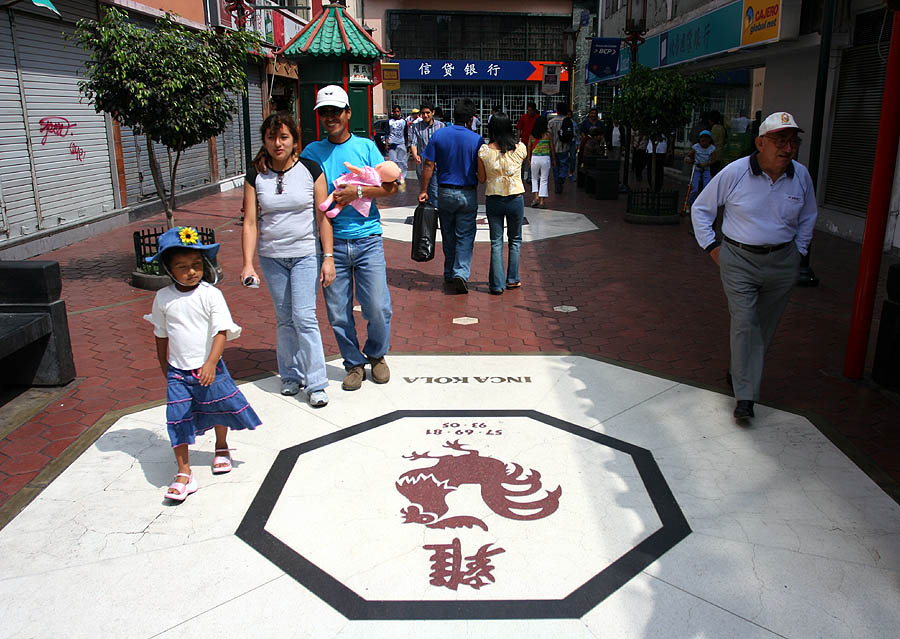
Teams performed the leg's Detour in the Chinatown of Lima.

Airdate: October 18, 2009

- Santiago (Museo Interactivo Mirador (in Spanish))
- Santiago (Arturo Merino Benítez International Airport) to Lima, Peru (Jorge Chávez International Airport)
- Lima (Faro La Marina)
- Lima (Makaja Beach)
- Lima (Chinatown)
- Lima (Catacumbas del Convento de San Francisco de Asís)
- Lima (Parque de la Reserva)

In this leg's Roadblock, one team member had to make a big soap bubble, drive a robot to transport two stones, then read a famous scientific quotation out loud in a gyroscope to receive their next clue.

This leg's Detour was a choice between Dulce (Sweet) or Salado (Salted). In Dulce, teams had to buy a packet of fortune cookie with a provided Visa card at Hong Kong Market and search for the one cookie containing a message. Then they had to find that message in the sidewalk tiles on Capon Street to receive their next clue from the Chinese master. In Salado, teams had to buy two cutting boards and a knife with a provided Visa card at Hong Kong Market, find the Salón China Restaurant and cut two ducks, three kilograms (6.6 lb) of onions and ten heads of garlic to receive their next clue from the chef.

Additional task

- At Makaja Beach, both team members had to paddle a surfboard to a buoy and return to shore to receive their next clue.

=== Leg 6 (Peru) ===
Machu Picchu was the 6th Pit Stop of the season.

Airdate: October 25, 2009

- Lima (Jorge Chávez International Airport) to Cusco (Alejandro Velasco Astete International Airport)
- Cusco (Hotel Europa) (Overnight Rest)
- Cusco (Plazoleta de San Blas)
- Cusco (Action Valley)
- Písac (Písac Bridge)
- Písac (Písac Market)
- Písac (Písac Archaeological Park)
- Ollantaytambo, Urubamba Province (Puesto de Lanas)
- Ollantaytambo (Ollantaytambo Train Station) to Aguas Calientes (Machu Picchu Train Station)
- Aguas Calientes (Machu Picchu Train Station) to Machu Picchu
- Machu Picchu (Recinto Del Guardián)

In this leg's Roadblock, one team member had to perform the highest bungee jump in South America to receive their next clue.

This leg's Detour was a choice between Hojas (Leaves) or Granos (Grains). In Hojas, teams had to search for three coca leaves among many different leaves and give them to the Master Healer to receive their next clue. In Granos, teams had to transport 100 maize cobs through a large course to receive their next clue from the cacique.

Additional tasks

- At Hotel Europa, teams had to sign up for one of three departure times, all of which were the following morning.
- At Plazoleta de San Blas, teams had to find Ñusta Maria to receive their next clue.
- From Pisac Bridge, teams had to take local transportation to the Písac Market, where they had to search for a particular stall for their next clue.
- At Puesto de Lanas, teams had to unravel balls of wool until they found a huayruro seed with the word 'Peru' and then deliver the seed to Quispe's house to receive their next clue.

=== Leg 7 (Peru → Colombia) ===
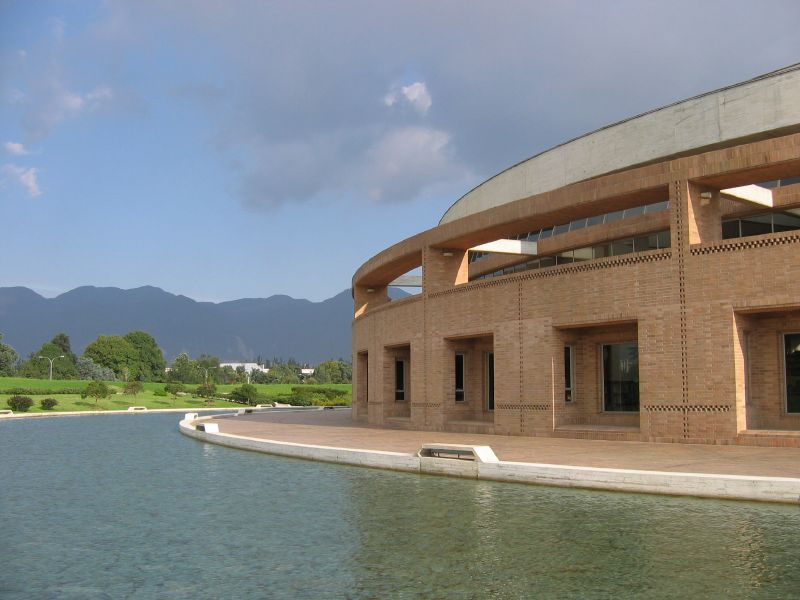
Teams performed the "Visual" option of the leg's Detour in the Virgilio Barco Public Library.

Airdate: November 1, 2009

- Aguas Calientes (Machu Picchu Train Station) to Ollantaytambo (Ollantaytambo Train Station)
- Cusco (Alejandro Velasco Astete International Airport) to Bogotá, Colombia (El Dorado International Airport)
- Útica (Cascada La Papaya)
- Fusagasugá (Coloma Farm)
- Bogotá (Botero Museum)
- Bogotá (Virgilio Barco Public Library (in Spanish) or Spa Luisa Plata)
- Bogotá (ETB Phone Booth)
  - Bogotá (Campo de Tejo Los Bucaros)
- Bogotá (Torre Colpatria)

In this leg's Roadblock, one team member had to rappel down a waterfall to receive the next clue.

This leg's Detour was a choice between Visual or Táctil (Tactile). In Visual, teams had 15 seconds to observe a Fernando Botero painting in Virgilio Barco Public Library, then fill in another painting with the correct missing colors to receive their next clue. In Táctil, teams had to receive a chocolate massage to receive their next clue.

For their Speed Bump, Casilda & Casilda had to play tejo until one team member struck a gunpowder-loaded target with a stone before they could continue racing.

Additional tasks

- In Coloma Farm, teams had to fill and sew four bags with 44 pounds (20 kg) of coffee in each one to receive the next clue.
- At a ETB Phone Booth near Santamaría Bullring, teams had to call a number to listen to their next clue.

=== Leg 8 (Colombia) ===
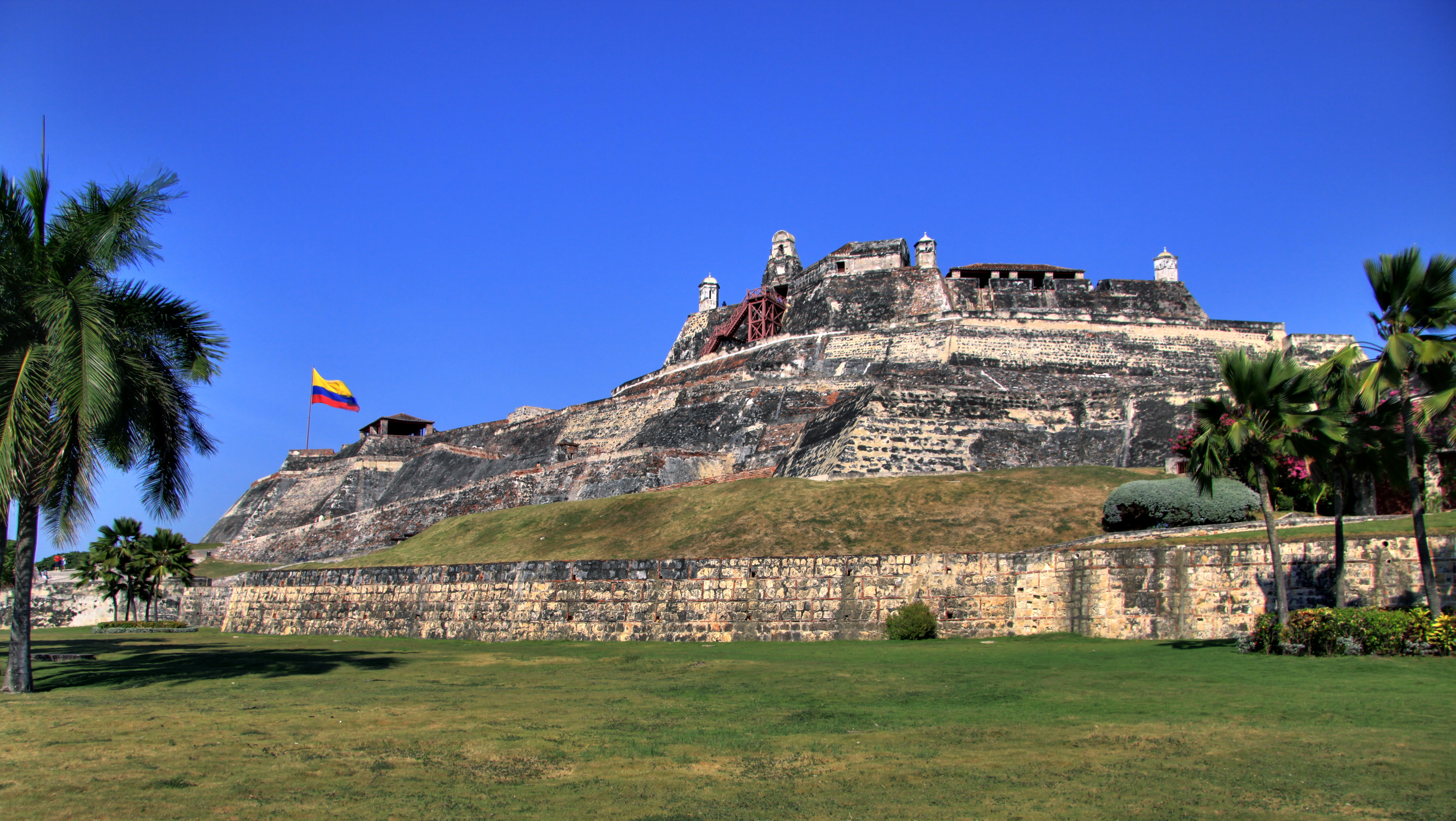
Castillo San Felipe de Barajas was the eight Pit Stop.

Airdate: November 8, 2009

- Bogotá (Plaza de Las Nieves – Portal Interactivo ETB)
- Bogotá (El Dorado International Airport) to Cartagena (Rafael Núñez International Airport)
- Cartagena (Hotel Sofitel Cartagena Santa Clara)
- Cartagena (Baluarte de Santiago)
- Cartagena (Baluarte Santo Domingo and Baluarte San Pedro Mártir or Los Pegasos Pier – Phantom Pirate Ship)
- Cartagena (Parque de Las Flores)
- Cartagena (Portal de los Dulces)
- Cartagena (Castillo San Felipe de Barajas)

This leg's Detour was a choice between Hacia Adelante (Onward) or Hacia Arriba (Upward). In Hacia Adelante, teams had to go to Baluarte Santo Domingo, retrieve 12 baskets, and deliver them to Baluarte San Pedro Mártir to receive their next clue. In Hacia Arriba, teams had to climb up a ship's mast, take two flags, and give them to the captain to receive their next clue.

In this leg's Roadblock, one team member had to eat a bottle of local candies to receive their next clue.

Additional tasks

- At Portal Interactivo ETB, teams had to check in on the website AeroRepública, then go to the airport to receive their next clue from a flight attendant.
- At Hotel Sofitel Cartagena Santa Clara, teams had to unscramble a phrase from the novel Love in the Time of Cholera, written by Gabriel García Márquez. They had to look for the phrase in a copy of the novel. When they thought it was right, they had to say the phrase to the typist, then give the paper with the phrase on it to a judge to analyze; if the phrase was right they would receive their next clue.
- At Parque de Las Flores, teams had to search for a salesman with their next clue.

=== Leg 9 (Colombia → Panama) ===
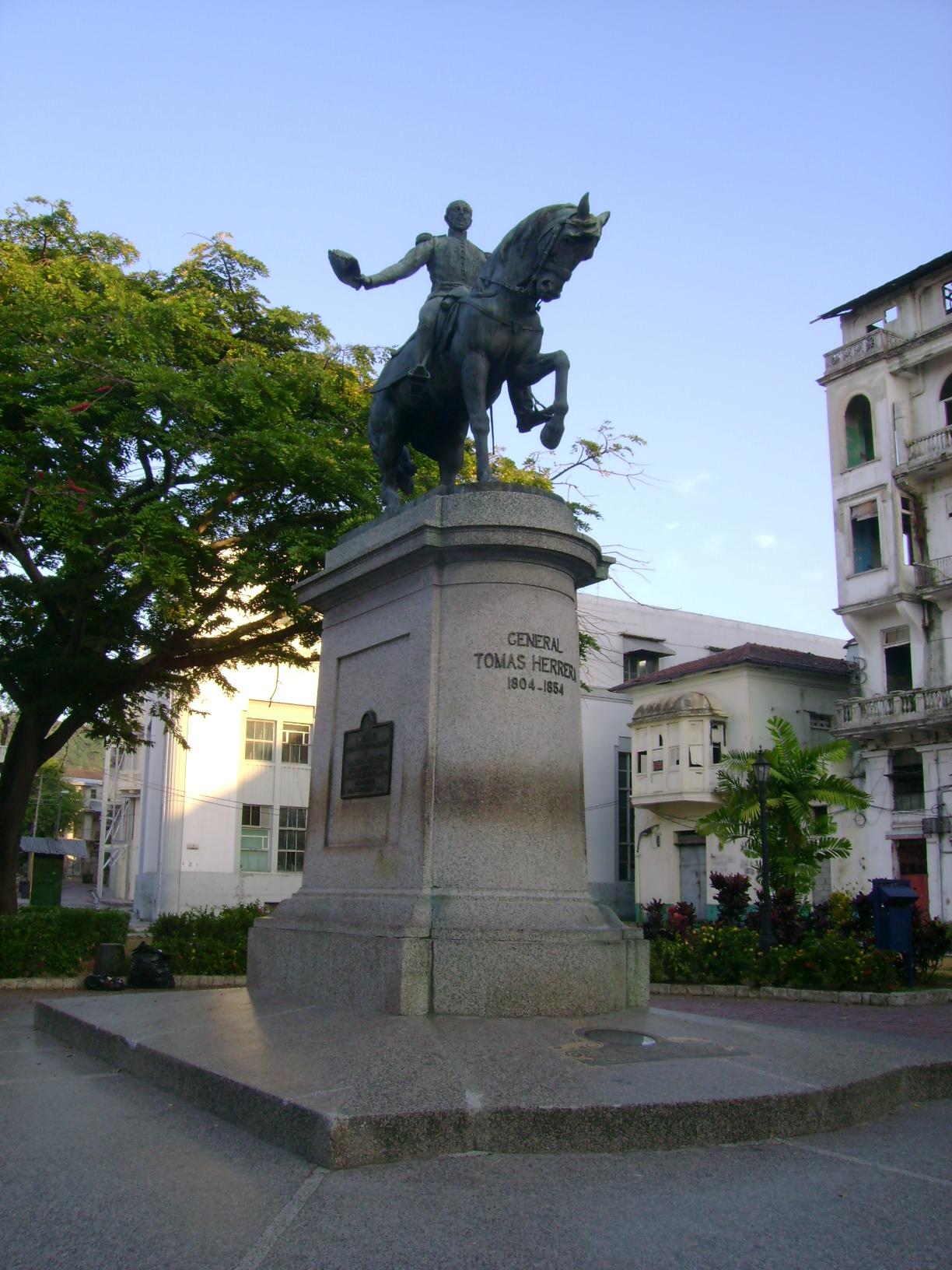
Teams found their Detour clue at Herrera Square.

Airdate: November 15, 2009

- Cartagena (Rafael Núñez International Airport) to Panama City, Panama (Tocumen International Airport)
- Panama City (Figali Convention Center to Herrera Square)
- Panama City (Miraflores Locks Visitor Center or Sidmar Marine Training School)
- Panama City (Passenger Station of Corozal)
- Panama City (Cargo Terminal of the Pacific)
- Gamboa (Gamboa Rainforest Resort Marina)
- Gamboa (San Antonio Island)
- Gamboa (Gamboa Rainforest Resort)

This leg's Detour was a choice between Pasacables (Cableman) or Timonel (Helmsman). In Pasacables, teams had to go to the Miraflores Locks Visitor Center, then pass a cable above a metal rod high above them. After passing three cables above the rod (with six shots per turn), a cableman would give them the next clue. In Timonel, teams had to go to Sidmar Marine Training School and sail a boat in a simulator of the Panama Canal without crashing into any other boat for 15 minutes to receive their next clue from the captain.

In this leg's Roadblock, one team member had to search among 60 freight wagons at the Cargo Terminal of the Pacific for a working lamp to receive their next clue.

Additional tasks

- At Figali Convention Center, teams received a picture and had to look for that picture painted on a Diablo Rojo to receive their next clue. Then teams had to travel by Diablo Rojo to their next destination.
- At the Gamboa Rainforest Resort Marina, teams had to find their next clue among the boats. Then they had to take a boat to San Antonio Island.
- On San Antonio Island, each team member had to put a traditional Embera tattoo on the other. When finished, they had to row in a native canoe until they reached a trail that took them to the Pit Stop.

=== Leg 10 (Panama → Dominican Republic) ===
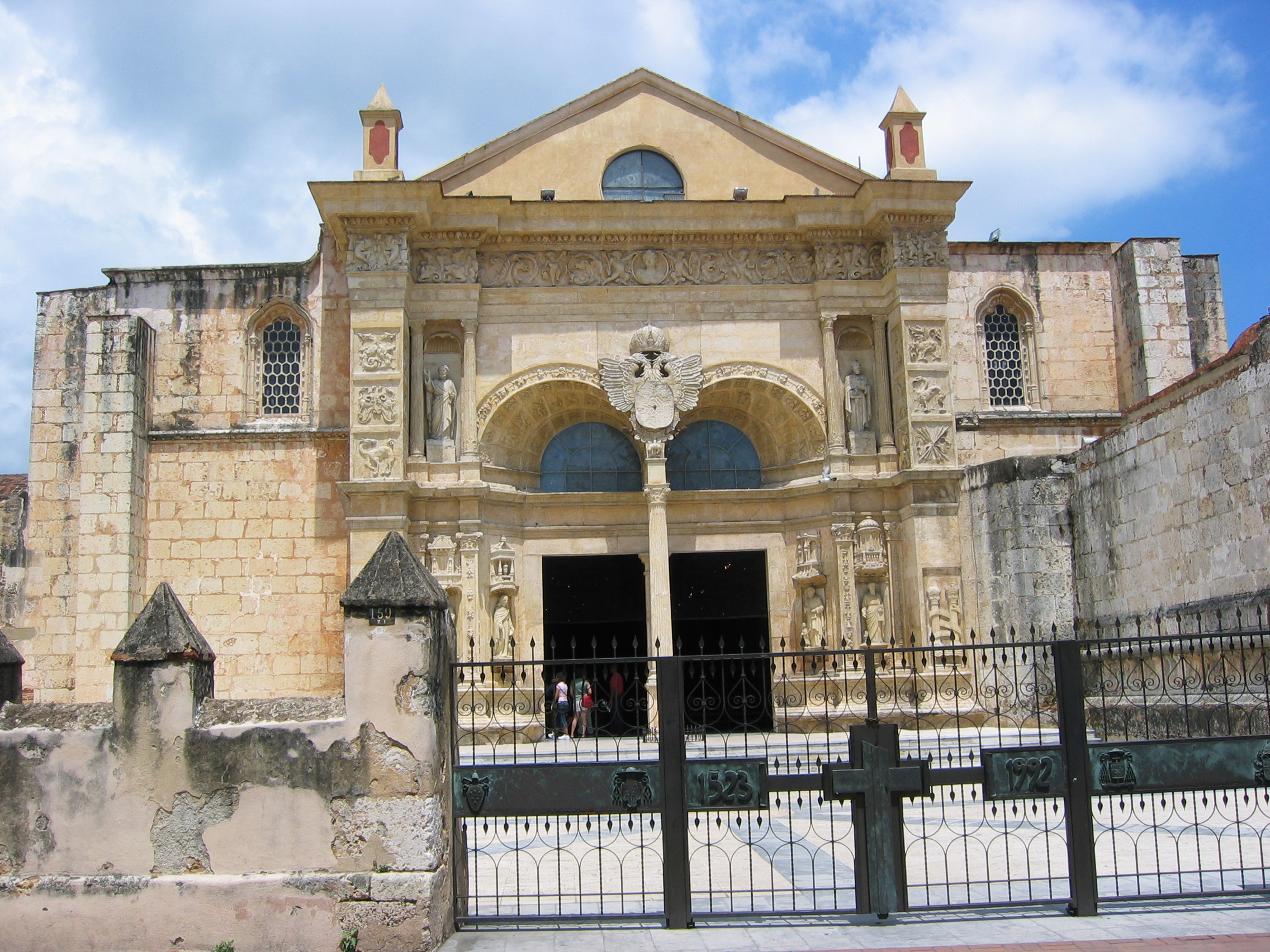
Teams visited the Primada de América cathedral in this leg.

Airdate: November 22, 2009

- Panama City (Tocumen International Airport) to Santo Domingo, Dominican Republic (Las Americas International Airport)
- Santo Domingo (Catedral Primada de América)
- Santo Domingo (Estadio Quisqueya)
- Santo Domingo (Caoba Cigar Factory) (Overnight Rest)
- San Pedro de Macorís (Mauricio Báez Bridge)
- Hato Mayor del Rey (Rancho Capote)
- Santo Domingo (Alcázar de Colón)

In this leg's Roadblock, one team member had to hit a professional pitcher's throw to receive their next clue.

This leg's Detour was a choice between Ofrenda (Offering) or Astucia (Cunning). In Ofrenda, teams had to search for a small statuette inside a cave, take it to a big statuette in another place in the cave, and place it as an offering to receive their next clue. In Astucia, teams had to form a square from pieces of a tangram to receive their next clue.

Additional task

- At the Caoba Cigar Factory, teams had to roll 10 cigars to receive their next clue.

=== Leg 11 (Dominican Republic → Costa Rica) ===
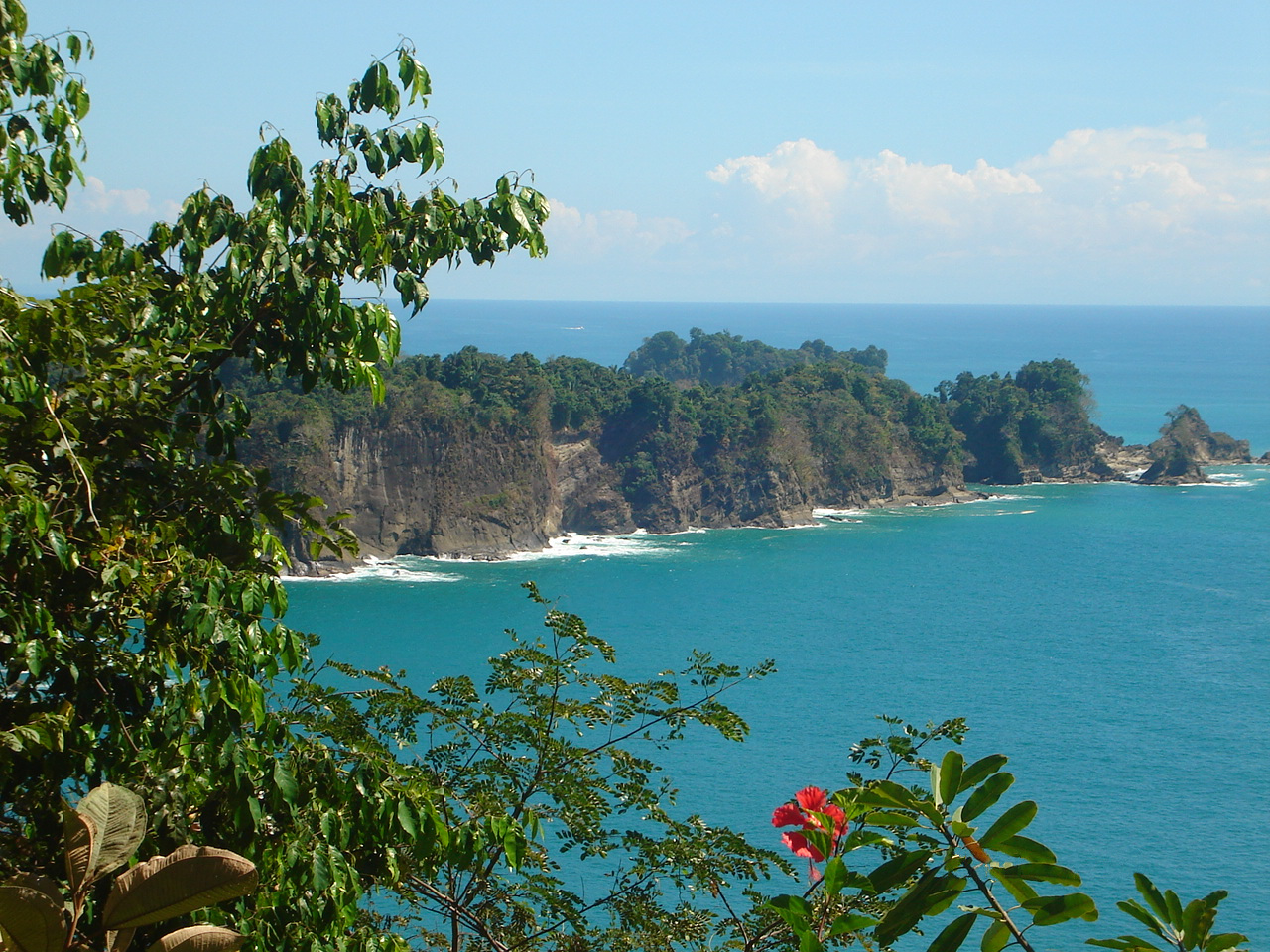
Manuel Antonio National Park was visited on this leg.

Airdate: November 29, 2009

- Santo Domingo (Las Americas International Airport) to Quepos, Costa Rica (Quepos Managua Airport)
- Manuel Antonio National Park (Gemelas Beach)
- Manuel Antonio National Park (Punta Catedral Footpath) (Overnight Rest)
- Manuel Antonio National Park (Espadilla Norte Beach)
  - Manuel Antonio National Park (Manuel Antonio Hotel)
- Quepos to San José
- San José (Planetarium at the University of Costa Rica (in Spanish))
- Irazú Volcano National Park (Irazú Volcano)

In this leg's Roadblock, one team member had to choose a site, dig to get a chest with keys inside, then search for another chest and try to open it with one of the keys they found. The clue was inside one of the chests, but there were many empty chests buried.

This leg's Detour was a choice between Palas (Shovels) or Remos (Paddles). In Palas, teams had to create the picture of a seahorse in the sand, following an example exactly. When they had completed this correctly, the sculptor would give them their next clue. In Remos, teams had to row a kayak to a boat in the sea, where a sailor would give them their next clue.

For their Speed Bump, Matías & Tamara had to set up six hotel rooms by making the beds and folding a pair of towel swans in each room before they could continue racing.

Additional tasks

- At Espadilla Norte Beach, teams had to solve a mathematical challenge in which they had to discover the heaviest coconut among eight coconuts using a scale to receive their next clue.
- In the Planetarium at University of Costa Rica, teams had to order the planets of the Solar System by their distance from the Sun, from nearest to farthest including Ceres, Pluto and Eris, to receive their next clue.

=== Leg 12 (Costa Rica → Mexico) ===
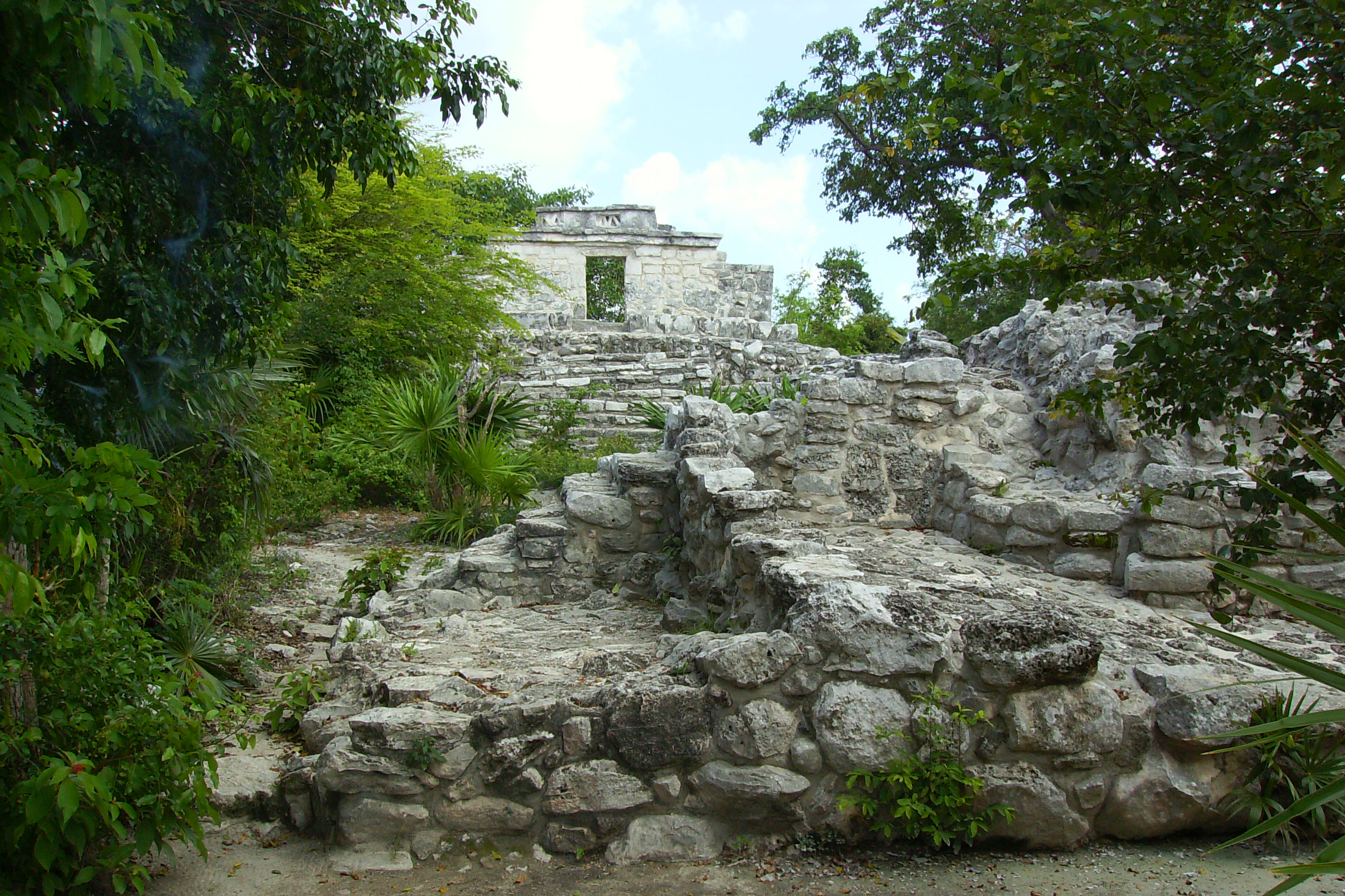
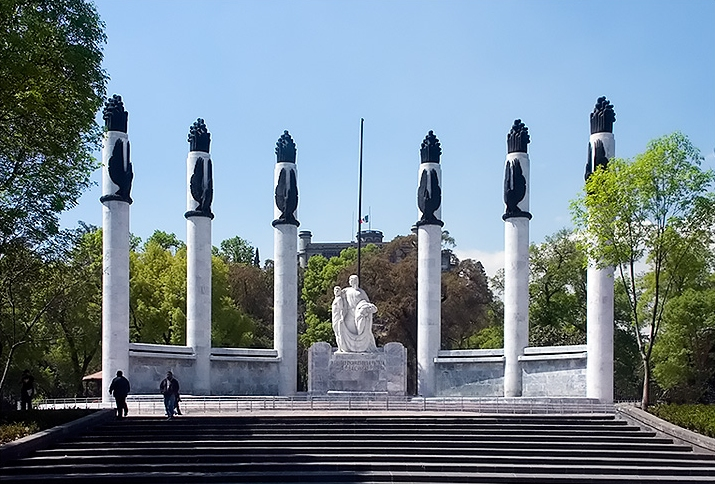
The double-length leg in Mexico where teams visited Xcaret Eco Park for the Detour, and Altar to the Nation in Chapultepec Park was the Finish Line for the first season of The Amazing Race en Discovery Channel.

Airdates: December 6 and 13, 2009

- San José (Juan Santamaría International Airport) to Cancún, Quintana Roo, Mexico (Cancún International Airport)
- Cancún (AquaFun Marina)
- Cancún (Nizuc Bridge)
- Playa del Carmen (Blue Parrot Restaurant)
- Playa Del Carmen (Xcaret Eco Park) (Overnight Rest)
- Pacchen (Cenote del Jaguar)
- Playa Del Carmen (Hotel Fairmont Mayakoba)
- Cancún (Cancun International Airport) to Mexico City (Mexico City International Airport)
- Mexico City (Angel of Independence) (Overnight Rest)
- Mexico City (Paseo de la Reforma – Go Visa Ad)
- Mexico City (Arena México)
- Xochimilco (Embarcadero Nuevo Nativitas)
- Mexico City (Estadio Olímpico Universitario)
- Mexico City (Chapultepec Park – Altar to the Nation)

In this leg's first Roadblock, one team member had to eat three Mexican tacos with grasshoppers, Maguey Worm and several species of cricket to receive their next clue from the waiter.

This leg's first Detour was a choice between Altura (Height) or Profundidad (Deepness). In Altura, teams had three minutes to climb a greasy pole with each team member having to grab a flag from the top of the pole to receive their next clue. In Profundidad, teams had three minutes to dive into a shark tank, where each team member had to find a marked stone on the bottom of the tank to receive their next clue.

In this season's final Roadblock, one team member, regardless of who performed the first Roadblock, had to grab a flag from one wrestler's boot in three minutes to receive their next clue.

This season's final Detour was a choice between Mariachis or Trajineras. In Mariachis, teams had to find an image of Santa Muerte under a hat worn by one of the mariachis playing to receive their next clue. In Trajineras, teams had to find a trajinera (typical boats of Xochimilco) called "Zita" and find the clue inside the boat.

Additional tasks

- In Cenote del Jaguar, teams had to participate in a Mayan ritual, enter a cenote, and search for their next clue in the wall.
- At the Angel of Independence, teams had to drive a Segway to a Go Visa advertisement with only a picture as reference.
- At Estadio Olímpico's court, teams had to match the Pit Stops with the greeters in order of appearance to receive their final clue.
