= Metropolitan school =

Metropolitan school may refer to:

- Metropolitanskolen, Danish school in Copenhagen founded in 1209
- The Metropolitan School, in Karachi, Pakistan
- The Metropolitan School of Panama, in Panama City
