= St Joseph's Convent School, Karachi =

St Joseph's Convent School
- St Joseph's Convent School, Karachi

Location
- Shahrah-e-Iraq, Karachi, Sindh; Pakistan; 24°51′40″N 67°02′07″E

Information
- Other name: St Joseph's Convent High School
- Type: Private primary and secondary school
- Motto: Forward God helping
- Religious affiliation: Catholicism
- Denomination: Daughters of the Cross
- Established: 18 March 1862; 164 years ago
- Founders: Daughters of the Cross; Monsignor Steins
- Oversight: Catholic Board of Education; Board of Secondary Education, Karachi
- Principal: Sr. Elizabeth Niamat FC
- Gender: Girls
- Age: 5 to 16
- Enrolment: c. 2000

St Joseph's Convent School, Karachi is a private Catholic primary and secondary school for girls located in Saddar Town, Karachi, Pakistan.

== History ==
In 1861, Monsignor Steins, Vicar Apostolic of Bombay passing through Belgium, called Mother Marie Therese, Superior General and founder of the Daughters of the Cross, and asked for several of her sisters to work in the Indian mission field. Canon Habets, co-founder, advised the Sisters to offer themselves for the mission. The school was founded in 1862 by the planning of Monsignor Steins, Vicar Apostolic of Bombay of that time and five Sisters of the Cross.

On 27 January 1862, the journey began. Five Sisters set off and arrived on 16 February in Bombay, where they received a hearty welcome from Bishop Steins. There the Sisters heard for the first time that they were to work in Karachi, and that he would travel along with them very shortly. Thus, on 13 March 1862, five Daughters of the Cross first set foot on the sandy soil of Sindh, and immediately began their apostolate to the people of Karachi. On 18 March 1862 the school began with ten pupils; gradually the number of pupils increased. A new building was built, and inside the foundation stone was placed an elaborate inscription hoping that the building raised above it "might be the home whence good morals and sound learning may be diffused throughout this town and the Province of Sindh."

In 1863 a new group of Sisters arrived. In 1869 an upper storey was added to the Convent, providing accommodation for the boarders and from January 1871 the institution was known as St Joseph's Convent. After many years in 1951 the college was built. After the new St Patrick's Church was built, the Convent acquired the use of the old Church, which was rebuilt into the present fine Hall, with a built-in stage. 1901 saw the building of the present Convent Chapel with the classrooms below. The roof of this was torn off six months later in a violent cyclone that swept over Karachi.

In 1911, St Patrick's and St Joseph's held their golden jubilee with a combined P.T. display and the performance of a play, William Tell, in the G.P. Hall. That year five pupils, Ethel Raymond, Annie Rodrigues, Eugene Nunes, Mary Lastellino and Mary D'Souza, appeared for their Matriculation Examination, and all passed. Ethel Raymond passed 2nd in Sindh and won a scholarship.

In 1958 the swimming pool was closed and transformed into the Lourdes House, and in 1965 a part of the garden saw the raising of the present Primary Block. With the creation of Pakistan a new challenge was thrown to the Sisters. The people who migrated to Pakistan were looking for schools for their children and the Sisters responded generously, stretching their capacity to the limit. Today the school has more than 2000 pupils on its rolls.

On 18 July 1989, the mayor of Faisalabad and Belgian ambassador to Pakistan renamed a public square "Belgium Square" to honor Belgian nuns who founded St. Joseph’s in Karachi 125 years ago.

== Principals ==
Ordinal	Principal	Start date	End date	Time in office	Notes
1	Sr. Zinia Pinto, FC	1963	1993	29–30 years	
2	Sr. Patricia Anne Gosse, FC	1993	1994	0–1 years	
3	Sr. Dorothy Dias, FC	1994	1999	4–5 years	
4	Sr. Julie M. Pacheco, FC	1999	2012	12–13 years	
5	Sr. Anila Constant, FC	2012	2019	6–7 years	
6	Sr. Elizabeth Niamat, FC	2019	incumbent	6–7 years	

== Extracurricular activities ==
The Annual Sports Day is an event organized by much enthusiasm and hard-work. The activities include march past, races, disc and javelin throw, and P.T displays. The field trips too are a norm and feature educational trips. Other SJC events include the Milaad, Naat Competitions, Feast Day Celebration, Independence Day Celebrations, and the Christmas Concert among many others.

=== Clubs ===
Clubs at the school include Scrabble Club, Art Club, Debating Society, Dramatics Society, Book Club, Sewing Club, and Chess Club.

== Notable alumni ==
- Shahnaz Wazir Ali, social activist, Special Assistant to the Prime Minister of Pakistan and chairperson of Higher Education Commission
- Alycia Dias, professional singer
- Jacqueline Maria Dias, professor of nursing
- Dr Salilah Hashmi, surgeon
- Mehreen Jabbar, film maker
- Sania Saeed, television artist
- Shahida Jamil, barrister and former minister
- Uzma Aslam Khan, novelist
- Dr Hamida Khuhro, politician, writer, professor, historian and former Sindh Minister for Education
- Maliha Lodhi, diplomat and journalist
- Marvi Memon, politician and MNA
- Zubeida Mustafa, journalist
- Kiran Nazish, award-winning journalist and activist
- Sadia Rashid, president of Hamdard Pakistan and chancellor of the Hamdard University
- Bridget Sequeira. She founded the Franciscan Missionaries of Christ the King.
- Dr. Nafisa Shah, Member of National Assembly and Chair of the National Commission for Human Development
- Aamina Sheikh, actress and supermodel
- Aileen Soares, teacher in this school for 50 years
- Joyann Thomas, football (soccer) player
- Lynette Viccaji, teacher and author

== See also ==
- List of schools in Karachi
