= Mary Emily Gonsalves =

Pakistani Roman Catholic nun

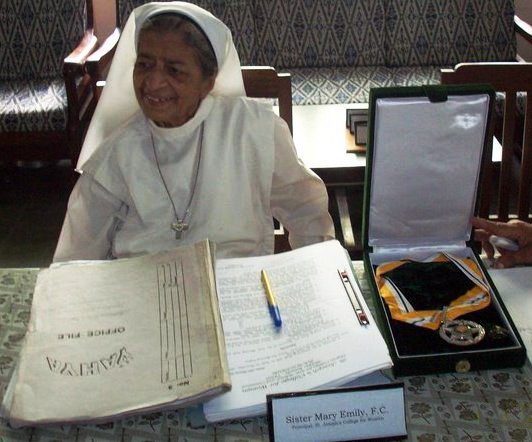
- Sister Mary Emily FC with her Sitara-e-Imtiaz medal
- Born: 1919; Mangalore, British Raj
- Died: 9 January 2017 (aged 97–98); Karachi, Pakistan
- Citizenship: Pakistani
- Education: Master's degree in English and economics
- Occupation: Religious sister
- Years active: 1944–2017
- Known for: Principal, St. Joseph's College, Karachi
- Awards: Sitara-e-Imtiaz

Mary Emily Gonsalves was a Roman Catholic nun from Karachi, Pakistan.

== Early life ==
She was born in Mangalore, India in 1919. She started her teaching career in a school in Byculla, Bombay in 1940. In 1944 she joined the Daughters of the Cross religious congregation. She went on to do a master's degree in English and economics. She taught at a college in Calcutta before she moved to Pakistan in 1957.

== Career ==
From 1972 to 1982 Sister Mary Emily was the Principal of the St. Joseph's College (Karachi), Pakistan, one of Pakistan's leading colleges. In 2007, 1,548 students were studying in the college with a total of 78 teachers.

In 2005, when St. Joseph's College was returned to the Catholic Board of Education Sr Emily was again appointed principal.

On 23 March 2009 the Government of Pakistan awarded Sr. Emily the Sitara-e-Imtiaz, which she received from the Governor of Sindh. This was in recognition of her services to education.

Sr. Emily died in Karachi on 9 January 2017. Her funeral was held at Saint Patrick's Cathedral, Karachi on January 10, 2017.
