= The Amazing Race (Latin American TV series) =

Latin American adventure reality game show

- Title card from the Space broadcasts
- Genre: Reality competition
- Created by: Elise Doganieri; Bertram van Munster
- Based on: The Amazing Race by: Bertram van Munster; Elise Doganieri
- Directed by: Marco Colantoni
- Presented by: Harris Whitbeck (2009–2011); Paulo Zulu (2012); Toya Montoya (2013–2014); Jaime Arellano (2014)
- Theme music composer: John M. Keane
- Country of origin: Latin America
- Original languages: Spanish and Portuguese
- No. of seasons: 6
- No. of episodes: 78

Production
- Executive producers: Leonardo Alanguibel, Fernando Barbosa, Ángel Zambrano, Mariano César, Gerardo Kerik, Jose V Scheuren, María Barrios
- Producers: Melyna Deluchi, Mimi Bejarano, Gabriela Núñez
- Running time: 60 minutes
- Production companies: Disney Media Networks Latin America; Turner Latin America; RGB (2009); Cinemat (2010–2013)

Original release
- Network: Discovery Latin America (2009–2010); Space (2011–2014); TC Televisión (2014)
- Release: 20 September 2009 – 28 December 2014

Related
- International versions

The Amazing Race, formerly known as The Amazing Race en Discovery Channel (Portuguese: The Amazing Race no Discovery Channel), is a Latin American reality competition show based on the American series The Amazing Race. Following the premise of other versions in the Amazing Race franchise, the show follows teams of two as they race across Latin America. Each season is split into legs, with teams tasked to deduce clues, navigate themselves in foreign areas, interact with locals, perform physical and mental challenges, and travel by air, boat, car, taxi, and other modes of transport. Teams are progressively eliminated at the end of most legs for being the last to arrive at designated Pit Stops. The first team to arrive at the Finish Line wins the grand prize of US$250,000 (seasons 1–5) or US$100,000 (season 6).

On 15 October 2008, a Latin American version of the show was announced by Discovery Channel Latin America in association with Disney. The first season was produced by Argentinian television production company RGB with the subsequent seasons produced by Miami-based television company Cinemat. On 25 January 2011, it was announced that Space in association with Disney was going to produce the third season of the Latin American version of the race, thus retitling the show to The Amazing Race, dropping the en Discovery Channel.

The show is the second Latin American version of the franchise. The first was The Amazing Race: A Corrida Milionária, the Brazilian version of the franchise. It was also the first version in the Spanish language.

The original presenter for the show was Guatemalan journalist Harris Whitbeck who presented the first three seasons. For the fourth season, a special Portuguese-language edition of the show, Edição Brasil, was made. It was hosted by Brazilian model and actor Paulo Zulu. It featured teams from Brazil in a race mostly concentrated across Brazil. For the fifth and sixth season, the show was presented by Colombian model María "Toya" Montoya, a former contestant on the third season. She was also the first female host of any version of The Amazing Race. For the sixth season, Jaime Arellano joined Montoya as a co-host.

== The Race ==
The Amazing Race is a reality television competition between teams of two in a race around Latin America. Each season is divided into a number of legs wherein teams travel and complete various tasks to obtain clues to help them progress to a Pit Stop where teams are given a chance to rest and recover before starting the next leg twelve hours later. The first team to arrive at a Pit Stop is often awarded a prize while the last team is normally eliminated (except in non-elimination legs, where the last team to arrive may be penalised in the following leg). The final leg is run by the last three remaining teams, and the first to arrive at the final destination wins the US$250,000 (seasons 1–5) or US$100,000 (season 6) cash prize.

=== Teams ===
Each of the eleven teams are composed of two individuals who have some type of relationship to each other. A total of 66 participants have joined so far.

The participants are all required to be able to communicate in Spanish. As well as Portuguese for Brazilian citizens. The contestants chosen to appear are from various Latin American countries and not limited to one country of origin. Participating countries include all citizens in Latin America except Cuba, French Guiana, Puerto Rico and Lesser Antilles (except for Aruba, Curaçao and Trinidad and Tobago). Additionally, teams from Jamaica and the Bahamas can participate.

=== Route Markers ===
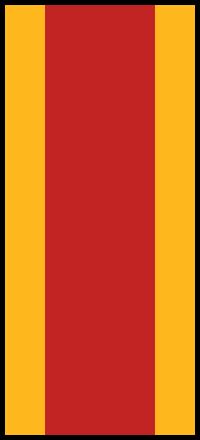

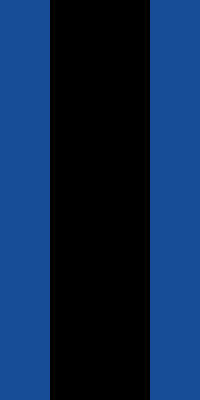

Route Markers are yellow and red flags that mark the places where teams must go. Most Route Markers are attached to the boxes that contain clue envelopes, but some may mark the place where the teams must go in order to complete tasks, or may be used to line a course that the teams must follow. The route markers in the first two seasons were colored blue and black, including the clue envelopes, and the Pit Stop mat is in red, blue and black color.

=== Clues ===
Clues are found throughout the rlegs in sealed envelopes, normally inside clue boxes. They give teams the information they need and tasks they need to do in order for them to progress through the legs.

Clues are written in both Spanish and Portuguese.

- Pista (Route Info): A general clue that may include a task to be completed by the team before they can receive their next clue.
- Desvío/Desvio (Detour): A choice of two tasks. Teams are free to choose either task or swap tasks if they find one option too difficult.
- Obstáculo (Roadblock): A task only one team member can complete. Teams must choose which member will complete the task based on a brief clue about the task before fully revealing the details of the task.
- Avance (Fast Forward): A task that only one team may complete, allowing that team to skip all remaining tasks and head directly to the next Pit Stop. Teams may only claim one Fast Forward during the entire season.

=== Obstacles ===
During the race, teams may encounter obstacles that may affect their position:

- Intersección/Intersecção (Intersection): Introduced in the second season, two teams must compete against each other (season 2) or team up with each other (season 3).

When the Intersection was introduced in season 2, it had drastically different rules than the American version. As opposed to two teams working together, the Intersection had two teams compete against each other in a task as they compete for higher placement; however, in season 3, the Intersection would have two teams working together, as in the American version.

- Alto (Yield): It is where a team can force another trailing team to wait a pre-determined amount of time before continuing the race.
- Retorno (U-Turn): It is located after a Detour where a team can force another trailing team to return and complete the other option of the Detour they did not select.

Both Yield and U-Turn are seen in separate legs and because of that, a team can use each once during the season. Teams may not Yield or U-Turn another team if both teams are within each other's lines of sight.

=== Legs ===
At the beginning of each leg, teams receive an allowance of cash, usually in U.S. dollars, to cover expenses during the legs (except for the purchase of airline tickets, which are paid-for by provided credit cards).

Teams then have to follow clues and Route Markers that will lead them to the various destinations and tasks they will face. Modes of travel between these destinations include commercial and chartered airplanes, boats, trains, taxis, buses, and rented vehicles provided by the show, or the teams may simply travel by foot. Each leg ends with a Pit Stop (Parada) where teams are able to rest and where teams that arrive last are progressively eliminated from the race until only three remain. In some legs, the first teams to arrive at the Pit Stop win prizes, usually from the show's sponsors.

In this version, airports are treated like Pit Stops. Teams arrive at the airport and, in lieu of finding a flight, write down the time that they arrived at the airport. They will then be released from the destination's airport with the same time gaps.

- Pase Directo/Passe Direto (The Express Pass): Introduced in season 3; It is awarded to the winner of the first leg of the race. The Express Pass allows that team to skip any task they want during the race.

==== Non-elimination legs ====
Each race has a number of predetermined non-elimination legs, in which the last team to arrive at the Pit Stop is not eliminated and is allowed to continue on the race. The non-eliminated team is required to do a Speed Bump sometime during the next leg.

- Multa (Speed Bump): A task that only the team saved from elimination on the previous leg must complete before continuing on.

==== Double-length legs ====
On all seasons, the season finale has always had 2 legs, with the final 3 teams instructed to go to the Pit Stop. The first team to arrive in seasons 1, 4 and 5 got a prize and their next clue to the final destination city and the last team did not get a penalty. (there was no prize for the first team on seasons 2 and 3).

==== No-rest legs ====
Introduced in season 3, no-rest legs were introduced as similar to the eighteenth season of the American version, with the first team to arrive winning a prize and their next clue, and the last team having to complete a Speed Bump on the following leg.

=== Rules and Penalties ===
Most of the rules and penalties are adopted directly from the American edition; but in some cases, the Latin American version has been seen to have a unique set of additional rules.

==== Rules ====
- A key difference from other versions of The Amazing Race franchise is that, one team may not Yield or U-Turn another team if both teams are within each other's lines of sight.

== Seasons ==
The show first aired in 2009 with the first season premiere airing on 20 September 2009 and ending on 13 December 2009. The six seasons have aired yearly, with the first episode airing in mid/late September and the last one airing in mid/late December. Season 6 was the last to air, and there has been no news since of any further seasons.

#	Broadcast		Winners	Teams	Host
#	Premiere date	Finale date	Winners	Teams	Host
1	20 September 2009	13 December 2009	Argentina: Matías Franchini & Tamara Reichelt	11	Harris Whitbeck
2	26 September 2010	19 December 2010	Mexico: Mauricio & Carlos Coarasa	11	Harris Whitbeck
3	25 September 2011	18 December 2011	Chile: Cristóbal & Nicolás Brain	11	Harris Whitbeck
4	7 October 2012	23 December 2012	Brazil: Daniel Belém & César Curti	11	Paulo Zulu
5	16 September 2013	9 December 2013	Argentina: Ezequiel Sapochnik & Tobías de la Barra	11	Toya Montoya
6	5 October 2014	28 December 2014	Ecuador: Juan Carlos Estrada & Giovanni López	11	Toya Montoya & Jaime Arellano

== Rankings ==
Country	Season 1	Season 2	Season 3	Season 4	Season 5	Season 6
Argentina	Winner / 11th	3rd	3rd / 11th		Winner / 3rd	2nd / 8th
Brazil	4th / 5th	4th		All	9th	
Chile	3rd	10th	Winner			6th
Colombia	7th / 8th	5th / 6th	2nd / 5th		6th / 7th	5th / 7th
Costa Rica			6th		4th	
Dominican Republic		8th				
Ecuador			8th			Winner / 4th
Guatemala					8th	
Mexico	6th / 10th	Winner / 2nd / 7th	4th / 9th		8th / 11th	3rd / 9th
Panama	9th					
Peru		11th	7th			
Uruguay					2nd	
Venezuela	2nd	9th	10th		5th / 10th	10th / 11th

indicates the winning country.
indicates the runner-up country.
indicates the third-place country.
indicates the country did not participate.

Notes:

Mexico is also the runner-up in this season.
All the teams in the fourth season are from Brazil.
Juanjo & Beto are the first binational team, representing both Guatemala and Mexico.
Argentina is also the 3rd place in this season.

Country	Winner	Runner-up	Third-place	Total
Argentina	2	1	3	6
Brazil	1	1	1	3
Mexico	1	1	1	3
Chile	1	0	1	2
Ecuador	1	0	0	1
Colombia	0	1	0	1
Uruguay	0	1	0	1
Venezuela	0	1	0	1
Costa Rica	0	0	0	0
Dominican Republic	0	0	0	0
Guatemala	0	0	0	0
Panama	0	0	0	0
Peru	0	0	0	0

== Countries and locales visited ==
As of the sixth season, the Latin American version of The Amazing Race has visited 15 countries and has visited only the Americas (except Canada and the United States).

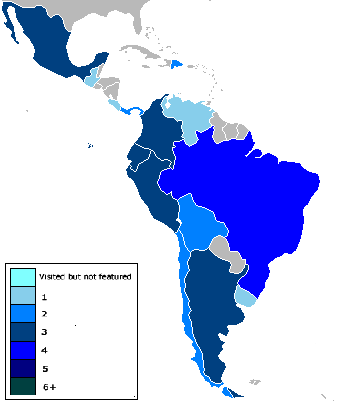
Countries that The Amazing Race has visited are shown in colour.

=== North America ===
Rank	Country	Season visited	Pit Stops
1	Mexico	3 (1, 2, 5)	7
2	Dominican Republic	2 (1, 5)	3
2	Panama	2 (1, 5)	3
4	Costa Rica	1 (1)	1
4	Curaçao (Note: Curaçao is a constituent country of the Kingdom of the Netherlands)	1 (5)	1
4	Guatemala	1 (2)	1

=== South America ===
Rank	Country	Season visited	Pit Stops
1	Brazil	4 (1, 2, 3, 4)	12
2	Argentina	3 (1, 2, 3)	7
2	Colombia	3 (1, 2, 5)	7
2	Ecuador	3 (2, 3, 6)	15
2	Peru	3 (1, 4, 5)	6
5	Bolivia	2 (2, 4)	3
5	Chile	2 (1, 3)	4
7	Uruguay	1 (3)	2
7	Venezuela	1 (2)	1
