= Harris Whitbeck =

Guatemalan journalist, author and television personality

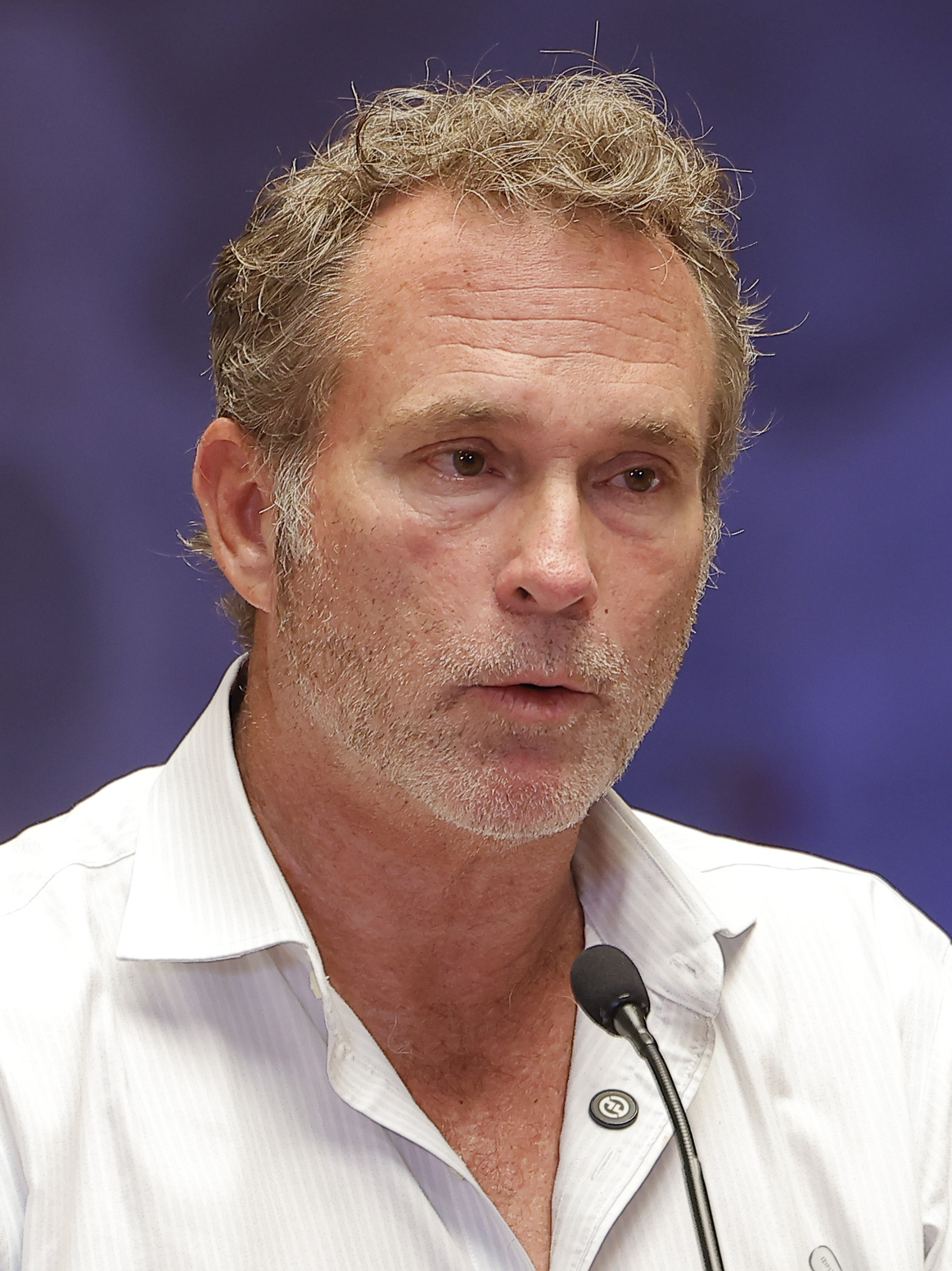
- Whitbeck in 2025

Director of the Guatemalan Institute of Tourism
- Incumbent
- Assumed office 18 January 2024
- President: Bernardo Arévalo
- Preceded by: Anayansy Rodríguez

Personal details
- Born: Harris Lee Whitbeck Cain; 25 May 1965 (age 61) Guatemala
- Education: Washington College; Columbia University
- Occupation: Journalist, War correspondent, Television presenter
- Awards: National Headliner Award, Global Media Award, Environmentalist Media Award

Harris Lee Whitbeck Cain (born 1965 in Guatemala City, Guatemala) is a Guatemalan journalist, author, and television personality currently serving as the director of the Guatemalan Institute of Tourism (INGUAT) for the Bernardo Arévalo administration. Prior to becoming the director of INGUAT, Whitbeck worked as a correspondent and Latin America bureau chief for CNN.

== Career ==
=== Journalism ===
He was CNN's International Correspondent based in Mexico City, Mexico. He covered key events in Latin America and around the world for CNN Worldwide, including CNN International, CNN en Español, and CNN/U.S. Since he has written for CGTN America and the Al Jazeera Media Network.

Since joining CNN in 1991, Whitbeck has reported on worldwide events, including the war in Iraq and its aftermath, the U.S.-led war against the Taliban in Afghanistan, the 2004 Haitian coup d'état, the rebellion in Chiapas, several papal visits to Latin America, and the hostage crisis at the Japanese embassy in Lima. He also covered September 11's terrorist attack against The Pentagon in Washington, D.C. He reported extensively from Turkey and Jordan before the illegal invasion of Iraq, and most recently, he reported post-war events from Iraq, where he was part of the team of reporters who first broke the news of the death of Saddam Hussein's sons.

In Latin America, Whitbeck has covered important political, economic, and social developments, as well as numerous devastations caused by natural disasters. Among those, Whitbeck covered floods in Venezuela, the earthquake in Colombia, and the destruction left by Hurricane Mitch. On the political side, Whitbeck reported on the presidential elections in Mexico, Peru, and Argentina, the Augusto Pinochet extradition process, the coup attempt in Ecuador, the death of Octavio Paz, and Bill Clinton's trip to Latin America in May 1997. He also reported on the Latin American Summit from Monterrey, Mexico.

Whitbeck has received various journalism accolades, such as the National Headliner Award for coverage of the Ciudad Juárez killings in 1999 and two others for his special report on the presence of Middle Eastern terror organizations in South America's Triple Borders region, Argentina, comprising Brazil and Paraguay in 2001. He won the Global Media Award from the Population Institute and the Environmentalist Media Award from the Association of Environmental Media. He also received a special Emmy recognition for his journalistic achievements. In addition, Whitbeck was selected as one of the 12 leaders in the International Journalism category for 2001 by Guatemala's Business Council.

=== Television ===
Whitbeck was the host of the first three seasons of the Latin American version of the reality show The Amazing Race. The first two seasons aired on Discovery Channel Latin America. The third season aired on September 25, 2011, on Space.

=== Projects ===
Whitbeck spearheaded a project called "Pintando Santa Catarina Palopó" in Santa Catarina Palopó, located on Lake Atitlán. The project has received international attention for sparking development and local job opportunities when residents painted the town's buildings in vibrant hues.

== Education ==
A native of Guatemala, Whitbeck holds a bachelor's degree in international studies from Washington College in Chestertown, Maryland, and a master's degree in journalism from Columbia University in New York City. He is fluent in English, French, and Spanish.

== Personal life ==
Whitbeck is the son of Harris Whitbeck Sr., a notable Guatemalan businessman.
