= Uzma Aslam Khan =

Pakistani writer

- عظمیٰ اسلم خان
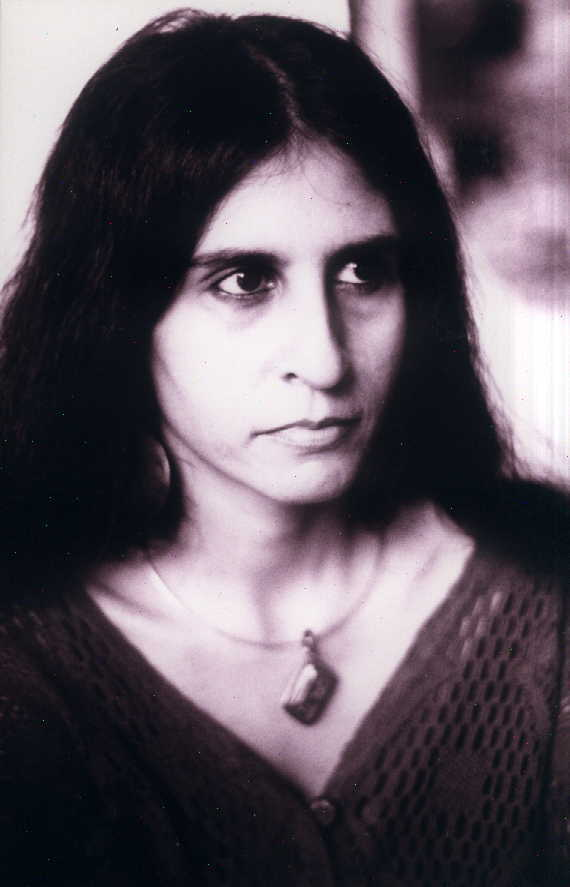
- Born: Lahore, Pakistan
- Education: St Joseph's Convent School, Karachi; St Patrick's High School, Karachi
- Alma mater: Hobart and William Smith Colleges (BA); University of Arizona (MFA)
- Writing career
- Notable works: The Story of Noble Rot; Trespassing; The Geometry of God; Thinner than Skin; The Miraculous True History of Nomi Ali
- Website: www.uzmaaslamkhan.com

Uzma Aslam Khan is a Pakistani writer. Her five novels include Trespassing (2003), The Geometry of God (2008), Thinner Than Skin (2012) and The Miraculous True History of Nomi Ali (2019).

== Personal life ==
Khan was born in Lahore and raised largely in Karachi, though her earliest years were spent in Manila, Tokyo, and London. Her parents migrated as refugees to Pakistan after the partition of India and she describes her childhood as "forcibly uprooted and happily nomadic." Her family resettled in Pakistan shortly before the country's military dictator, General Zia, declared martial law—she has said that these changes, personal and political, were her "transition from childhood to adulthood." She received a scholarship to study at Hobart and William Smith Colleges, New York, from where she obtained a BA in Comparative Literature, and obtained an MFA from the University of Arizona, Tucson, US.

== Career ==
=== Novelist ===
Khan's first novel, The Story of Noble Rot, was published by Penguin Books India in 2001, and reissued by Rupa & Co. in 2009.

Her second novel, Trespassing, was published simultaneously by Flamingo/HarperCollins in the UK and Penguin Books India in 2003. It has been translated into fourteen languages in eighteen countries. Set in the 1990s during the aftermaths of the Afghan War and Gulf War and completed a few months before 9/11, the book has been called "prescient" for how it illustrates the dark and troubled context of the west's involvement in the east and a precursor to the post-9/11 fiction from Pakistan that was to come. As Khan puts it "So much of this book is about history coming back to haunt you." Writing for Outlook magazine, Nilanjana S. Roy wrote that "While Khan's prose may be subtle, her style is as forceful as any of the great storytellers... Khan is creating a tradition and style of her own as a writer." Trespassing was shortlisted for the 2003 Commonwealth Writers' Prize, Eurasia region.

Khan's third novel, The Geometry of God, was printed by Rupa & Co. India in 2008. It tells the story of Amal, who, as a child, accidentally discovers the fossil of the ear of the first whale – or 'dog-whale', as she calls it – while on a dig with her paleontologist grandfather. Despite the pressures imposed on her by her family, and by society, Amal goes on to become the first woman paleontologist to work with men in the mountains of Pakistan to look for fossils of ancient whales. The novel was praised for boldly charting new territory, and for its characters. Khan was becoming recognized for her frank exploration of sexuality, unique in Pakistani English-language writing.

Following its release in India, The Geometry of God was published in Spain, Italy, France, the US, the UK, and Pakistan. It won the Bronze Award for multicultural fiction in the Independent Publisher Book Awards, 2010; was selected as one of Kirkus Reviews' Best Books of 2009; and was a finalist of Foreword magazine's Best Books of 2009.

Khan's fourth novel, Thinner than Skin, was published in 2012 in the US, and subsequently in Canada, India, France, Turkey, UK, and Pakistan, and is slated for release in Egypt in 2021. It was nominated for the Man Asian Literary Prize, the DSC Prize for South Asian Literature, and won the inaugural KLF-Embassy of France Fiction Prize at the Karachi Literature Festival (KLF) in February 2014. In a joint statement, the jury explained its choice for selecting Khan's book for "The eloquent and elegant way in which she reveals a myriad of different worlds with masterly restraint. The novel animates mountains, lakes, wind and fire and other elements of nature that echo the complex emotions of her characters. Through the carefully structured plot and the well-wrought patterns of recurring images and incidents, emerge insights about homeland, belonging and dislocation, central to contemporary Pakistani life."

Her fifth novel, The Miraculous True History of Nomi Ali , set in the Andaman Islands preceding and during the Second World War, when the islands were a British penal colony seized by the Japanese, was released in India and Pakistan in 2019 and 2020, respectively. The novel received critical praise for its lyrical prose, and for being a "vibrant defiance of traditionally accepted histories ... (focusing instead) on marginalised and forgotten lives that history would rather ignore, creating a brilliant gash in the narrative structure historically manufactured." For its reconstruction of a time and place never before written in English-language fiction, it has been called a record in itself Author Pankaj Mishra has said: "The Miraculous True History of Nomi Ali brilliantly excavates a forgotten past of several societies and honours its human complexity with a narrative of delicate precision. As affecting as it is intellectually powerful, the novel is a master lesson in the art of historical fiction" and author Mohammed Hanif, called it "A glorious novel about a forgotten place and a part of our history that we hardly ever talk about." The Miraculous True History of Nomi Ali was shortlisted for the TATA Literature Live! Best Book of the Year Award for Fiction 2019. and won the 9th UBL Literary Awards 2020 Best English Fiction category. It also won the Karachi Literature Festival Getz-Pharma Fiction Prize 2021. The Miraculous True History of Nomi Ali was released in Sweden in 2021, and in the US and UK in May and June 2022, respectively. It was a "New York Times"' "Best Historical Fiction 2022" and a New York Times' "Books for Summer 2022.". It won the 2023 Massachusetts Book Awards in Fiction.

=== Other writing ===
Khan's fiction has also appeared in numerous anthologies, including "Now Pray: Notes on a Separation" in AGNI (magazine) #92 in October 2020, described as a "landmark work that deals at least in part with the global Sars-Cov-2 pandemic and our tumultuous times"; "The Origin of Sweetness" in Desi Delicacies: Food Writing from Muslim South Asia in December 2020; "The News at His Back" (an extract from Thinner Than Skin) in The Massachusetts Review. "Ice, Mating" in Granta magazine's highly popular edition on Pakistan; and "Look, But With Love" (an extract from Trespassing) in And the World Changed: Contemporary Stories by Pakistani Women (The Feminist Press). Her short story "My Mother is a Lunar Crater" won second prize in the twenty-second annual Zoetrope: All Story Short Fiction Competition in 2018, judged by Colum McCann, who called it "a classic story—beautifully crafted, smart, engaging, and shot through with depth and nuance. It does what the best stories do: it gives us imaginative access to a human moment, and a time that might otherwise pass us by". The following year, her story "Plum Island" won first prize in Zoetrope: All Story Short Fiction Competition 2019, judged by Tommy Orange. Khan is the first repeat prize winner in the magazine's history. Khan's story "Our Own Fantastic" won second prize in Australian Book Review's 2023 Elizabeth Jolley Short Story Prize.

== Published works ==
- The Story of Noble Rot (Penguin India, 2001. Reissued by Rupa & Co. in 2009) ISBN 9780141005676
- Trespassing (Flamingo/HarperCollins UK, 2003. Metropolitan/Henry Holt and Company USA, 2004) ISBN 9780007152773
- The Geometry of God (Clockroot Books/Interlink Publishing USA, 2009. Haus Publishing UK, 2010) ISBN 9781566567749
- Thinner than Skin (Clockroot Books/Interlink USA, HarperCollins Canada, HarperCollins India, Jacaranda Books UK 2012) ISBN 9781566569088
- The Miraculous True History of Nomi Ali (Westland India, 2019) ISBN 9789388689465, Deep Vellum Publishing USA, 2022 ISBN 9781646051649

== Awards and nominations ==
- 2003 Trespassing was shortlisted for the Commonwealth Prize, Eurasia region.
- 2009 The Geometry of God was selected as one of Kirkus Reviews' Best Books.
- 2009 The Geometry of God was a finalist of Foreword magazine's Best Books.
- 2010 The Geometry of God won the Bronze Award in the Independent Publisher Book Awards.
- 2012 Thinner Than Skin was longlisted for the Man Asian Literary Prize.
- 2014 Thinner Than Skin was longlisted for the DSC Prize for South Asian Literature.
- 2014 Thinner Than Skin won the inaugural KLF-Embassy of France Best Fiction Prize.
- 2019 The Miraculous True History of Nomi Ali was shortlisted for the TATA Literature Live! Book of the Year Award.
- 2020 The Miraculous True History of Nomi Ali won the 9th UBL Literary Awards 2020 Best English Fiction category.
- 2021 The Miraculous True History of Nomi Ali won the Karachi Literature Festival-Getz-Pharma Fiction Prize.
- 2023 The Miraculous True History of Nomi Ali was a 2022 Foreword Reviews' INDIES finalist in Historical Fiction.
- 2023 The Miraculous True History of Nomi Ali won the 2023 Mass Book Award in Fiction.
