= Marie Thérèse Haze =

Belgian Roman Catholic professed religious

Blessed Marie-Thérèse Haze
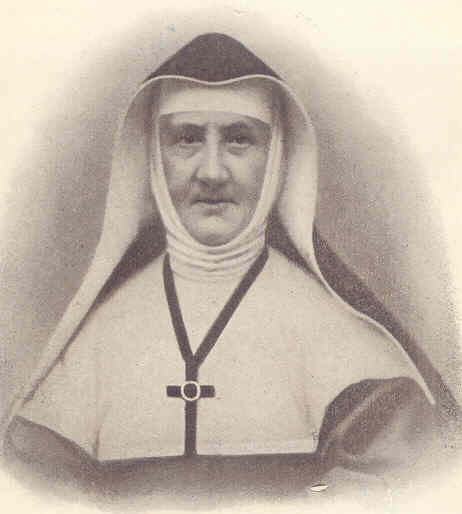

Religious
- Born: 27 February 1782; Liége, Prince-bishopric of Liège, Holy Roman Empire
- Died: 7 January 1876 (aged 93); Liége, Belgium
- Venerated in: Roman Catholic Church
- Beatified: 21 April 1991, Saint Peter's Square, Vatican City by Pope John Paul II
- Feast: 7 January
- Patronage: Daughters of the Cross

Jeanne Haze (27 February 1782 – 7 January 1876), also known by her religious name Marie-Thérèse of the Sacred Heart of Jesus, was a Belgian Roman Catholic professed religious and the foundress of the Daughters of the Cross. Haze decided to respond to the lack of education in her homeland in the chaos resulting from the French Revolution and made that the focus of her religious apostolate; she served as her order's Superior General from its founding until her death.

Her beatification cause opened in 1911 under Pope Pius X while Pope Pius XII later titled her as Venerable in 1941; Pope John Paul II beatified her in 1991.

== Life ==
Jeanne Haze was born in Liége in 1782 as one of seven children. Her father served as the aide to the Prince-bishop who ruled the area. Once the French forces occupied the Low Countries in 1794 her father decided to move himself and his relations to the German Empire for safe haven where he would die.

In her childhood she developed and cultivated a strong devotion to the Passion of Christ. At age four she could read and write. Once peace had been established their return to Belgium was assured but their experiences had left Haze and her sister Ferdinande with a strong empathetic spirit to the sufferings of the neediest people. Their mother died in 1820 and the two sisters felt called to enter a religious order though the anti-monastic laws then in effect under the United Kingdom of the Netherlands prevented that from occurring. Instead the sisters decided to follow a religious form of life in their own home and opened a small school in 1824 to support themselves.

In 1829 the local pastor – the Canon Cloes who was the Dean of the Collegiate Church of Saint Bartholomew – asked their help in educating the girls of the area who were suffering from the lack of schooling then widespread as a consequence of the occupation. The sisters accepted the challenge and opened a free school in the home of the curate of the parish Canon Jean-Guillaume Habets. The declaration of independence leading to the creation of the Kingdom of Belgium allowed the sisters to establish the school as a Christian institution.

Haze and her sister shared their vision of establishing a religious order on multiple occasions with Habets though the latter would be reluctant to discuss this to the point of avoiding them at times. Nonetheless – in the course of a diocesan visit to the school – the diocesan bishop Cornelius van Bommel was pleased with the idea and shared the sisters' aspirations. The bishop approved of this project and instructed Habets to write the foundational documents for a new order. The Rule drawn up based on that of the Jesuits in 1832 and on 8 September 1833 – in the Carmelite church next to their school – Haze was allowed to profess permanent religious vows while taking the religious name of "Marie Thérèse of the Sacred Heart of Jesus" as was Ferdinande under the name of "Aloysia" and two other companions. Two of their companions professed initial vows and the remainder of the group began a formal novitiate. Thus the congregation was born and she was chosen its first Superior (in this post until her death).

Haze died in 1876; her remains were later housed in the chapel at the order's motherhouse on 21 April 1993 after the place was renovated to accommodate this transferral. In 2005 her order had 857 religious in 115 houses in nations such as Pakistan and the United Kingdom. It received the papal decree of praise from Pope Gregory XVI on 1 October 1845 and full pontifical approval from Pope Pius XII on 9 May 1951.

== Beatification ==
The beatification process opened in Belgium in a local investigative process that spanned from 1902 until 1905. Her spiritual writings received theological approval on 23 February 1910. Her cause was formally opened on 13 December 1911, granting her the title of Servant of God. The Congregation for Rites validated the informative process on 26 June 1923 in Rome. An antepreparatory committee approved the cause on 1 July 1937 as did the preparatory one on 30 May 1939 and the general one on 10 December 1940.

Pope Pius XII titled Haze as Venerable on 9 February 1941 after confirming her heroic virtue. Pope John Paul II beatified her on 21 April 1991.

== See also ==
- Daughters of the Cross
