= Bernadette Louise Dean =

Pakistani academic and educator

- Born: Mirpur, Azad Kashmir, Pakistan
- Education: University of Alberta (Ph.D.)
- Occupations: Academic, educator
- Employer: University of Central Asia
- Known for: Principal of Kinnaird College, Lahore
- Board member of: St. Patrick's College (Karachi); Founder Member, Association of Social Studies Educators and Teachers; Founder Member, South Asian Forum for Education Development
- Awards: Civic Educator Award 2008

Bernadette Louise Dean is a Pakistani academic and educator, of Portuguese and Anglo-Indian descent. Formerly the principal of two women's colleges in Pakistan and a participant in revising Pakistan's national curriculum, she was accused of being a foreigner and forced to leave the country in 2015 by death threats from Islamic extremists after being accused of working to secularize school textbooks. She has since become an academic administrator at the University of Central Asia.

== Education ==
Of Anglo-Indian descent, Dean was born and raised in Pakistan. She did her schooling at St. Lawrence’s Girls School, Karachi and then studied at St. Joseph's College, Karachi. She completed an M.Sc (Psychology) at the University of Karachi, and earned her M.Ed (Teacher Education) from the Aga Khan University's Institute for Educational Development. She later earned a Ph.D. in education in 2000 from the University of Alberta, Canada. Her dissertation, Islam, Democracy and Social Studies Education: A Quest for Possibilities, was supervised by Terry Carson.

== Career ==
In 1983, Dean was working as a social worker in Pakistan's only clinic for heroin addicts. She joined the Aga Khan University Institute for Educational Development in 1996. She was promoted to the rank of assistant professor at the university in 2000. By 2008 she was an associate professor, and head of academic and student affairs at the university. In December 2008, she was awarded the Centre for Civic Education Pakistan’s Civic Educator Award 2008.

In 2009, Dean was appointed as the principal of Kinnaird College in Lahore, a prestigious women's institution in Pakistan. She resigned in 2010, to become principal of St. Joseph’s College for Women. At St. Joseph’s Dean introduced a computer science programme for intermediate students and a four-year BBA programme. In 2014, she left St. Joseph's College to join the VM Institute for Education, Karachi, as its director.

In early 2015, Dean was a member of the advisory committee on curriculum and textbook reform and the Sindh Textbook Board when Muslim religious leaders from the Punjab and Sindh began complaining about her work, accusing her of being a foreigner who was writing curricula and textbooks that were secular and against Islam. She was denounced at the April All-Parties Conference at the Karachi Press Club organized by the Jamaat-e-Islami and its student wing, the Islami Jamiat Talaba. In May, she received phone calls threatening her life and she fled the country.

After leaving Pakistan, Dean became the associate dean for arts and sciences at the University of Central Asia, an international university with campuses in the Kyrgyz Republic, Tajikistan, and Kazakhstan.
