= St Joseph's Convent Grammar School, Donaghmore =

Coordinates: 54.531°N 6.817°W

St. Joseph's Convent Grammar School, Donaghmore Scoil Ghramadaí Naomh Iósaef, Domhnach Mor

Location
- 58 Castlecaulfield Rd, Dungannon, BT70 3HE; Northern Ireland

Information
- Type: Grammar School
- Religious affiliation: Roman Catholic
- Local authority: Education Authority (Western)
- Principal: Geraldine Donnelly
- Staff: 60 approx.
- Gender: Co-educational
- Age: 11 to 18
- Enrollment: 900
- Colour
- Website: www.stjosephs.donaghmore.ni.sch.uk

St Joseph's Grammar School (Irish: Scoil Ghramadaí Naomh Iósaef), sometimes known colloquially as Donaghmore Convent, the Convent or SJS, is a Catholic school in Donaghmore, County Tyrone which caters for 900 pupils aged between 11 and 18.

== History ==
It was founded by the Daughters of the Cross originally from Belgium, who had been active in Britain and Ireland since 1869. Canon Joseph O’Neill of Donaghmore invited the order to establish a convent and school in 1920. Miss Frances Ellis, a great benefactress of the Daughters of the Cross, donated the then-significant sum of £987 for the school at the time of its foundation. It was an all-girls school, until 2003, when it became co-ed. In 2007 the religious sisters left the school and it is now entirely staffed by lay teachers.

In March 2023, St. Joseph's Grammar School won the All-Ireland Paddy Drummond Cup, a Gaelic football schools competition, for the first time in their history. They defeated The Abbey School from County Tipperary in the final, with the final score being 2-12 (18) - 0-09 (9). The final was played in County Mayo.

== Academics ==
In 2018, 92.8% of its entrants achieved five or more GCSEs at grades A* to C, including the core subjects English and Maths.

86.1% of its A-level students who sat the exams in 2017/18 were awarded three A*-C grades.
