= Saint Joseph's College for Women, Karachi =

College in Karachi, Pakistan

Saint Joseph's College for Women
- Motto: Loquentes Magnalia Dei
- Motto in English: Speaking the wonderful works of God
- Type: Private
- Established: 1948
- Religious affiliation: Roman Catholic; Daughters of the Holy Cross
- Academic affiliations: Catholic Board of Education
- Principal: Sr.Julie Pacheco F.C
- Location: Karachi, Pakistan; 24.86041°N 67.03400°E
- Website: www.stjosephscollege.edu.pk

Saint Joseph's College for Women is located in Karachi, Sindh, Pakistan. It is a college for women, owned by the Roman Catholic Archdiocese of Karachi.

== History ==
It was established by the religious order, the Daughters of the Cross and is one of the most distinguished women's colleges in the country. It was founded in 1948 and was one of the first colleges for women in Karachi.

The building was constructed by Brother Hilary Lardenoye OFM. Since 1951, it has been affiliated with the University of Karachi. It began as an Arts college with the Science faculty added later in 1950.

== Recent events ==
The college was nationalised in 1972 and denationalised in 2005, and returned to the Catholic Board of Education. On the 23 March 2009, the Government of Pakistan awarded the college principal, Sister Mary Emily FC the Sitara-e-Imtiaz, which she received from the Governor of Sindh. This was in recognition of her services to education.

The college offers subjects in science, commerce and arts education at the Intermediate and baccalaureate levels. In 2011, St. Joseph's College started education of computer sciences at the intermediate level.

== Principals ==
List of Principals of Saint Joseph's College
#	Principal	Tenure
1	Sr. Mary Alban, FC	1948–1951
2	Sr. Mary Bernadette, FC	1951–1961
3	Sr. Mary Emily Gonsalves, FC	1961–1982
4	Mrs. Bilquis Ifikhar	1982–1983
5	Mrs. Munira Gulzar	1983–1993
6	Mrs. Kaniz J. Abedi	1993–1999
7	Mrs. Shahnaz Parveen	1999–2000
8	Dr. Tanveer Anjum, PhD	2000–2005
9	Sr. Mary Emily Gonsalves, FC	2005–2008
10	Ms. Mary Caleb	2009–2010
11	Dr. Bernadette Louise Dean, PhD	2010–2013
12	Sr. Roohi Ghouri, FC	2013–2021
13	Sr. Julie Pouch	2021-present

== Alumnae ==
- Naz Baloch, Pakistani politician from Karachi and Central Vice President of Pakistan Tehreek-e-Insaf
- Bernadette Louise Dean, Principal 2010 – 2013
- Yolande Henderson, former headmistress of the St Patrick's High School O’ Levels section
- Mehreen Jabbar, film and television director and producer
- Shahida Jamil, former Minister for Law & Parliamentary Affairs
- Dail Jones (born 1944), New Zealand politician
- Fauzia Kasuri, President of Women's wing in Pakistan Tehreek-e-Insaf
- Sehba Musharraf, former First Lady of Pakistan
- Hamida Khuhro, former Sindh Minister for Education
- Zubeida Mustafa, journalist
