= Zubeida Mustafa =

Pakistani journalist (1941–2025)

- زبیدہ مصطفی
- Mustafa in 2012
- Born: 1941; British India
- Died: 9 July 2025 (aged 84); Karachi, Sindh, Pakistan
- Occupation: Freelance journalist
- Awards: Lifetime Achievement Award by the International Women's Media Foundation in 2012 * Women Leaders Award in 2020 by the President of Pakistan * Global Media Award for Journalistic Excellence by the Population Institute in Washington D.C. for her research in population control (1986 and 2004)

Zubeida Mustafa (Urdu: زبیدہ مصطفی; 1941 – 9 July 2025) was a Pakistani freelance journalist who became one of the first women to work in the country's mainstream media, when she joined the Dawn newspaper in 1975.

== Early life ==
Born in British India, Mustafa moved to Pakistan with her family after the independence of Pakistan. She was married and had two daughters.

== Education ==
Mustafa completed her BA and then her MA in International Relations at the University of Karachi. She also studied at the London School of Economics under a Commonwealth Scholarship.

== Career ==
Mustafa joined the staff of the Dawn newspaper, Pakistan's leading English-language daily in July 1975 as assistant editor. She was the only woman at Dawn at a senior-level position and also was the first woman writer in the mainstream media in Pakistan. During that time, she covered women's issues concerning health and human rights. She used her perspective as a woman to write editorials promoting international peace and pleading for social justice.

As a female journalist, Mustafa stated that the injustices Pakistani women suffer "touches her deeply". According to a 2012 Newsline magazine profile, she mentioned how important it is for women to seize the opportunities given to them. Though women's issues were her main beat, she also focused on education, human empowerment, health and population. She stated that focusing on education was important since the root of problems in Pakistan was the country's failure to educate its citizens, especially to have awareness of health issues.

According to Newsline, Mustafa considered longtime editor of Dawn newspaper, Ahmed Ali Khan, her mentor who taught her how to "bottle a river in a tumbler (darya ko koozay mein band karna) and how to look at a problem from the people's point of view and to never be unfair in one's writing".

In 1986, Mustafa was awarded the Global Media Award for Excellence by The Population Institute in Washington D.C. for her research and writings on population control in Pakistan.

In 2012, Mustafa was awarded a Lifetime Achievement Award by the International Women's Media Foundation for her news coverage on women's issues, politics, education, and health and culture. In 2013, the Women Media Center awarded her for her contributions to journalism in Pakistan.

Mustafa was not very fond of the current or past Pakistani political leaders. According to her interview to Newsline in 2012, she observed that Pakistanis have "a bunch of power-hungry leaders who are not statesmen by any yardstick. They are selfish, corrupt and ignorant. They have no strategy to resolve the current crisis nor do they want to".

Mustafa retired from her job as a journalist after 33 years of service in 2009 due to some personal health issues. In 2012, she was still facing some health issues including her failing eyesight. As of 2020, she continued to write her newspaper columns as a freelance journalist.

== Death ==
Mustafa died in Karachi on 9 July 2025, after a months-long struggle with illness. She was 84.

== Awards and recognition ==
- Global Media Award for Excellence (1986 and 2004) by The Population Institute, Washington D.C. for her research on population control
- Pakistan Publishers and Booksellers Association (2005) for her contribution in the publication of the literary supplement Books & Authors
- Lifetime Achievement Award (2012) by International Women's Media Foundation (IWMF)
- Women Leaders Award by the President of Pakistan in 2020

Dawn Media Group has set up an award for women journalists in her name, the Zubeida Mustafa Award for Journalistic Excellence.

== Books ==
- Mustafa, Zubeida (2008). My DAWN Years: Exploring Social Issues (her autobiography about changes she saw in the press in Pakistan over three decades)
- Mustafa, Zubeida (2021). Reforming School Education in Pakistan & the Language Dilemma. Paramount Books ISBN 978-969-210-234-6
