= Treo Pro =

2009 Windows Mobile smartphone by Palm

Treo Pro (850w)
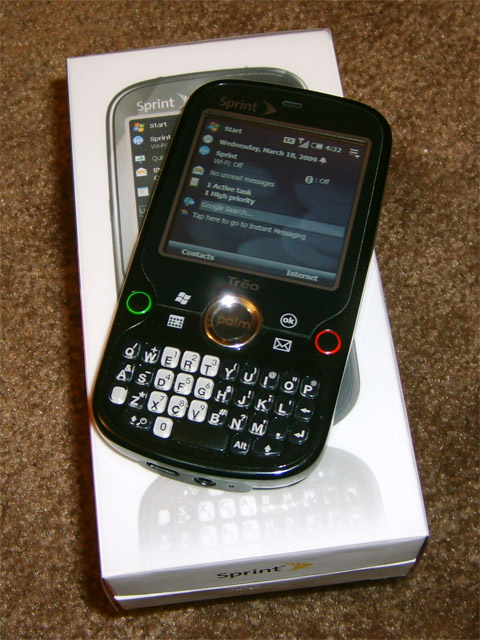
- Manufacturer: Palm, Inc.
- Type: Candybar smartphone
- Released: January 5, 2009
- Operating system: Windows Mobile 6.1 Professional
- CPU: CDMA version: 528 MHz Qualcomm MSM7501A ARM11; GSM version: 400 MHz Qualcomm MSM7201 ARM11
- Memory: 128 MB DRAM
- Storage: Flash memory: 512 MB (CDMA version) or 256 MB (GSM version) microSDHC slot: supports up to 32 GB
- Display: 320 x 320 px, 3.5 in (89 mm), 65,536 color LCD
- Input: Keyboard
- Camera: 2 megapixel camera with 8x digital zoom
- Connectivity: Wi-Fi (802.11b/g), Bluetooth 2.0+EDR, MicroUSB, A-GPS; CDMA version includes: Dual band CDMA2000/EV-DO Rev. A 800 1900 MHz; GSM version includes: Quad band GSM 850 900 1800 1900 MHz GPRS/EDGE and Tri band UMTS/HSDPA 850, 1900, 2100 MHz
- Power: 3.7 V 1500 mAh; Internal rechargeable removable lithium-ion battery
- Dimensions: 4.49 in (114 mm) (h); 2.36 in (60 mm) (w); 0.53 in (13 mm) (d)
- Weight: 4.69 oz (133 g)

The Palm Treo Pro is a combination PDA/cell phone offered in both GSM and CDMA. It is Palm's fourth Windows Mobile Treo. It replaced the short-lived Sprint Treo 800w.

== Specifications ==
The phone originally was released in an unlocked GSM format. The updated release of the phone for CDMA networks featured new hardware specifications, including a more powerful processor, more storage, and less user-available RAM.

- Mobile phone, CDMA model with 800/1900 MHz bands, with EV-DO Rev.A data. Unlocked GSM model also available
- Built-in GPS with both Assisted and Standalone modes
- Qualcomm Dual-Core MSM7501A at 528 MHz processor (400 MHz Qualcomm on GSM networks)
- 300 MB user-available non-volatile storage (105 MB on GSM networks)
- 128 MB DDR RAM (approximately 65 MB user-available on GSM, 45 MB user-available on CDMA)
- Windows Mobile 6.1 Professional
- 2.36 in (w) x 4.49 in (l) x 0.53 in (d)
- 4.69 ounces
- 320x320 TFT flush touchscreen display
- Supports microSD and microSDHC cards up to 32 GB
- Built-in Bluetooth 2.0 EDR with stereo support
- 2-megapixel digital camera
- Built-in 802.11b/g Wi-Fi
- 1500 mAh rechargeable lithium-ion battery.
- Infrared port
- Current CDMA Firmware: Version 1.04

== Features ==
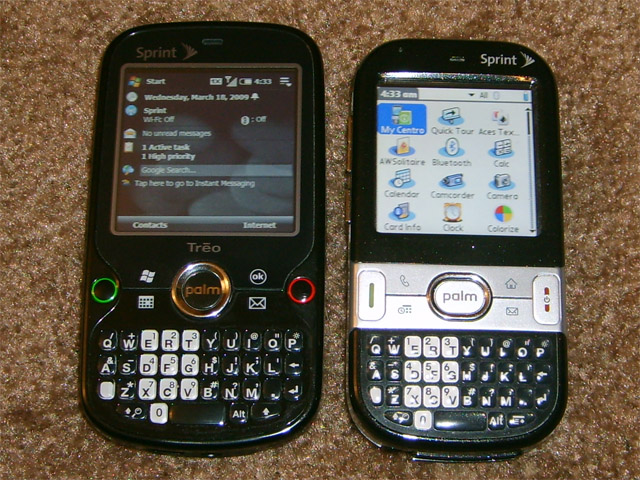
The Palm Treo Pro sporting Windows Mobile Professional 6.1 alongside the Palm Centro using Palm OS Garnet. Both devices show Sprint branding.

The Treo Pro supports A2DP, which allows the user to stream music to a supported device wirelessly over Bluetooth. In addition the device comes with a 3.5 mm standard headphone jack. The GSM version of the phone comes packed with a stereo-headset, while the CDMA phone does not. The battery is removable.

The touchscreen is flush with the surface of the phone, a first in the Palm line of products. The full QWERTY keyboard is in the same style as that of the Palm Centro, with a textured, rubberized feel. It is roughly 10% wider than the Centro's keyboard.

The familiar ringer switch is located, as expected, on the top of the device. It switches the phone from having sounds on to a vibrate-only mode instantly.

== Carriers ==
=== GSM: Vodafone (UK), Telstra (Australia) ===
Vodafone (UK) was the first carrier to officially use the Treo Pro. Also: Telstra (Australia) & Telecom NZ (from May 2009) although the phone is available unlocked as well. M1 (Singapore) began selling the Treo Pro in 2010.

=== CDMA: Bell Mobility & Telus (Canada), Alltel, Sprint Nextel (US) ===
Bell Mobility & Telus in Canada, and Alltel and Sprint Nextel in the US, picked up the Treo Pro in March 2009. The device could also be purchased at list price (about $450) and used on Verizon's network in the US.
