= List of schools in Karachi =

This is a list of notable schools in Karachi, Pakistan.

== Private sector schools ==
=== Boys' schools ===
- Bai Virbaiji Soparivala Parsi High School

=== Girls' schools ===
- Convent of Jesus and Mary (Karachi)
- Mama Parsi Girls Secondary School
- St Joseph's Convent School (Karachi)

=== Co-education schools ===
- DHA Model High School
- Royal City Public School

== Cambridge schools ==
- Habib Public School, M.T Khan Road, Sultanabad
- Karachi Grammar School
- St. Patrick's High School
- The City School
- The Lyceum School, Clifton
