= Daughters of the Cross =

Roman Catholic religious congregation for women

The Daughters of the Cross of Liège (French: Filles de la Croix de Liège) are religious sisters in the Catholic Church who are members of a religious congregation founded in 1833 by Marie Thérèse Haze (1782–1876). The organization's original mission is focused on caring for the needs of their society through education and nursing care.

== History ==
=== Origins ===
The founder, born Jeanne Haze in the Prince-Bishopric of Liège, was forced into exile with her family in Germany when French Revolutionary Army forces occupied her principality. Her father died during that period, leaving the family in poverty.

Her family returned to Liège. After their return, because of their own experiences, Haze and her sister Ferdinande felt drawn to help people in most need. When their mother died in 1820, the sisters wanted to enter a religious community, but were not able to do so due to the restrictions of Church law at the time. In an answer to a request by their pastor, Canon Cloes, the Dean of St Bartholomew Collegiate Church, the sisters opened a school for poor children in the parish in 1829 in the home of the curate of the parish, Canon Jean-Guillaume Habets. The creation of an independent Kingdom of Belgium the following year allowed them to establish the school officially as a Catholic institution.

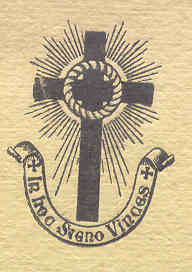
The emblem of the Daughters of the Cross of Liège

Soon other young women joined the pair in their desire to follow the consecrated life. Habets, originally skeptical of their desire, came to support them. He helped the group to write their Constitutions.

On September 8, 1833, the Haze sisters professed perpetual religious vows, receiving the names Mother Marie Thérèse and Mother Aloysia in the Carmelite Church of Potay, next to their own convent. Two other companions, Sisters Clara and Constance, made their temporary vows for one year and two postulants began their novitiate. Thus the Congregation of the Daughters of the Cross was established under a Rule of life based on Ignatian spirituality.

The Daughters of the Cross of Liège took over the administration of a women's prison in 1841 and a house for the rehabilitation of prostitutes the following year. In 1843 they opened a shelter for the homeless, which housed 125 residents.

The congregation was formally approved by Pope Gregory XVI on October 1, 1845, thereby raised to the status of a congregation of pontifical right. By that time the congregation had grown to 84 Sisters who operated 4 schools, with a total enrollment of about 1,000 girls. Of those girls, 80% were given a free education. Their constitutions were approved by Pope Pius IX in 1851. She was the foundress of the school "St. Teresa's Secondary School" in Kidderpore.

=== Expansion ===
The sisters began to serve in other countries with their establishing a foundation in Germany in 1849. At the invitation of the Vicar Apostolic of Bombay, they opened schools in the British Raj in 1861. This led to their working in the United Kingdom in 1863.

==== United States ====
In 1855, Auguste Martin, the Bishop of the Diocese of Natchitoches, Louisiana, held conversations with Mother Mary Hyacinth (1816–1897) of the Daughters of the Cross to ask for missionary workers in Louisiana. Her order was interested in teaching in America. Permission was granted by the Bishop of France for ten nuns to undertake this task. On Oct. 19, 1855, the Daughters of the Cross arrived in Avoyelles Parish. In 1860, John Pierre invited them to Shreveport to found a school next door to Holy Trinity Catholic Church (Shreveport, Louisiana), which remained open until 1954. By 1870, the order had opened six schools in North Louisiana. In totality, 21 schools in the state were established by the Order over the years, including St John Berchmans Catholic School in Shreveport in 1949.

After the Civil War's end in 1866, Pierre advised the order about a parcel of land south of Shreveport that would be an excellent location for a girl's boarding school. Hyacinth then purchased 100 acres and a building. St. Vincent's Academy opened in October, 1868, as a day and boarding school solely for girls. It was accredited to confer high school diplomas and college degrees, as well as to teach first through 12th grades.

The school's enrollment continued to rise until a devastating Yellow fever epidemic in 1873. Subsequent growth was mostly due to the efforts of Napoleon Joseph Roulleaux, who was chaplain of the convent and school. In 1906, a fire destroyed the school but the buildings were rebuilt with a gothic design from clay bricks on the same property. In September, 1962, the academy was transferred to a new site on Fairfield Avenue, where it remained until its closure due to economic struggles at the end of the 1987–88 session, culminating in 119 years of devoted service by the Daughters of the Cross. St. Vincent's Academy declined to consider a merger at the time with Loyola College Prep, which was a local all-male Catholic high school founded by the Jesuits in 1902.

Only a very small number of nuns from the order remain in the Northern Louisiana community. They are retired and are no longer involved in the operations of any of the numerous remaining schools the order founded in the region. The Order of the Daughters of the Cross, overall, now has a very limited and declining active presence in the United States, primarily restricted to ministries of caring for seniors, the sick, dying, and the home bound, which are organized and conducted under the auspices of the United Kingdom province. In 1958, four nuns from the Daughters of the Cross of England had come to Tracy, California to open St. Bernard's School. Over the years their ministry expanded to Angel's Camp, Lockford, Manteca, San Andreas, and Stockton, but having gained no new recruits, they have since left Tracy.

==== United Kingdom ====
Haze sent her sisters to England in 1863. In the United Kingdom, the Daughters of the Cross are constituted as a registered charity. In 2006–7 it had a gross income of £56,197,000, making it one of the 100 largest charities in the United Kingdom. In March 2024 it sold St. Wilfred's Convent in Chelsea for £54 million.

===== Schools =====
- St Philomena's Catholic High School for Girls, Carshalton, Surrey

===== Charities =====
- St Anthony's Hospital, Cheam, Surrey, England
- St Raphael's Hospice, Cheam, Surrey, England
- St Elizabeth's Centre, Much Hadham, Hertfordshire, England. Centre specialising in education and care for individuals of all ages with a range of complex medical and educational needs. Comprises St Elizabeth's School; St Elizabeth's College (post 19) and St Elizabeth's Care Home.
- Holy Cross Hospital, Haslemere, Surrey, England
- St Michael's Hospital, Hayle, Cornwall
- Holy Cross College, Bury, Greater Manchester, England
- St. Joseph's Convent Grammar School, Donaghmore, County Tyrone, Northern Ireland

==== India ====
- St. Joseph's Convent High School, Panchgani, Maharashtra
- St. Joseph's High School, Matigara, West Bengal
- St. Agnes' Convent School, Howrah, West Bengal
- St. Mary's Girls' Higher Secondary School, Gayaganga, West Bengal
- St. Helen's School, Kurseong, West Bengal
- St. Teresa's Secondary School, Kidderpore, West Bengal
- St. Paul's Boarding & Day School, Kidderpore, West Bengal
- St. Joseph's Convent, Bandra, Mumbai, Maharashtra
- Sacred Heart Convent School, Keshwapur, Hubli, Karnataka
- St. Joseph's Primary School, Bandra, Mumbai
- St. Joseph's High School, Bandra, Mumbai
- St. Joseph's Convent International School, Bandra, Mumbai
- St. Joseph's High School, Agripada, Mumbai
- Vimal Miriam Primary School, Anand, Gujarat
- Vimal Miriam High School, Anand, Gujarat
- St. Joseph's Convent School || Rourkela, Odisha
- Nirmala Girls High School, Kainsara, Sundargarh, Odisha
- Daughters of the Cross Convent, Jorethang, South Sikkim.

==== Pakistan ====
- St Joseph's Convent School (Karachi)
- St. Joseph's College (Karachi)

== Current status ==
The congregation opened institutions in the Belgian Congo (1910), in Ireland (1920), in the Netherlands (1924), in Italy (1929) and in Brazil (1953). In 1975 the sisters numbered about 1,500 members, serving in 113 institutions worldwide. By 2009 the membership had been reduced to 833 Sisters, a quarter of whom were Indian.

The General Motherhouse of the congregation was moved from Liège to England in 2012.
