= Population Institute =

American charity

The Population Institute is a non-profit organization based in Washington, D.C., United States.

Global Population Speak Out (GPSO) is its special project. GPSO is designed to boost public discussion of human overpopulation as a key factor in the struggle for sustainable living on Earth.

The project has three stages. First, a pledge letter explaining GPSO is endorsed by a group of high-profile scientists, activists and celebrities. Over the years, endorsers have included scientists such as Paul R. Ehrlich, and Dennis Meadows. The letter is distributed to people interested in human population dynamics, urging them to speak out during the month of February about the growing human population. Scientists, representatives of environmental NGOs, science writers and activists, along with ordinary concerned citizens are targeted. Finally, the recruits are asked to report their project activities back to the GPSO coordinator, who posts them on the GPSO website.

== Background ==
John Feeney, a writer and activist from Boulder, Colorado, United States organized and managed the first Global Population Speak Out in February 2009. He arranged for the GPSO franchise, and future GPSO activities, to be managed by the Population Institute, Washington D.C.

== GPSO 2009 ==
After the letter had been signed by 32 people, GPSO started as a project in the World Wide Web in September 2008. In October the journal Science wrote:

"At a time when some developed nations are paying citizens to bolster flagging birth-rates (Science, 30 June 2006, p. 1894), a grass-roots group of scientists and environmentalists is calling for a new push to limit human numbers".

GPSO is supported by the World Union for Protection of Life (WUPL).

GPSO 2009 received pledges from 216 persons in at least 17 countries. In November 2009 the Population Institute (PI), established since 1969 in Washington D.C., declared its cooperation with GPSO.

In 2009, the Global Population Speak Out was covered in Science, The Christian Science Monitor and The Times Online, among others.

== GPSO 2010 ==
GPSO 2010 increased the number of project endorsers from 32 (in 2009) to 50 in 2010. Under Population Institute's project management, the number of pledgers had also increased from 216 in 2009 to 386.

== GPSO 2011 ==
GPSO 2011 maintained the number of project endorsers at 50. There were 24 women and 26 men, who represented 16 nations, including: Argentina, Australia, Bangladesh, Chile, Ethiopia, Germany, India, Italy, Kenya, Portugal, Singapore, Thailand, Uganda, UK, and the USA. The number of pledgers increased from 386 in 2010 to 1,037 in 2011. Overall, GPSO 2011 achieved participation from individuals from 52 countries.
