= The Amazing Race 5 (Latin American season) =

Season of television series

- Season 5
- Presented by: Toya Montoya
- No. of teams: 11
- Winners: Ezequiel Sapochnik & Tobías de la Barra
- No. of legs: 12
- Distance traveled: 12,600 km (7,800 mi)
- No. of episodes: 13

Release
- Original network: Space
- Original release: 16 September – 9 December 2013

Additional information
- Filming dates: 19 June 2013 – mid-July 2013

Series chronology
- ← Previous; Season 4 Next → Season 6

The Amazing Race 5 (also known as The Amazing Race on Space 3) is the fifth season of The Amazing Race, a Latin American reality competition show based on the American series The Amazing Race and the third installment of Space's iteration of the show. Hosted by Toya Montoya, it featured eleven teams of two, each with a pre-existing relationship, in a race across Latin America to win US$250,000. This season visited two continents and six countries and travelled over 12,600 kilometres (7,800 mi) during twelve legs. Starting in Cartagena, teams travelled through Colombia, Peru, Curaçao, the Dominican Republic, Panama and Mexico before finishing in Chiapa de Corzo. This season returned to the regular format by featuring teams from all over Latin America and not only from Brazil, unlike the previous season. This season premiered on Space and TNT on 16 September 2013 at 9:00 p.m. (UTC−3), and the season finale aired on Space and TNT on 9 December 2013 at 9:00 p.m. (UTC−3).

Argentine friends Ezequiel Sapochnik and Tobías de la Barra were the winners of this season, while Uruguayan couple Darío & Esther finished in second place and Argentine dating couple Karina & Braian finished in third place.

== Production ==
=== Development and filming ===
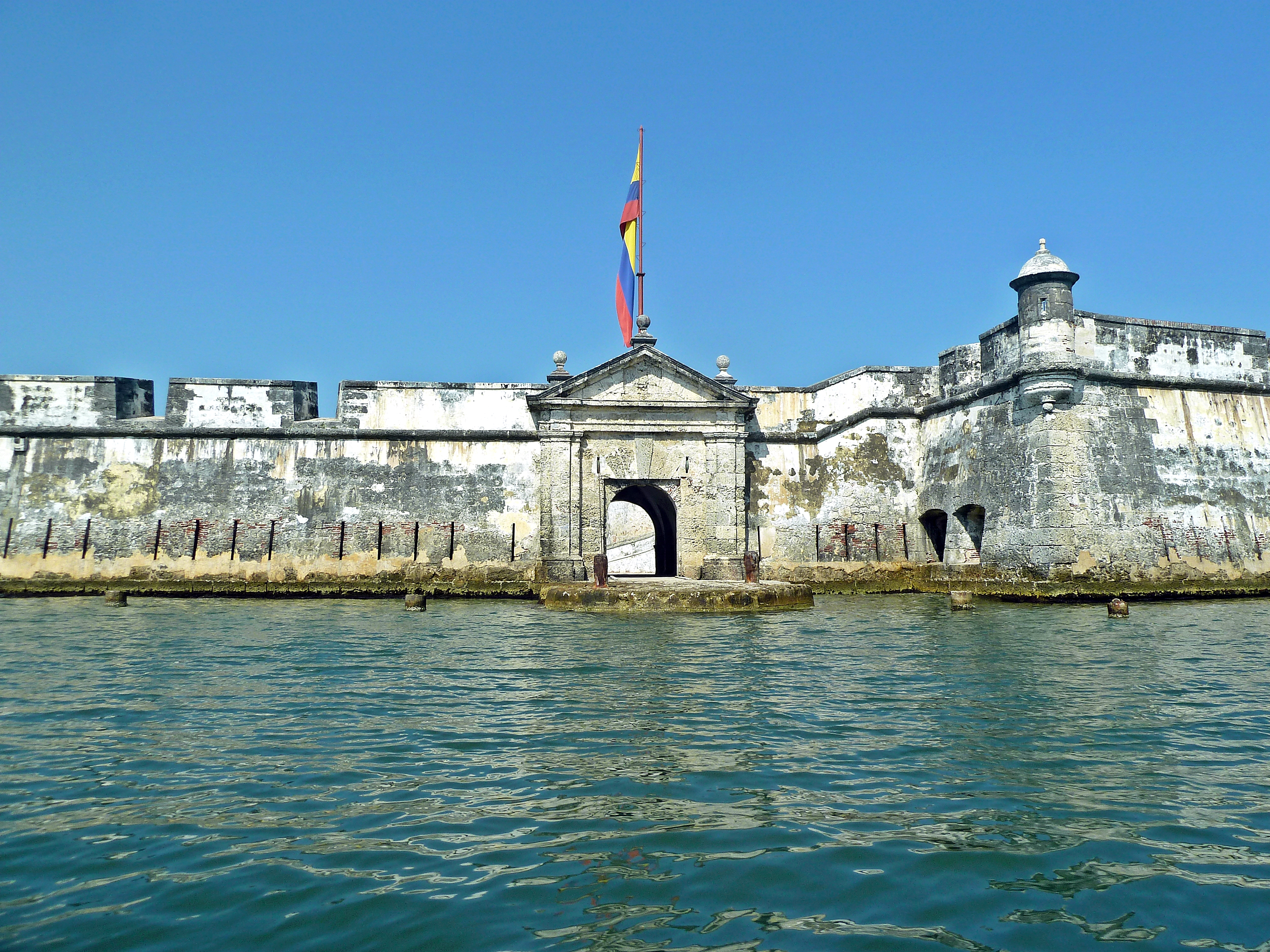
The Starting Line was at the Fort San Fernando de Bocachica on Tierra Bomba Island in Cartagena, Colombia.

Space greenlit the fifth season of the series on 19 October 2012. On 23 April 2013, Colombian television host and model Toya Montoya, who was also a contestant on the third season, was announced as the new host of the show, making her the first female host in the franchise.

Filming for this fifth season took place from 19 June 2013 to mid-July 2013. Ten teams were spotted in Barranquilla, Colombia on 22 June 2013. This season covered nearly 12,600 kilometres (7,800 mi) and featured the first visit by an Amazing Race franchise to the Dutch constituent country of Curaçao.

None of the eliminated teams were present at the Finish Line.

=== Casting ===
Applications for the fifth season were opened for Brazilians on 13 October 2012. On 13 February 2013 applications were also opened for the rest of Latin America until 31 March 2013.

=== Marketing ===
Sponsors for this season were Samsung Electronics and Scotiabank. The sponsors played a major role in the series by providing prizes and integrating their products into various tasks.

== Cast ==
This season had eleven teams from Argentina, Brazil, Colombia, Costa Rica, Mexico, Venezuela, Uruguay for the first time, and the first contestant from Guatemala. For the first time in the regular series, Chile was not represented. The cast included the series's first brothers-in-law, Filippo & Eddy from Venezuela; Evelyn Christopher from Evelyn & Jorge, who was a contestant on the Colombian Got Talent show, Colombia Tiene Talento, in 2012 with the group Aqualia, Teatro Negro de Colombia; the first binational team in the Latin American version, Juanjo & Beto, representing both Guatemala and Mexico (although The Amazing Race: China Rush have had previously presented binational teams); and the first team from Uruguay, married couple Darío & Esther.

Contestants	Age	Relationship	Hometown	Status
Ari Figueroa	26	Siblings	Mexico City, Mexico	Eliminated 1st (in Cartagena, Colombia)
Ra Figueroa	32	Siblings	Mexico City, Mexico	Eliminated 1st (in Cartagena, Colombia)
Filippo Puccio	42	Brothers-in-law	Ocumare del Tuy, Venezuela	Eliminated 2nd (in Santa Marta, Colombia)
Eddy Díaz	47	Brothers-in-law	Maracaibo, Venezuela	Eliminated 2nd (in Santa Marta, Colombia)
Juanjo López	38	Married	Guatemala City, Guatemala	Eliminated 3rd (in Lima, Peru)
Beto Ortega	36	Married	Mexico City, Mexico	Eliminated 3rd (in Lima, Peru)
Débora Cunha	30	Cousins	São Paulo, Brazil	Eliminated 4th (in Lima, Peru)
Renata Kimura	26	Cousins	São Paulo, Brazil	Eliminated 4th (in Lima, Peru)
Astrid Velásquez	34	Sisters	Medellín, Colombia	Eliminated 5th (in Willemstad, Curaçao)
Aleja Velásquez	28	Sisters	Medellín, Colombia	Eliminated 5th (in Willemstad, Curaçao)
Evelyn Cristopher	39	Dating	Bogotá, Colombia	Eliminated 6th (in Puerto Plata, Dominican Republic)
Jorge Avellaneda	30	Dating	Bogotá, Colombia	Eliminated 6th (in Puerto Plata, Dominican Republic)
Jessica Manco	27	Friends	Caracas, Venezuela	Eliminated 7th (in Panama City, Panama)
Carelb "Michelle" Herrera	30	Friends	Caracas, Venezuela	Eliminated 7th (in Panama City, Panama)
Manfred Céspedes	25	Friends	Alajuela, Costa Rica	Eliminated 8th (in Guadalajara, Mexico)
Pierre Monney	27	Friends	San José, Costa Rica	Eliminated 8th (in Guadalajara, Mexico)
Braian Torres	26	Dating	Buenos Aires, Argentina	Third Place
Karina Cordobés	24	Dating	Buenos Aires, Argentina	Third Place
Esther Martínez	41	Couple	Canelones, Uruguay	Second Place
Darío Greni	38	Couple	Canelones, Uruguay	Second Place
Lucas "Tobías" de la Barra	34	Friends	Santa Rosa, Argentina	Winners
Ezequiel Sapochnik	35	Friends	Chubut, Argentina	Winners

== Results ==
The following teams participated in the season, with their relationships at the time of filming. Note that this table is not necessarily reflective of all content broadcast on television due to inclusion or exclusion of some data. Placements are listed in finishing order:

Team placement (by leg)
Team	1	2	3^{1}	4	5^{4}	6ƒ	7^{9}	8	9	10	11	12^{12}	
Ezequiel & Tobías	3rd	9th^	9th	5th	2nd	3rd^{8}	5th	4th^{10}	1st^{⊂}_{⋑}	1st	2nd	1st	1st
Darío & Esther	5th	1st~	5th	2nd	4th	5th	1st	1st	4th	4th	3rd	3rd	2nd
Karina & Braian	2nd	7th+	2nd	4th	6th	6th^{8}	4th	3rd	3rd⊃	2nd	1st	2nd	3rd
Manfred & Pierre	9th	8th–	3rd	3rd	1st	1st	2nd	2nd	2nd	3rd	4th^{11}		
Jessica & Michelle	6th	4th*	7th	6th	5th	4th	3rd	5th^{10}	5th⋐				
Evelyn & Jorge	1st	6th+	4thε^{2}	1st	3rd^{5}	2nd	6th	6th^{10}					
Astrid & Aleja	10th	5th–	6th	7th^{3}	7thə^{6}	7th							
Juanjo & Beto	4th	2nd^	8th	8th	8th^{7}								
Débora & Renata	7th	3rd*	1st	9th^{3}	9th^{7}								
Filippo & Eddy	8th	10th~											
Ari & Ra	11th												

Key

- A red team placement indicates that the team was eliminated.
- A green ƒ indicates that the team won a Fast Forward clue. If placed next to a leg number, this indicates that the Fast Forward was available for that leg but not used.
- A purple ε indicates that the team decided to use the Express Pass on that leg. A magenta ə indicates the team had previously been given the second Express Pass and used it on that leg.
- An underlined blue team placement indicates that the team came in last on a non-elimination leg and had to perform a Speed Bump in the next leg.
- A brown ⊃ or a cyan ⋑ indicates that the team chose to use one of the two U-Turns in a Double U-Turn; ⊂ or ⋐ indicates the team who received it; ^{⊂}_{⋑} indicates that the team was U-Turned, but they used the second U-Turn on another team.
- Matching colored symbols (orange +, teal ^, magenta –, olive * and brown ~) indicate teams who worked together during part of the leg as a result of an Intersection.
- An underlined leg number indicates that there was no mandatory rest period at the Pit Stop and all teams were ordered to continue racing. The first place team was still awarded a prize for that leg. An underlined team placement indicates that the team came in last, was ordered to continue racing, and had to perform a Speed Bump in the next leg.
- Italicized results indicate the position of the team at the midpoint of a two-episode leg.

Notes

1. **^{a}** **^{b}** **^{c}** **^{d}** **^{e}** Four of the nine teams arrived at the Pit Stop after applied 2-hour penalties for failing to complete the second Roadblock (Esther, Jessica, Beto, and Ezequiel) The initial placements for all teams are as follows (the five **boldfaced teams** were not given the penalty):
  1st: **Débora & Renata**; 2nd: Darío & Esther; 3rd: Jessica & Michelle; 4th: Beto & Juanjo; 5th: **Braian & Karina**; 6th: **Manfred & Pierre**; 7th: **Evelyn & Jorge**; 8th: Ezequiel & Tobías; 9th: **Astrid & Aleja**
2. **^{a}** **^{b}** Evelyn & Jorge use their Express Pass to bypass the second Roadblock in Leg 3. Before using the Express Pass, Evelyn elected to perform the Roadblock; this is reflected in the total Roadblock count.
3. **^{a}** **^{b}** Astrid & Aleja and Débora & Renata initially arrived 6th and 7th, respectively, but both teams were each issued 15-minute penalties for traveling by mototaxi instead of by taxi to the Club Deportivo Caza y Pesca as instructed on the clue. While Astrid & Aleja's placement was dropped to 7th, Débora & Renata's placement was dropped to last place; however, they were notified the leg was non-elimination, and the remaining penalty would be assessed at the start of the next leg.
4. Leg 5 was a double-elimination leg. The last two teams to be checked in at the Pit Stop were both eliminated.
5. Evelyn & Jorge initially arrived 2nd, but were issued a 15-minute penalty for not dropping their belongings in the marked area during the additional task in the Club Universitario de Regatas. Ezequiel & Tobias checked-in during the penalty time, dropping Evelyn & Jorge to 3rd.
6. Astrid & Aleja used their Express Pass given to them by Evelyn & Jorge to bypass an additional task in the Club Universitario de Regatas during leg 5. Later, they arrived 7th at the Pit Stop, but were issued a 1-hour penalty for failing to complete the Roadblock. This did not affect their placement, since the remaining teams arrived at the time were unable to check in due to penalties accumulated during the leg (see note 7).
7. **^{a}** **^{b}** Débora & Renata and Beto & Juanjo initially arrived 6th and 8th, respectively, but both teams were each issued 2-hour penalties for refusing to complete the additional task in the Club Universitario de Regatas. Débora & Renata were further issued their 30-minute penalty for not completing correctly the additional task where they had to make an Amazing Race flag. While Beto & Juanjo's placement was not affected by the penalty, Débora & Renata's placement was dropped to last place; as both teams were the last two teams to check-in at the double-elimination leg (see note 4), both teams were eliminated.
8. **^{a}** **^{b}** Ezequiel & Tobías and Karina & Braian initially arrived 1st and 6th, respectively, but both teams were each issued 30-minute penalties for reaching the first Roadblock location before retrieving their clue from the cluebox. While Karina & Braian's placement was not affected by the penalty, Ezequiel & Tobias's placement was dropped to 3rd.
9. All the teams (except Darío & Esther) did not realise that they had to light a candle for Saint Michael at the San Miguel Church as indicated on a sign, and were forced to backtrack and light the candle before being allowed to check in.
10. **^{a}** **^{b}** **^{c}** Ezequiel & Tobias (who initially arrived 2nd) and Jessica & Michelle (4th) were each issued 30-minute penalties for exceeding the speed-limit while driving during the course of the leg. Their placements were dropped to 4th and 5th place, respectively. Evelyn & Jorge were eligible to be penalized for the same infraction, but they were the last team to arrive to the Pit Stop, resulting in their elimination.
11. Manfred & Pierre failed to complete an additional task at the Lienzo Charro Ignacio Zermeño. After all the other teams had already checked in at the Pit Stop, Toya came out to their location to inform them of their elimination.
12. Leg 12 was a double-length leg. It featured a Virtual Pit Stop and had one Detour (first half) and two Roadblocks shown over two episodes.

== Prizes ==
The prize for each leg is awarded to the first place team for that leg.

- Leg 5 – A pair of water resistant high-definition cameras.
- Leg 6 – A pair of digital cameras.
- Leg 7 – A pair of mountain bikes.
- Leg 8 – US$2,500 for each team member courtesy of Scotiabank.
- Leg 9 – A pair of smartphones.
- Leg 10 – A pair of LED TVs.
- Leg 11 – A pair of digital cameras for extreme sports.
- Leg 12:
  - Midpoint – A pair of tablet computers.
  - 1st Place – US$250,000
  - 2nd Place – US$20,000
  - 3rd Place – A trip for four to Orlando, Florida, United States.

== Race summary ==
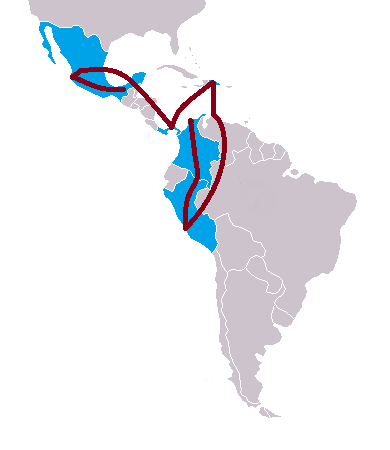
Route Map.

Destinations	Air travel Rail travel Water travel Bus travel Helicopter travel Bicycle travel Gondola travel
Route Markers	Desvío (Detour) Obstáculo (Roadblock) Retorno (U-Turn) Multa (Speed Bump); Intersección (Intersection) Avance (Fast Forward) Parada (Pit Stop)

=== Leg 1 (Colombia) ===
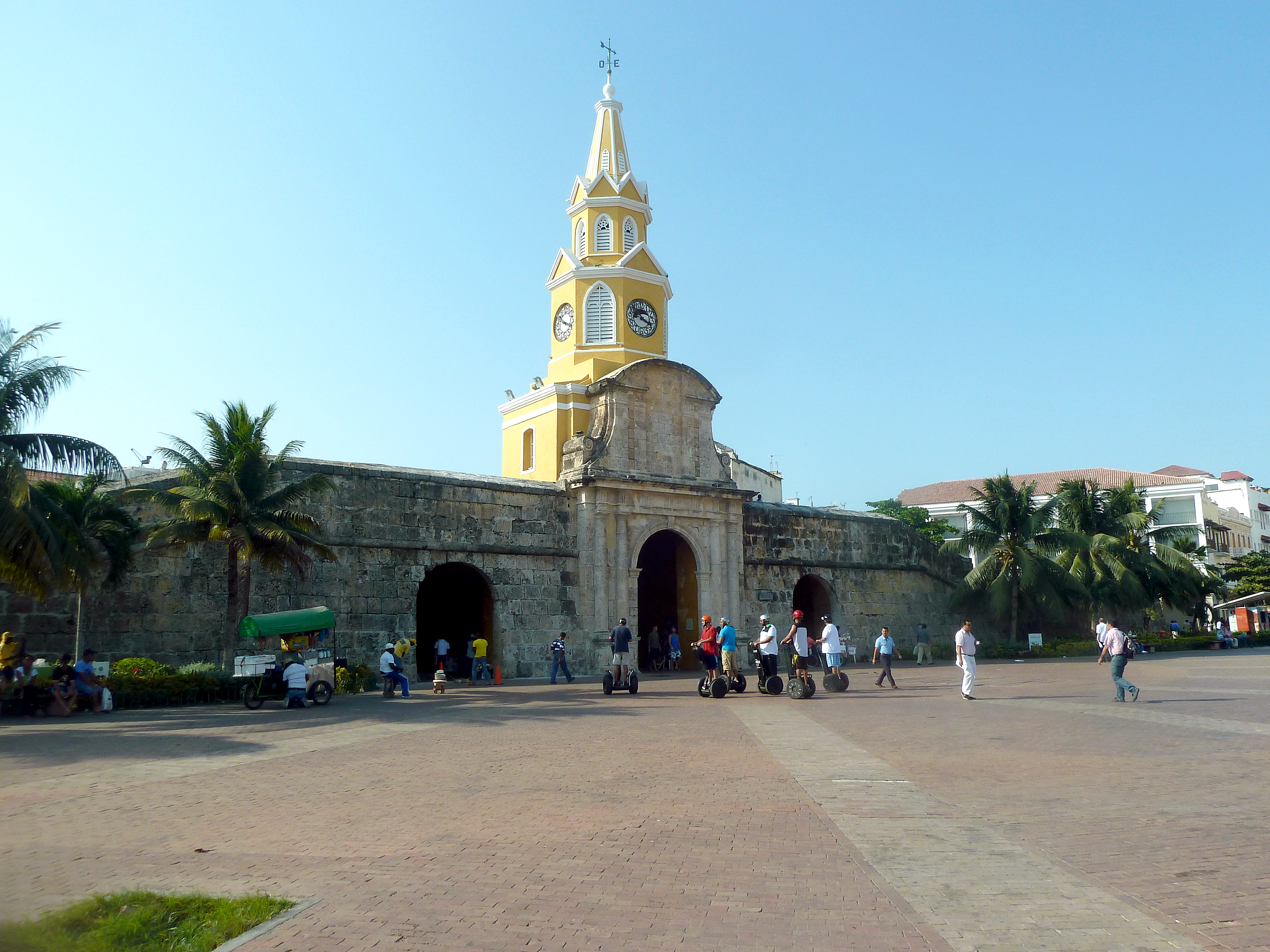
At Torre del Reloj, teams had to load wooden carts with three blocks of ice.

- Episode 1 (16 September 2013)
- Prize: Two Express Passes (Note: An item that can be used to skip any one task of the team's choosing. The winning team keeps one for themselves but must relinquish the second to another team before the end of the fourth leg.) (awarded to Evelyn & Jorge)
- Eliminated: Ari & Ra

Locations

- Cartagena, Colombia (Tierra Bomba Island – Fort San Fernando de Bocachica) (Starting Line)
- Cartagena (La Bodeguita Dock)
- Cartagena (Torre del Reloj)
- Cartagena (Plaza Fernández de Madrid)
- Cartagena (Hotel Las Américas Casa de Playa – Beach)
- Cartagena (Hotel Las Américas Casa de Playa – Deck of Swimming Pool #3)

Episode summary

- Teams began at Fort San Fernando de Bocachica in Cartagena, Colombia, and had to search among seven ship models with letters on their sails for six letters that were not repeated. Once teams got all six letters, they had to unscramble the correct word (CARIBE) and tell it to Toya in exchange for their next clue. Teams then had to travel by motorboat to La Bodeguita Dock and search for a hat vendor, who had their next clue directing them to Torre del Reloj. There, teams had to load three blocks of ice into a wooden cart and then transport them to Plaza Fernández de Madrid in order to receive their next clue, which directed them to the beach outside the Hotel Las Américas Casa de Playa.
- In this season's first Roadblock, one team member had to search among hundreds of sandcastles for one containing a small buried statue of India Catalina and exchange it for their next clue, which directed them to the nearby Pit Stop. If racers did not find the statue, they had to rebuild the sandcastle before continuing.

=== Leg 2 (Colombia) ===
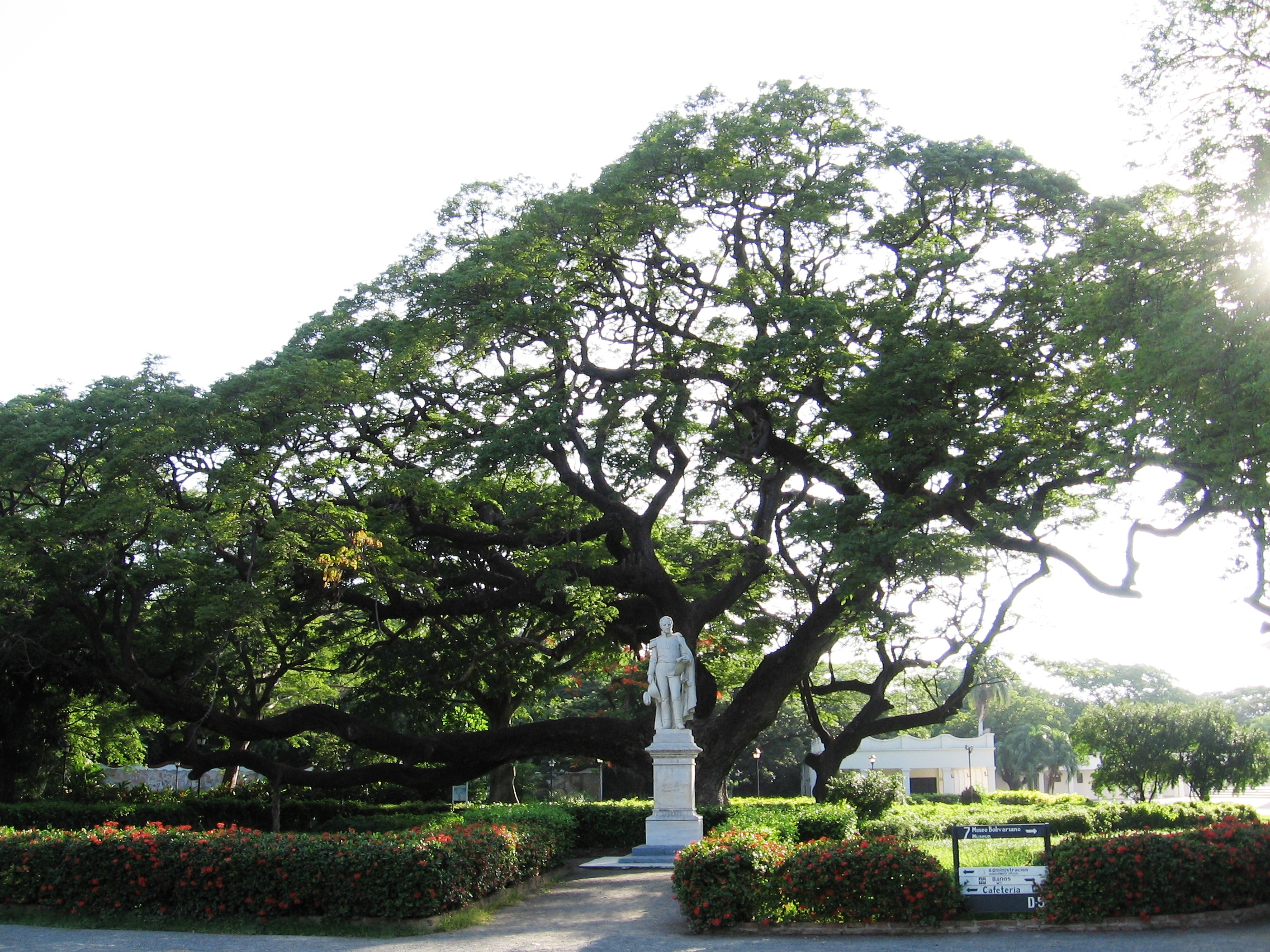
The Quinta de San Pedro Alejandrino in Santa Marta was the second Pit Stop.

- Episode 2 (23 September 2013)
- Prize: A pair of water resistant watches (awarded to Darío & Esther)
- Eliminated: Filippo & Eddy

Locations

- Cartagena (Sonesta Beach Resort Cartagena)
- Barranquilla (Museo del Caribe (in Spanish))
- Barranquilla (Complejo Deportivo Carlos "El Pibe" Valderrama)
- Santa Marta (Marina)
- Santa Marta (Port of Santa Marta)
- Santa Marta (Quinta de San Pedro Alejandrino)

Episode summary

- At the start of this leg, teams were instructed to travel by taxi to the Museo del Caribe in Barranquilla in order to find their next clue.
- In this leg's first Roadblock, one team member had to count the tubes from a work of art in front of the museum, find the judge in Gabriel García Márquez room and tell her the answer (454) in order to receive their next clue.
- After the first Roadblock, teams encountered an Intersection at the Complejo Deportivo Carlos "El Pibe" Valderrama, which required two teams to join together. The teams were paired up thusly: Darío & Esther and Filippo & Eddy, Juanjo & Beto and Ezequiel & Tobías, Débora & Renata and Jessica & Michelle, Astrid & Aleja and Manfred & Pierre, and Evelyn & Jorge and Karina & Braian. The joined teams had to play against four soccer players and score four goals within 15 minutes in order to receive their next clue. After this task, teams were no longer joined.
- After the Intersection, teams had to travel to the marina of Santa Marta in order to receive their next clue, which directed them to travel by taxi to the Port of Santa Marta.
- In this leg's second Roadblock, the team member who did not perform the previous Roadblock had to move three palettes with a forklift to the marked dropping point. Then, they had to look for ten marked containers from behind a marked line and write down the identification numbers in order to receive their next clue, which directed them to the Pit Stop: Quinta de San Pedro Alejandrino.

=== Leg 3 (Colombia) ===
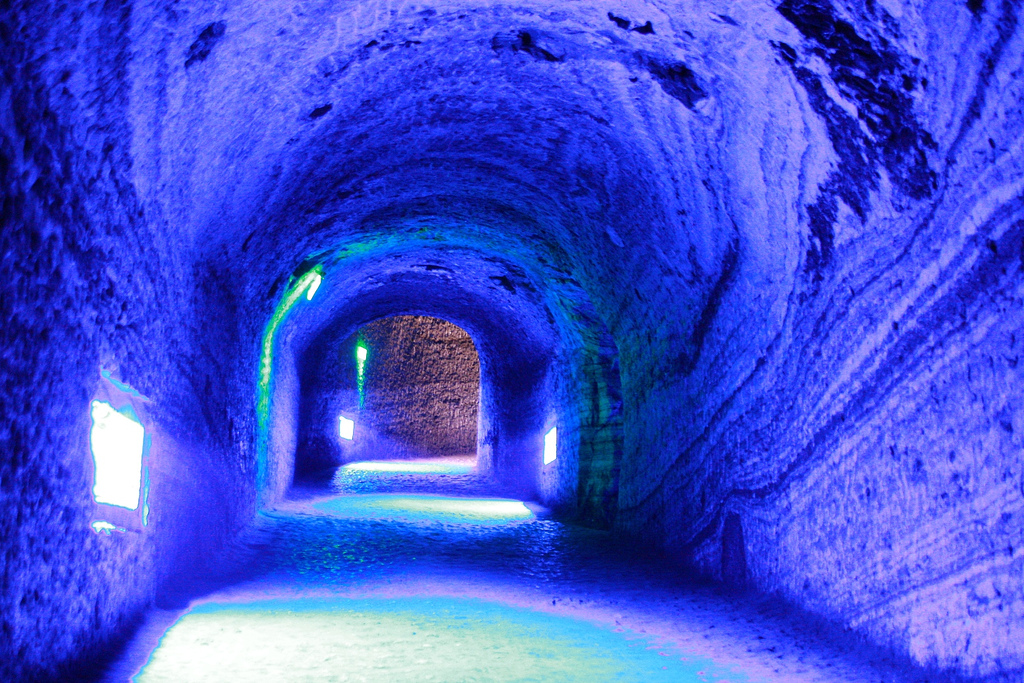
Teams had to search for a puzzle on the grounds of the Salt Cathedral of Zipaquirá.

- Episode 3 (30 September 2013)
- Prize: A pair of wireless speakers (awarded to Débora & Renata)

Locations

- Santa Marta (Quinta de San Pedro Alejandrino)
- Santa Marta (Simón Bolívar International Airport) → Bogotá (El Dorado International Airport)
- Tocancipá (Jaime Duque Park)
- Zipaquirá (Plaza del Minero)
- Zipaquirá (Salt Cathedral of Zipaquirá)
- Zipaquirá (Main Plaza – Zipaquirá Cathedral)

Episode summary

- At the start of this leg, teams were instructed to fly to Bogotá. Once there, teams found their next clue at Jaime Duque Park in Tocancipá.
- In this leg's first Roadblock, one team member had to find the Caribbean Sea zone of the park and decipher a code on the banners of a frigate floating in a lake using a table with codes – FORTUNA IUVAT AUDACES – in order to receive their next clue.
- After the first Roadblock, teams had to photograph four different characters (bikers, a girl with balloons, a singer and a juggler) in the park using four different features of a Samsung Galaxy S4 camera (drama, panoramic, sound and capture and animated picture respectively) and exchange the pictures with the judge at the Tyrannosaurus rex exhibition for their next clue, which directed them to Plaza del Minero in Zipaquirá.
- In this leg's second Roadblock, the team member who did not perform the previous Roadblock had to climb up a Ceiba-shaped climbing wall, retrieve an Amazing Race flag and exchange it for their next clue.
- After the second Roadblock, teams had to search the Salt Cathedral of Zipaquirá for a set of puzzle pieces and assemble the pieces, which depicted the Pit Stop: Zipaquirá Cathedral.

Additional note

- This was a non-elimination leg.

=== Leg 4 (Colombia → Peru) ===
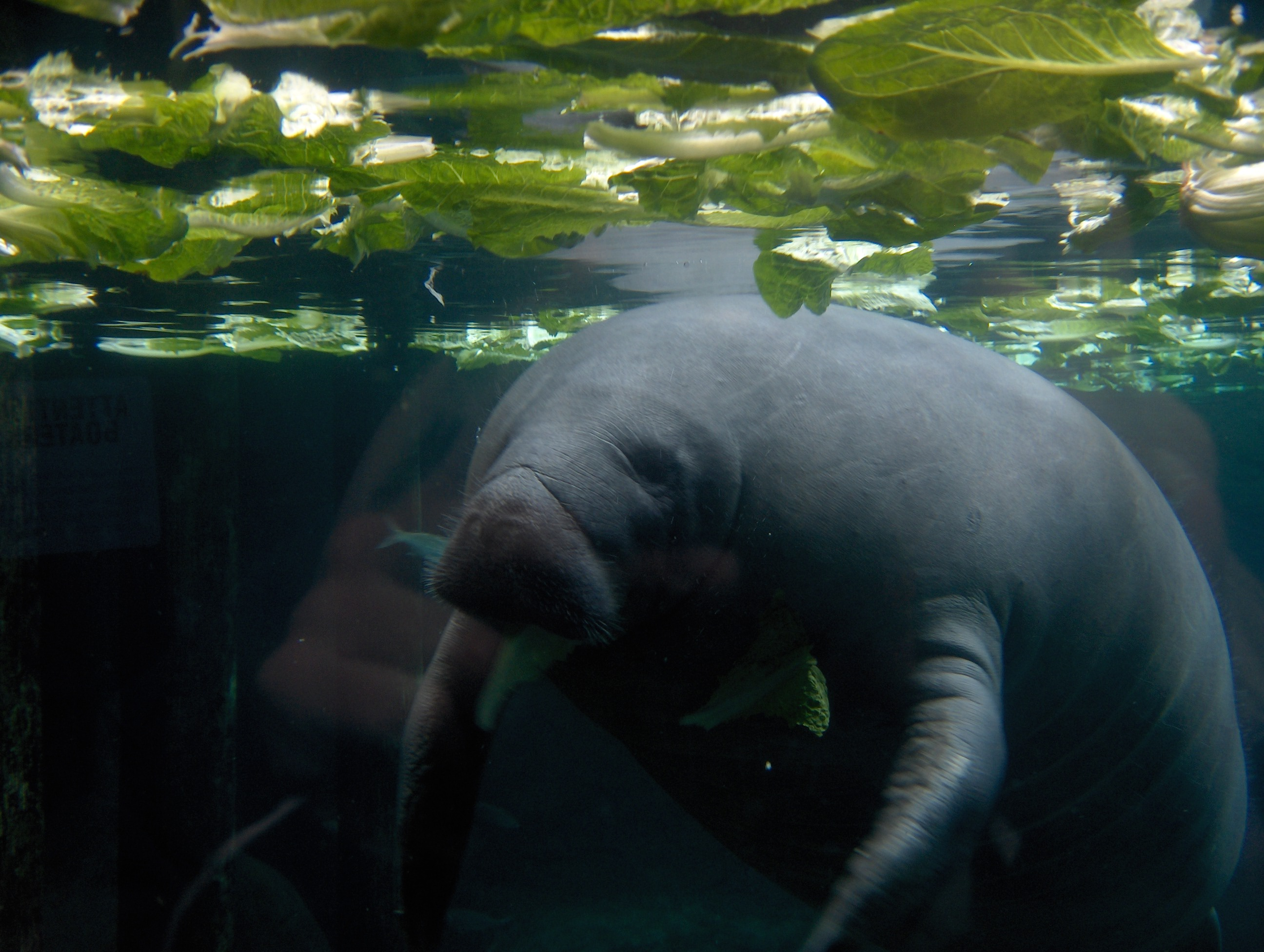
For their Speed Bump, Ezequiel & Tobías had to clean and feed two baby manatees.

- Episode 4 (7 October 2013)
- Prize: A pair of digital music players (awarded to Evelyn & Jorge)

Locations

- Bogotá (El Dorado International Airport) → Iquitos, Peru (Coronel FAP Francisco Secada Vignetta International Airport)
- Iquitos (Centro de Rescate Amazónico)
- Iquitos (Hacienda Acarahuasú)
- Iquitos (Ferretería Loreto Importaciones)
- Iquitos (Hotel El Dorado Plaza)
- Iquitos (Mercado de Productores or Casa de Fierro)
- Iquitos (Club Social Deportivo de Caza y Pesca → Santo Tomás Island)
- Iquitos (Mirador Independencia)

Episode summary

- At the start of this leg, teams were instructed to fly to Iquitos, Peru. Once there, teams found their next clue at the Centro de Rescate Amazónico and were sent to the Hacienda Acarahuasú.
- For their Speed Bump, Tobías & Ezequiel had to clean a manatee tank then clean and feed two manatee babies before they could continue racing.
- In this leg's Roadblock, one person had to use a simple, traditional tool to climb to the top of a fruit tree, hack off a branch of aguaje fruits and fill a bag before receiving their next clue.
- After the Roadblock, teams had to travel to Ferretería Loreto Importaciones and use a provided ScotiaBank credit card to purchase a hammer, nails, rope and gloves before receiving their next clue. Teams then had to find their next clue at the Hotel El Dorado Plaza.
- This season's first Detour was a choice between Deliver (Entregar) or Observe (Observar). In Deliver, teams had to travel to Mercado de Productores, pick up three bags of yuca and three bushels of bananas,load them into a moto-taxi and deliver them to three different welfare centers in exchange for stamps. After collecting three stamps, teams could exchange them for their next clue. In Observe, teams had to look for five consonants (PTMYZ) and three vowels (UAO) written on the tops of moto-taxis. Once they got all eight letters, teams received a numerical value for each letter and had to solve a mathematical problem by multiplying the values of the consonants and dividing by the sum of the vowels (157.5) before receiving their next clue.
- After the Detour, teams had to travel by ferry to Santo Tomás Island. There, teams had to build a raft using the tools they had purchased earlier that matched a provided example before receiving their next clue, which instructed them to paddle on their raft along the Amazonas River to the next Pit Stop: Mirador Independencia.

Additional note

- There was no elimination at the end of this leg; all teams were instead instructed to continue racing.

=== Leg 5 (Peru) ===
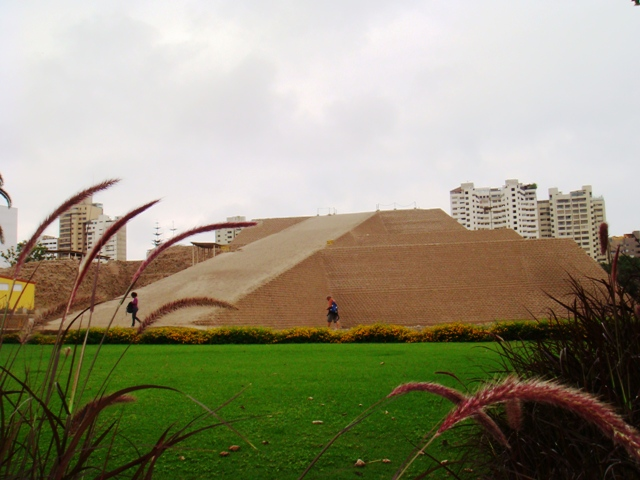
Huaca Huallamarca was the season's fifth Pit Stop.

Airdate: October 14, 2013

- Iquitos (Coronel FAP Francisco Secada Vignetta International Airport) to Lima (Jorge Chávez International Airport)
- Lima (Centro Comercial Textil e Industrial de Gamarra)
- Lima (Hotel Casa Andina Select) (Overnight Rest)
- Lima (Primera Brigada de Fuerzas Especiales)
- Callao (Club Universitario de Regatas)
- Lima (Le Cordon Bleu Peru)
- Lima (Huaca Huallamarca)

For their Speed Bump, Débora & Renata had to deliver twenty suitcases to ten different rooms of the hotel, without using the elevator, before they could continue racing.

This leg's Detour was a choice between Fuerzas Especiales (Special Forces) or Paracaidistas (Paratroopers). In Fuerzas Especiales, teams had to complete a course used by the Peruvian Special Forces to train, which included climbing, to receive their next clue. In Paracaidistas, teams had to complete a training session of the paratroopers division, which included bungee jumping from a tower to the ground, to receive their next clue.

In this leg's Roadblock, one team member had to eat and then recognize four out of six different ingredients in each of four different dishes to receive their next clue from the chef.

Additional tasks

- At Centro Comercial Textil e Industrial de Gamarra, teams had to buy yellow and black cloth in order to make an Amazing Race flag. First, they had to take their cloths to Galería Santa Rosa, where a man would sew their cloths together. Then, teams had to take their flag to Galería Victoria, where another man would embroider the words The Amazing Race on it and give them their next clue. Teams had to keep their flags for the rest of the leg.
- At Primera Brigada de Fuerzas Especiales, teams had to undergo a military training exercise to receive their next clue.
- At the Club Universitario de Regatas, teams had to complete an Olympic rowing circuit to receive their next clue from the rowing instructor.

Additional note

- This was a double-elimination leg.

=== Leg 6 (Peru → Curaçao) ===
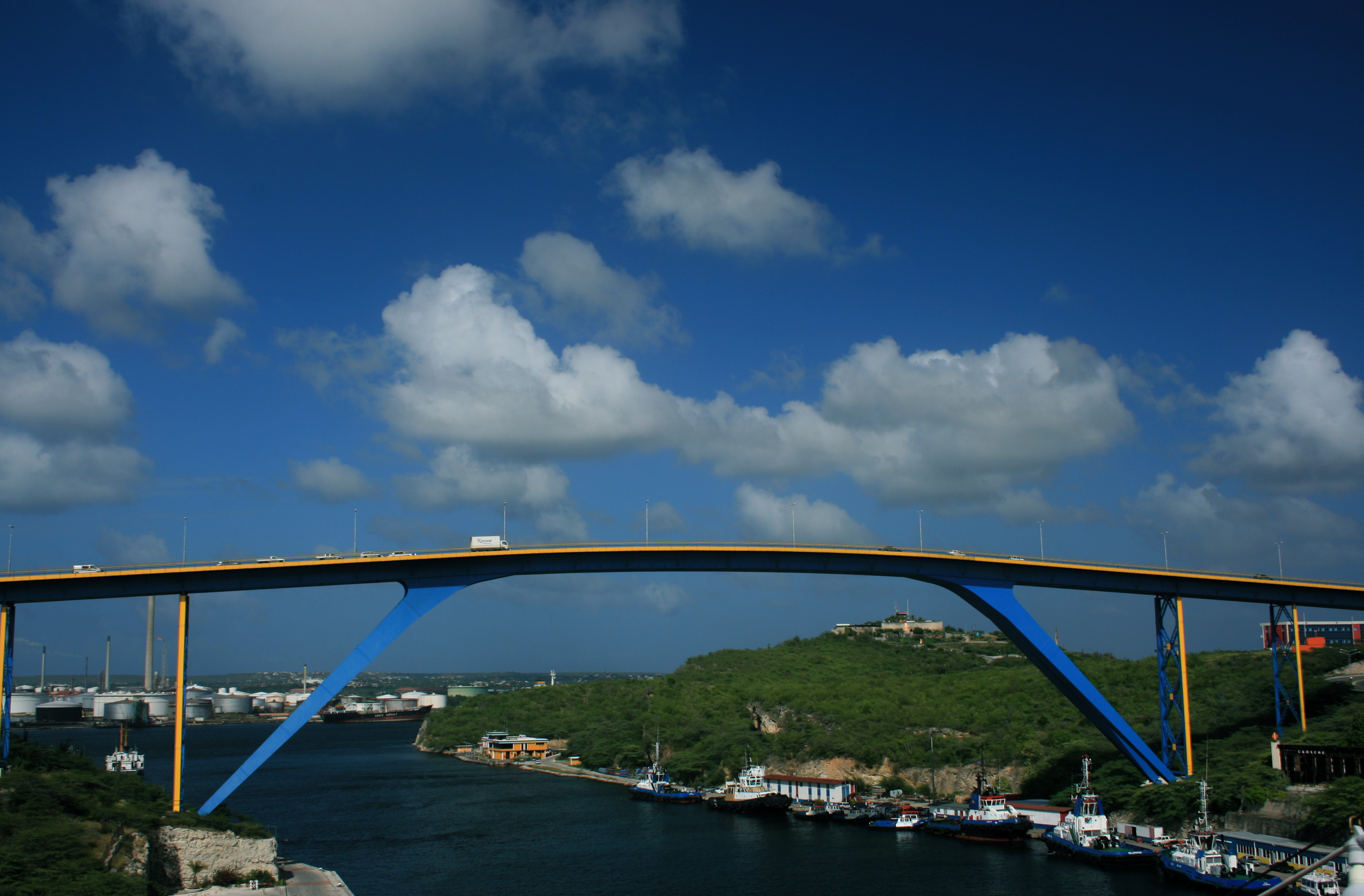
In this leg's first Roadblock, one team member had to rappel down the Queen Juliana Bridge.

Airdate: October 21, 2013

- Lima (Huaca Huallamarca)
- Lima (Jorge Chávez International Airport) to Willemstad, Curaçao, Netherlands (Curaçao International Airport)
- Willemstad (Wilhelmina Park)
- Willemstad (Queen Juliana Bridge)
- Jan Thiel (Caracasbaaiweg Roundabout)
- Jan Thiel (Windsurfing School Curaçao)
- Willemstad (CBA Television – É Notisia Studio)
- Willemstad (Tula Monument)
- Cas Abao (Cas Abao Beach)

In this leg's first Roadblock, one team member had to rappel down the Queen Juliana Bridge and get their next clue from the instructor once on the ground. Then, the team member had to follow a marked path back to the top of the bridge and reunite with their teammate.

In this leg's second Roadblock, the team member who did not perform the previous Roadblock had to stand up paddle to a nearby platform, where they would have to rescue a person and take them back to shore in order to get their next clue.

A Fast Forward clue was visible along with the second Roadblock clue. It is unknown what the task required, since it was unaired.

Additional task

- At the É Notisia Studio in CBA Television Studios, teams had to read a news segment written in Papiamentu, which reported a terrible accident at the Tula Monument. If teams completed this task correctly, they would be instructed to make their way on foot to the Tula Monument in Rif in order to assist in a simulation of an accident. Once there, teams had to do perform first aid to an injured person and then take them to an ambulance. Once teams completed their task correctly, the paramedic would hand them their next clue.

=== Leg 7 (Curaçao → Dominican Republic) ===
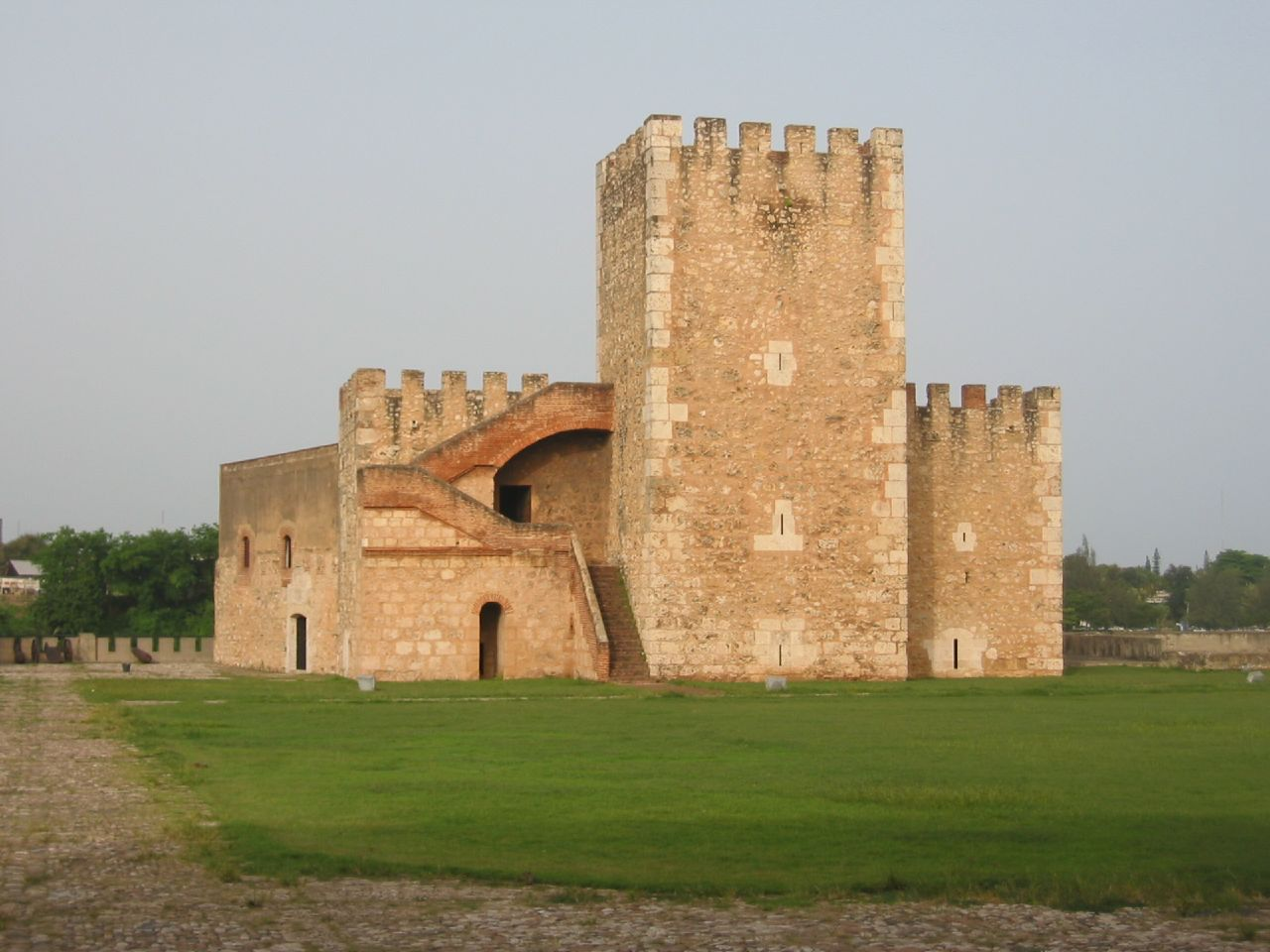
Fortaleza Ozama was the seventh Pit Stop.

Airdate: October 28, 2013

- Willemstad (Curaçao International Airport) to Santo Domingo, Dominican Republic (Las Américas International Airport)
- Santo Domingo (Crowne Plaza Santo Domingo – Club Lounge) (Overnight Rest)
- Santo Domingo (Plaza de la Cultura)
- Santo Domingo (Casandra Damirón Metro Station) to Villa Mella (Mamá Tingó Metro Station)
- Villa Mella (La Sirena Store)
- Villa Mella (Mamá Tingó Metro Station) to Santo Domingo (Gregorio Luperón Metro Station)
- Santo Domingo (Cristo Te Ama School)
- Santo Domingo (Gregorio Urbano Gilbert Metro Station to Juan Bosch Metro Station)
- Santo Domingo (Centro Olímpico Juan Pablo Duarte)
- Santo Domingo (Saint Michael's Church)
- Santo Domingo (Mercado Modelo or Chinatown)
- Santo Domingo (Fortaleza Ozama)

In this leg's Roadblock, one team member had to play la vitilla, a game derived from baseball, which required the team member to use a bat, similar to a broomstick, and hit a small ball ten times between the delimited area to receive their next clue from the coach.

This leg's Detour was a choice between Cuadro (Picture) or Cartel (Poster). In Cuadro, teams had to make their way to the Mercado Modelo and search in one of two marked art stores for a picture matching their given extract of the original picture. Once teams found their picture, they had to exchange it for their next clue. In Cartel, teams had to make their way to the Chinatown, where they had to search for a poster matching their given Chinese characters in order to get their next clue.

Additional tasks

- At La Sirena Store, teams had to buy four pairs of school shoes and ten items from a school supplies list for a total amount of RD$ 2,792, with only a 0,99 cents of margin of error. If teams bought all ten items using no more or less than the indicated money, they would receive their next clue. This clue instructed teams to make their way by Santo Domingo Metro to the Cristo Te Ama School and deliver the school supplies to the children to receive their next clue.
- At Saint Michael's Church, teams would receive their clue from a parishioner sitting next to a table full of candles. Teams had to notice a sign over the table that instructed them to also "light a candle for Saint Michael".

=== Leg 8 (Dominican Republic) ===
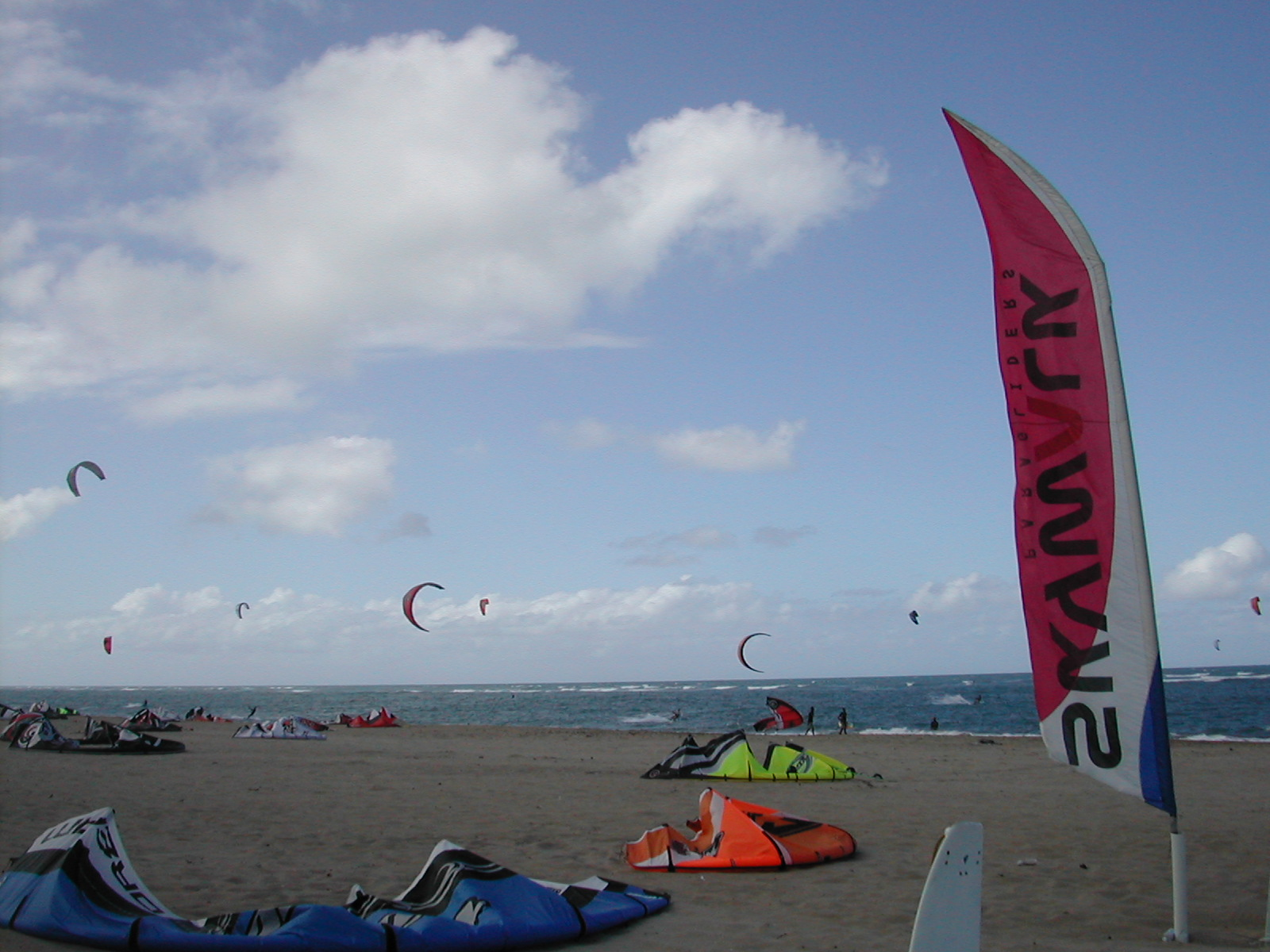
The Kite Beach Hotel in Cabarete was the site of this leg's Roadblock.

Airdate: November 4, 2013

- Cabarete (Kite Beach Hotel – Private Beach)
- Puerto Plata (VH Gran Ventana Beach Resort) (Overnight Rest)
- Puerto Plata (Casa Museo General Gregorio Luperón)
- Imbert (27 Charcos de la Damajagua)
- Puerto Plata (Playa Dorada Golf Course)
- Puerto Plata (Puntilla del Malecón)

In this leg's Roadblock, one team member had to complete an obstacles circuit with their hands tied, crawling over a pool with water, digging on the sand with their feet until they found a figurine, and then digging with their feet to make enough space to go under a tree trunk to receive their next clue.

For their Speed Bump, Evelyn & Jorge had to eat each one plate of mofongo before they could continue racing.

This leg's Detour was a choice between Distancia (Distance) or Precisión (Accuracy). In Distancia, each team member had to hit five golf balls at least 200 yards (180 m) away to receive their next clue. In Precisión, each team member had to hit a golf ball to the hole in no more than two hits. Once each team member sunk five balls in the hole, they would receive their next clue.

Additional task

- At the 27 Charcos de la Damajagua, teams had to complete a circuit in which they had to climb small waterfalls and then return sliding down the waterfalls and in some cases jumping off them. Then, teams had to collect two small bags with coins and deposit them on a Scotiabank piggy bank. Once teams completed the course, they would receive their next clue from their guide.

=== Leg 9 (Dominican Republic → Panama) ===
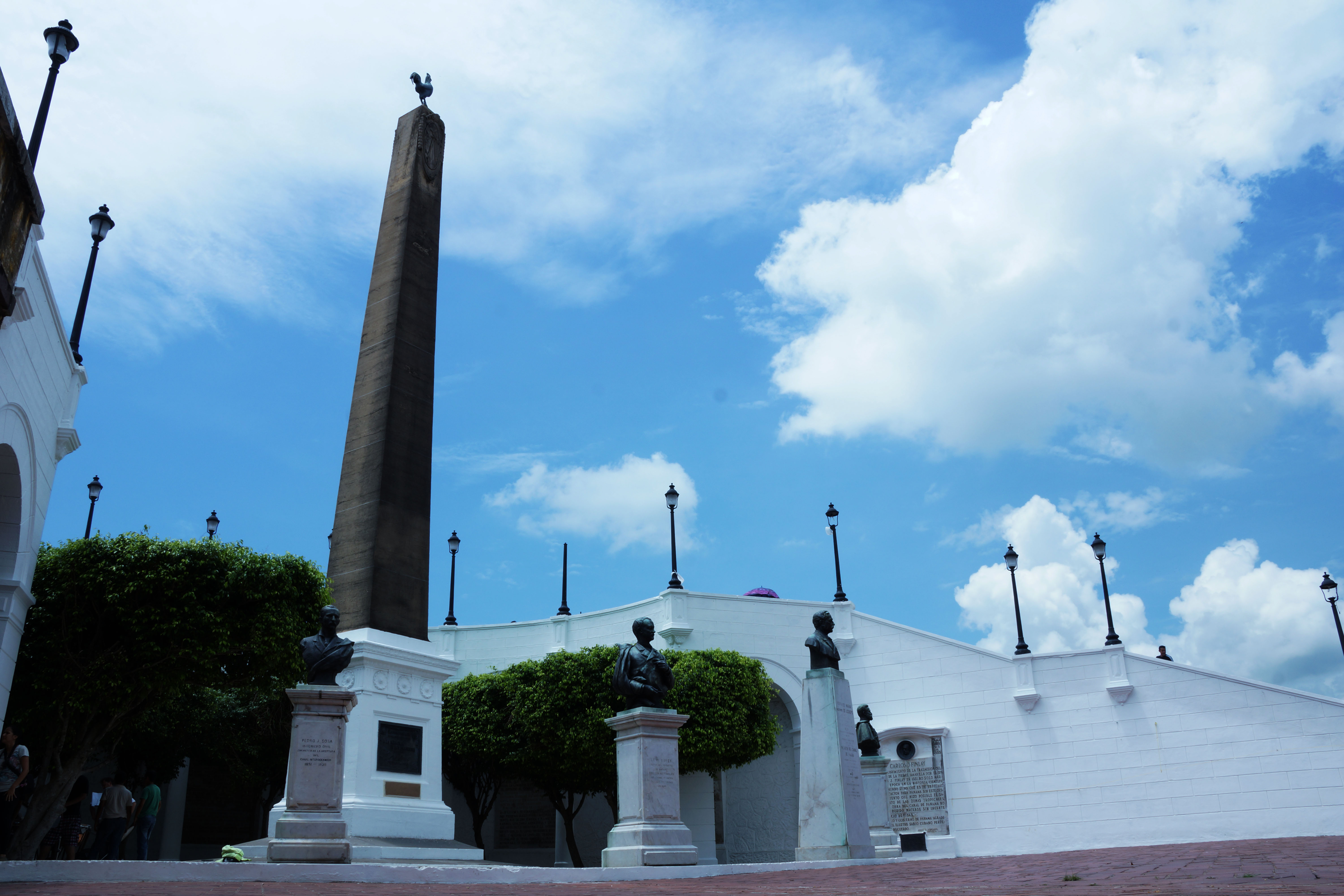
Teams visited Plaza de Francia in Panama City's Casco Viejo during this leg.

Airdate: November 11, 2013

- Santo Domingo (Las Américas International Airport) to Panama City, Panama (Tocumen International Airport)
- Panama City (Parque Corporativo Albrook Field – Scotiabank ATM)
- Panama City (Albrook Bus Terminal) to Chame (Bus Stop)
- Nueva Gorgona (Hotel Cabañas de Playa Gorgona) (Overnight Rest)
- Chame (Nitrocity Panama Action Sports Resort)
- Panama City (Plaza de Francia (in Spanish))
- Panama City (Isaac Hanono Misrri Street)
- Panama City (Bayfront Tower – Helipad)

This leg's Detour was a choice between Tierra (Earth) or Agua (Water). In Tierra, both team members had to ride an all-terrain vehicle on a course while looking for their clue under one of many buckets, with only a few containing clues and the rest containing hourglasses. If teams found an hourglass instead of a clue, they would have to wait until the sand went from one side of the hourglass to the other before continuing their search. In Agua, one team member at a time had to ride a wakeboard while being towed by an electronic mechanism from one side of a lagoon to the other without falling from the board, and then returning in the same way to the starting point. Once both team members had completed this task successfully, they would receive their next clue.

In this leg's Roadblock, one team member had to search among the classified ads of fifty newspapers for the one containing their next clue. This ad instructed teams to make their way to the next Pit Stop, the helipad of the Bayfront Tower.

Additional task

- At the Scotiabank ATM, teams had to get their leg money, US$260, from the automated teller machine.

=== Leg 10 (Panama) ===
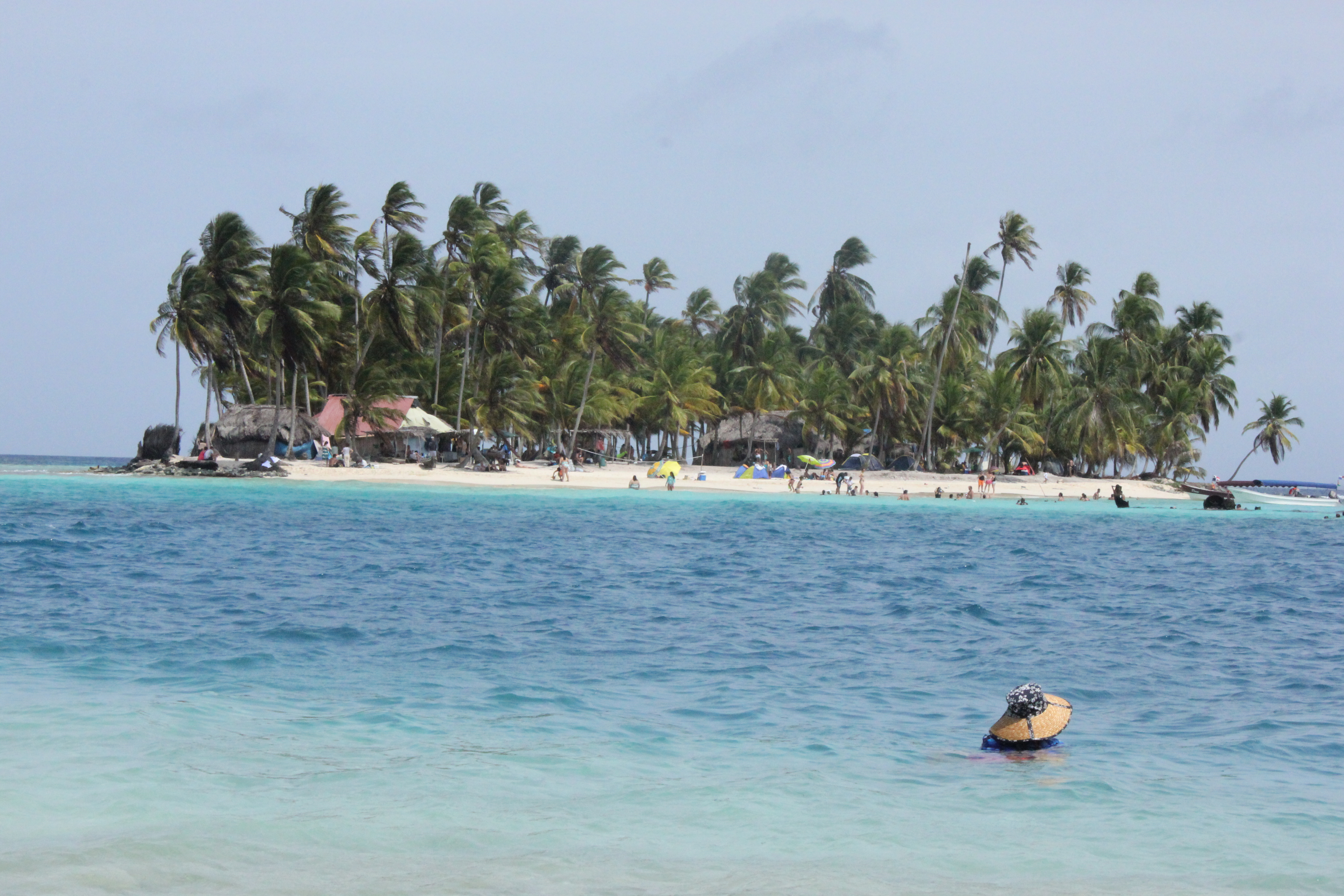
Perro Island in the San Blas Islands was the site for this leg's Detour and Roadblock.

Airdate: November 18, 2013

- Cartí Sugtupu, Guna Yala (Cartí Dock) to El Porvenir, San Blas Islands (El Porvenir Dock)
- El Porvenir (El Porvenir Beach) (Overnight Rest)
- Nalunega Island (Néstor's House)
- Tortuga Island (Beach)
- Perro Island (Perro Island's Dock)
- Perro Island (Shipwreck)
- Pelícano Island (Beach)

This leg's Detour was a choice between Visual or Manual. In Visual, teams had to search for a Mola matching their given picture among many molas hanging from a cord. Once teams found the correct mola, the Guna woman would give them their next clue. In Manual, teams had to build the wall of a Guna hut using only Gynerium sagittatum for its construction. Once the judge was pleased with their work, teams would receive their next clue.

In this leg's Roadblock, one team member had to swim from the beach to a shipwreck, where they had to search for a conch containing their next clue, among dozens of empty conches. Once the team members got the clue, they had to swim back to the beach and read the clue with their teammate.

Additional tasks

- At El Porvenir Beach, teams had to sign up for one of four departure times for the next morning, starting at 9:00 a.m. until 9:15 a.m. Then, teams had to assemble the tent in which they would spend the night.
- Teams had to search in the Nalunega Island for Néstor's House, where an old woman from the Guna people would hand them their next clue.
- At the beach on Tortuga Island, teams had to place a sail on a cayuco. Once the instructor approved their work, teams had to use this boat to make their way to the Perro Island.

=== Leg 11 (Panama → Mexico) ===
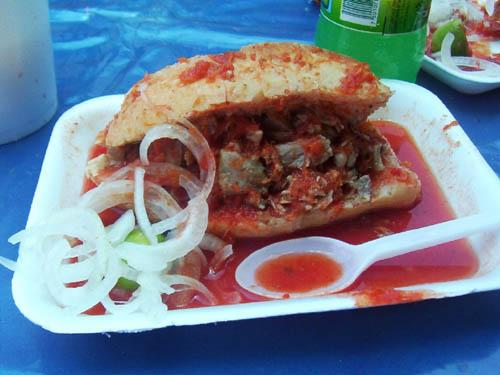
In this leg's second Roadblock, one team member had to eat four small tortas ahogadas.

Airdate: November 25, 2013

- Panama City (Tocumen International Airport) to Guadalajara, Mexico (Miguel Hidalgo y Costilla International Airport)
- Zapopan (Patria Avenue #2051 – Scotiabank ATM)
- Guadalajara (Hotel Fiesta Americana) (Overnight Rest)
- Tequila (Mundo Cuervo)
- Tequila (Mundo Cuervo Agave Plantation)
- Guadalajara (Tortas Toño)
- Guadalajara (Lienzo Charro Ignacio Zermeño Padilla)
- Guadalajara (Plaza de Armas)
- Guadalajara (Instituto Cultural Cabañas)

For their Speed Bump, Darío & Esther had to find the correct card with The Amazing Race logo among dozens of cards with logos that looked similar before they could continue racing.

In this leg's first Roadblock, one team member had to harvest seven agave tequilana plants using the traditional Jimador harvesting method to receive their next clue.

In this leg's second Roadblock, the team member who did not perform the previous Roadblock had to eat four small tortas ahogadas, a sandwich submerged in dried chili pepper, to receive their next clue.

Additional tasks

- At the Scotiabank ATM, teams had to get their leg money from the automated teller machine.
- At the Lienzo Charro Ignacio Zermeño Padilla, each team member had to perform twenty consecutive figures with a lasso, known as floreo de reata, following the charro demonstration. Once both team members completed the floreo de reata successfully, the charro would hand them their next clue.

=== Leg 12 [Part 1] (Mexico) ===
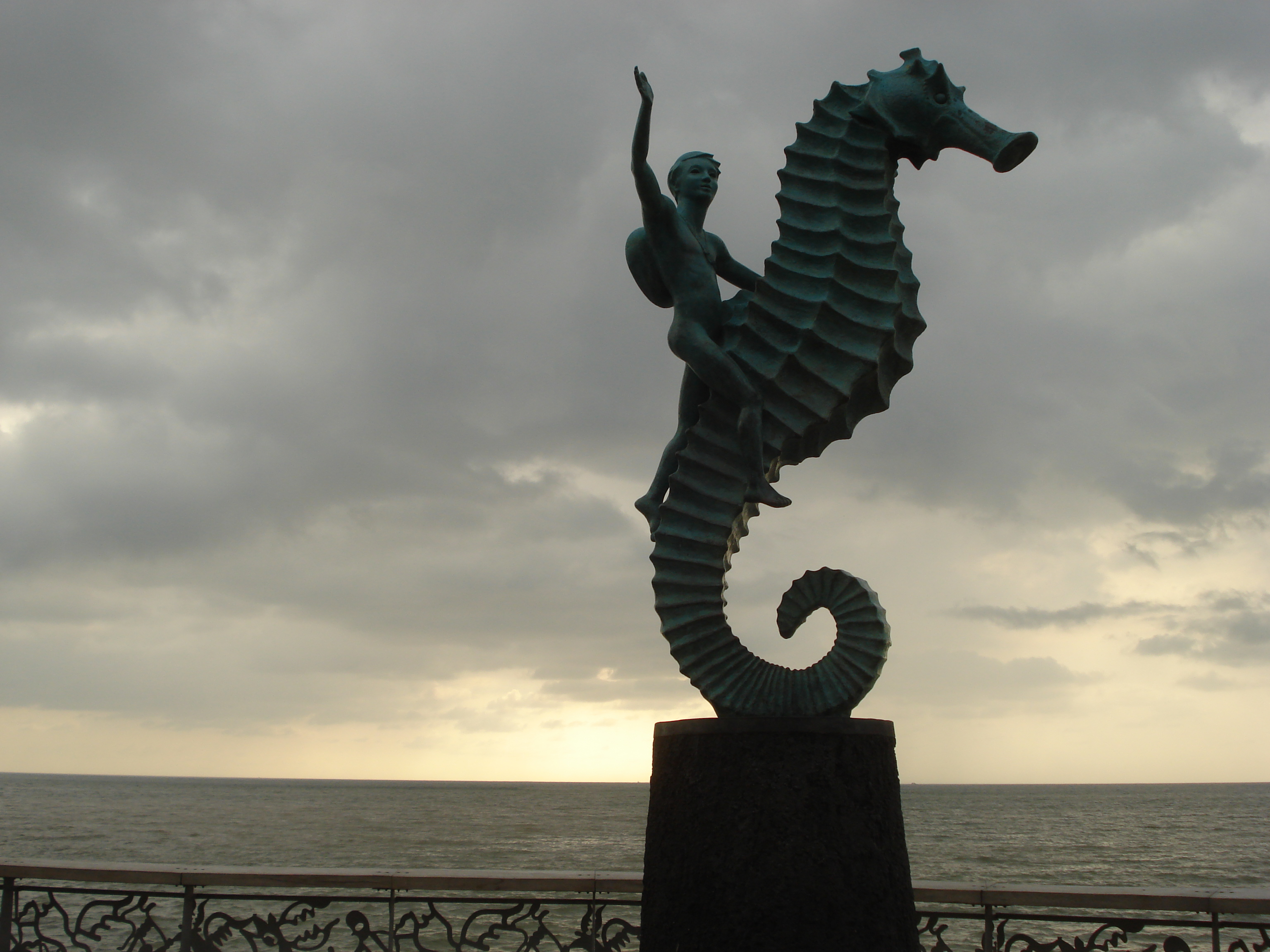
Teams had to find Don Regino at the seahorse sculpture located on the Malecón of Puerto Vallarta, known as El Caballito.

Airdate: December 2, 2013

- Guadalajara (Miguel Hidalgo y Costilla International Airport) to Puerto Vallarta (Licenciado Gustavo Díaz Ordaz International Airport)
- Puerto Vallarta (Malecón – La Rotonda del Mar)
- Mismaloya (Encore Bungee & Adventure Park)
- Puerto Vallarta (Malecón – El Caballito)
- Puerto Vallarta (Galeana Street)
- Nuevo Vallarta (Vallarta Adventures)
- Nuevo Vallarta (Vallarta Adventures Pier) to Cabo Corrientes (Las Caletas)
- Cabo Corrientes (Las Caletas – Theatre)

In this leg's first Roadblock, one team member had to climb a crane located on a cliff over the sea and bungee jump from a platform 40 metres (130 ft) over the sea to receive their next clue.

This season's final Detour was a choice between Ascenso de Rana (Frog Ascent) or Escalera Loca (Crazy Ladder). For both Detour options, teams had to drive a four-wheel drive vehicle to their chosen location inside the adventure park. In Ascenso de Rana, one team member at a time had to use an ascender in order to climb a rope and reach a platform high above the ground in less than ten minutes. Once both team members were at the platform, they had to rappel down so they would receive their clue from the hands of the instructor. In Escalera Loca, one team member at a time had to climb a rope ladder in order to reach a platform high above the ground in less than ten minutes. Then, each team member had to rappel down, and once both reached the ground, they would get their next clue.

Additional tasks

- Teams had to find Don Regino near El Caballito on the Malecón, who would give them instructions to build a tower made by equilibrating stones of different shapes and sizes. Once teams had equilibrated the stones correctly to build a tower, Don Regino would hand them their next clue.
- At Galeana Street, teams had to dress up with Vallarta Adventure clothing and travel in one of their trucks to their installations.

=== Leg 12 [Part 2] (Mexico) ===
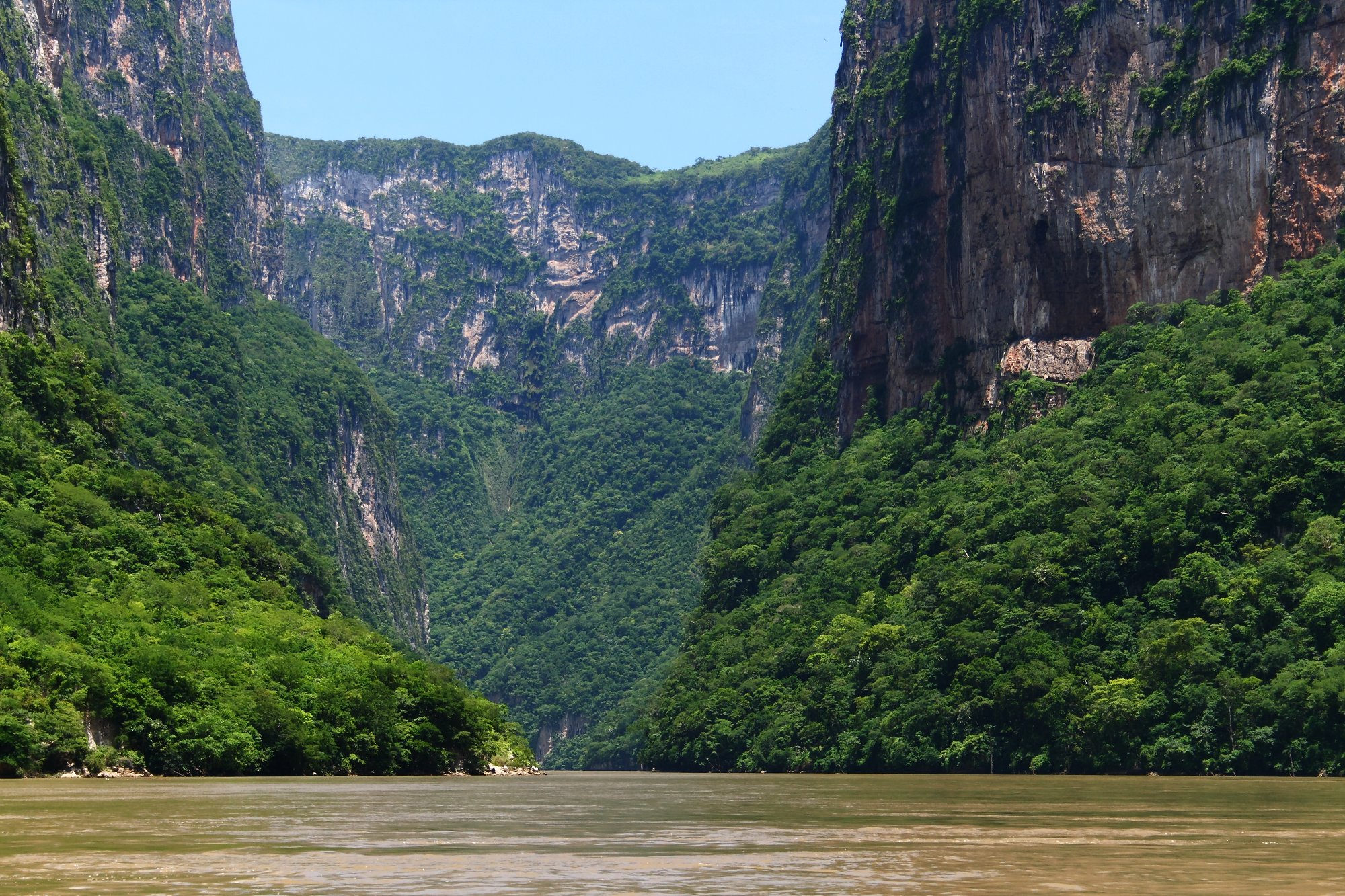
Teams visited the Sumidero Canyon in the southern state of Chiapas during the second half of the final leg.

Airdate: December 9, 2013

- Puerto Vallarta (Licenciado Gustavo Díaz Ordaz International Airport) to Tuxtla Gutiérrez (Ángel Albino Corzo International Airport)
- Tuxtla Gutiérrez (OCC Bus Terminal) to San Cristóbal de las Casas (OCC Bus Terminal)
- San Cristóbal de las Casas (Museo del Ámbar) (Overnight Rest)
- San Cristóbal de las Casas (San Cristobalito Church Stairs)
- San Cristóbal de las Casas (Public Market José Castillo Tielemans)
- San Cristóbal de las Casas (Casa de la Enseñanza)
- Chiapa de Corzo (Amikúu Park – Marina)
- Chiapa de Corzo (Amikúu Park – Sumidero Canyon)
- Chiapa de Corzo (Amikúu Park – Pier)
- Chiapa de Corzo (Amikúu Park – Museum)
- Chiapa de Corzo (Amikúu Park – Amphitheater)

In this season's final Roadblock, one team member had to choose a marked cart with twelve fruit crates and deliver them using the cart to twelve marked stalls in the market, in exchange for a stamp. Once the team member had all 12 stamps, they would receive their next clue.

Additional tasks

- At the Museo del Ámbar, teams were given a Samsung Galaxy S4 mobile phone and were instructed to take a picture of every location they received a clue using the Dualshot feature (Museo del Ámbar, San Cristobalito Church, Public Market José Castillo Tielemans (both before and after completing the Roadblock) and Casa de la Enseñanza). After taking the picture of the clue giver in Casa de la Enseñanza, he would check all the pictures and if they had all of them, teams would receive their next clue.
- At the San Cristobalito Church stairs, teams had to transport four wood log bundles from the bottom of the stairs to the top following the traditional Tzotzil method of carrying them attached to their heads and transporting only one at a time to receive their next clue from a Tzotzil woman.
- Teams had to pay with their Scotiabank card in order to enter the Amikúu Park.
- Teams had to kayak from the Sumidero Canyon to the pier of the Amikúu Park. Then, teams had to make their way on foot to the museum of the park, where they would find their next clue.
- At the Amikúu Park Museum, each team member had to answer two questions correctly that would give them a four number code that would be used to open a safe adding the letter A at the end of the code. The first team member had to answer the following questions: In how many Pit Stops there were more than one local greeter? (6), and Which is the number of the team that arrived 3rd at the 2nd leg Pit Stop? (9; Débora & Renata); While the second team member had to answer the following questions: The number of countries visited (6), minus the number of legs that took place on a Capital City (5), (6–5 = 1), and the number of aquatic transportations used during the season (5). Once teams had the correct code, 6915A, the safe would open and teams would receive their next clue.
