= Zipaquirá Cathedral =

Cathedral of the Most Holy Trinity, St. Anthony of Padua and Our Lady of Assumption of Zipaquirá
- Cathedral of the Most Holy Trinity, St. Anthony of Padua and Our Lady of Assumption of Zipaquirá
- Catedral de la Santísima Trinidad, San Antonio de Padua y Nuestra Señora de la Asunción de Zipaquirá
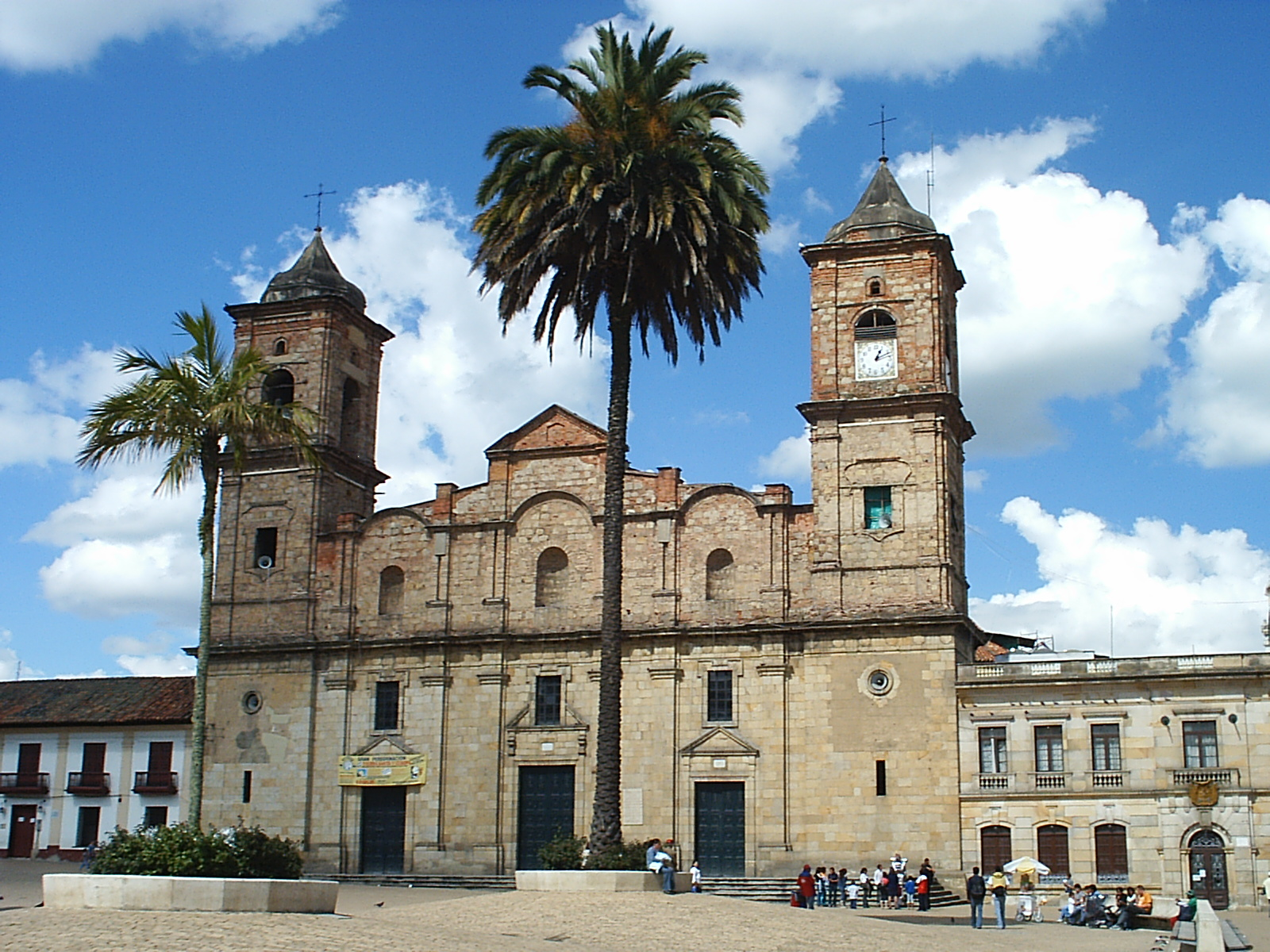
- View of the Cathedral

- Location of the Zipaquirá's Cathedral in Colombia
- 5°01′25″N 74°00′13″W
- Location: Zipaquirá, Cundinamarca
- Country: Colombia
- Denomination: Roman Catholic Church

History
- Status: National Monument
- Dedication: Holy Trinity; St. Anthony of Padua
- Consecrated: November 19, 1916

Architecture
- Architect: Domingo de Petres
- Groundbreaking: 1805
- Completed: 1916

Administration
- Province: Archdiocese of Bogotá
- Archdiocese: Roman Catholic Diocese of Zipaquirá
- Diocese: Roman Catholic Diocese of Zipaquirá

Clergy
- Archbishop: Luis José Rueda Aparicio
- Bishop: Héctor Cubillos Peña

The Cathedral of the Most Holy Trinity, St. Anthony of Padua and Our Lady of Assumption of Zipaquirá (Spanish: Catedral de la Santísima Trinidad, San Antonio de Padua y Nuestra Señora de la Asunción) also called Zipaquirá Cathedral is a cathedral church of Catholic worship dedicated under the joint patronage of the Holy Trinity and St. Anthony of Padua. It is located on the north side of the Comuneros Square, in the historic center of the city of Zipaquirá (Cundinamarca) in the South American country of Colombia.

== Description ==
It is the main temple of the Roman Catholic Diocese of Zipaquirá. The temple is better known simply as Parish of the Most Holy Trinity, St. Anthony of Padua and Our Lady of Assumption - Cathedral of Zipaquirá to distinguish it from the Salt Cathedral, which is located in the same municipality, this being actually a parish church and a tourist site and not a bishopric.

The cathedral was designed by the colonial Friar Domingo de Petrés (the same who designed the Primatial Cathedral of Bogotá, Cathedral of Santa Fé de Antioquia and the Cathedral of Facatativá), its construction began in 1805 and took 111 years to finalize, until it was inaugurated and consecrated on November 19, 1916 by the Archbishop of Bogotá, Bernardo Herrera Restrepo. The historic Zipaquirá sector (including the cathedral), was declared a National Monument of Colombia by resolution 002 of 12 March 1982.

== Gallery ==
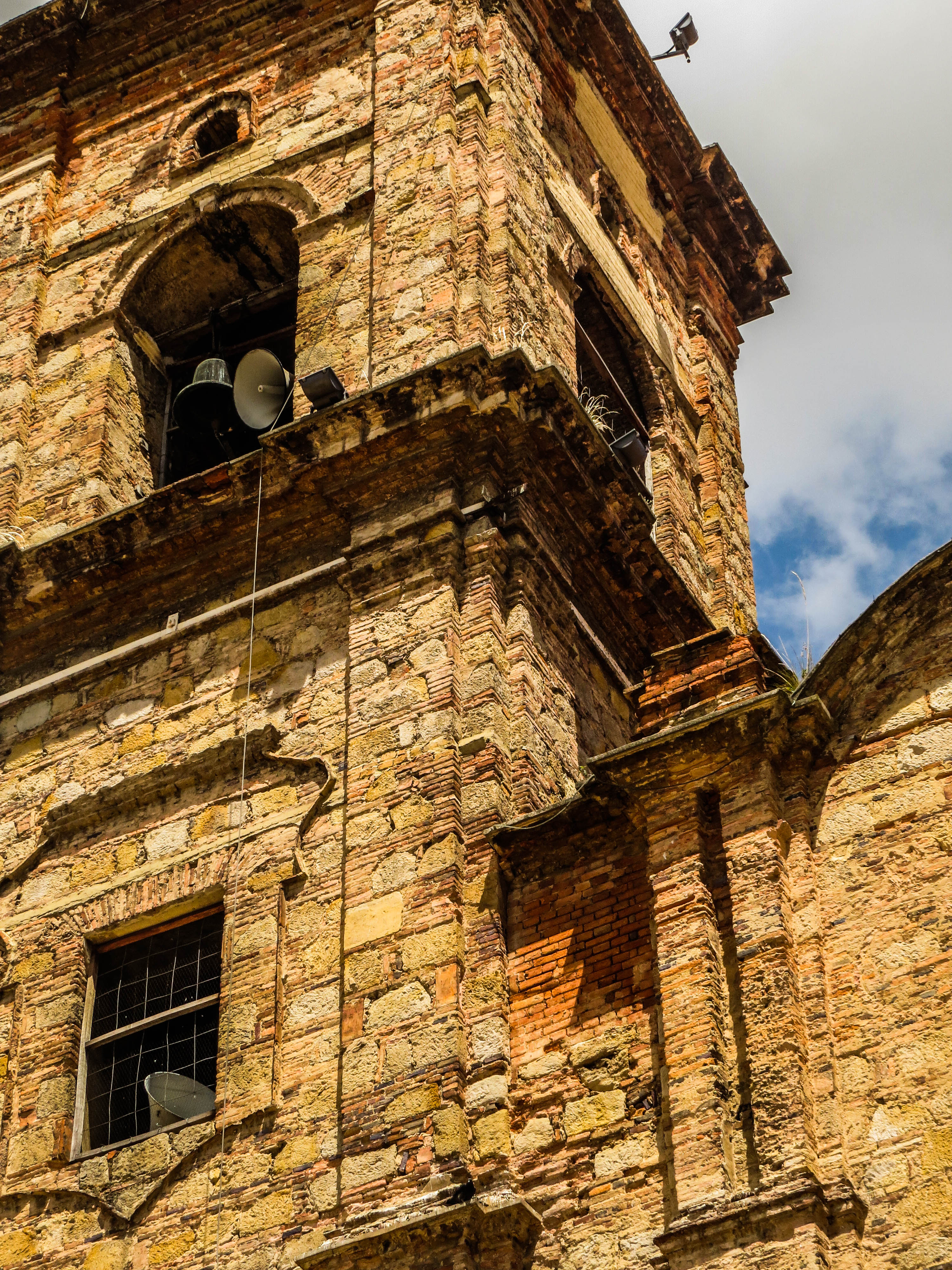
Western Bell Tower of the Cathedral

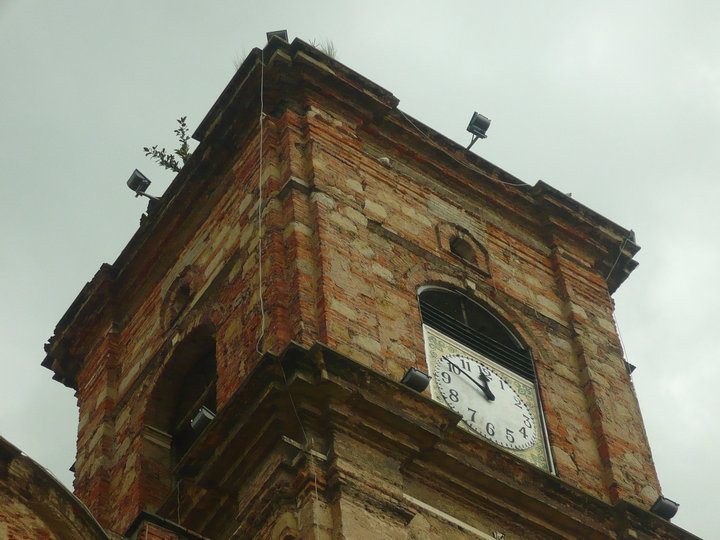
Oriental Tower Clock Tower of the Cathedral

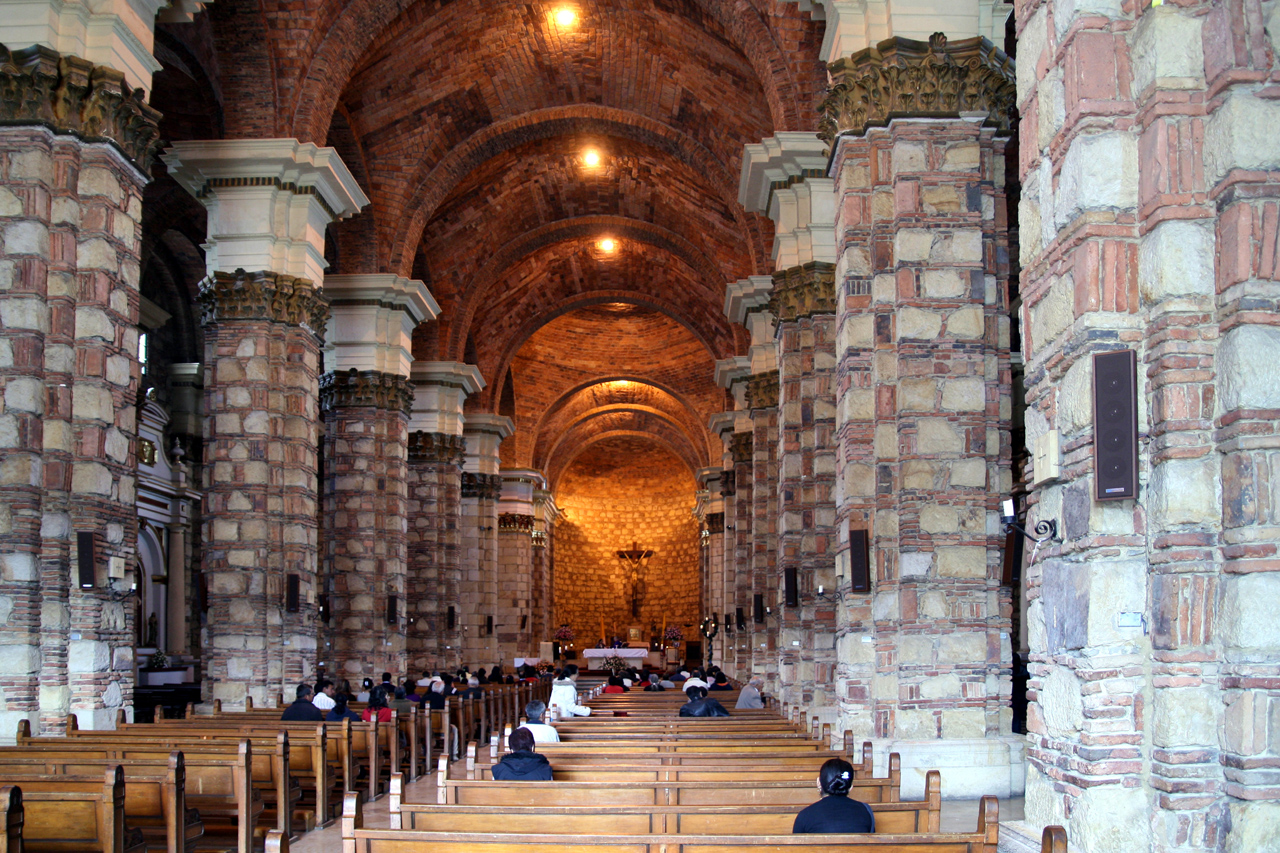
Inside the Cathedral

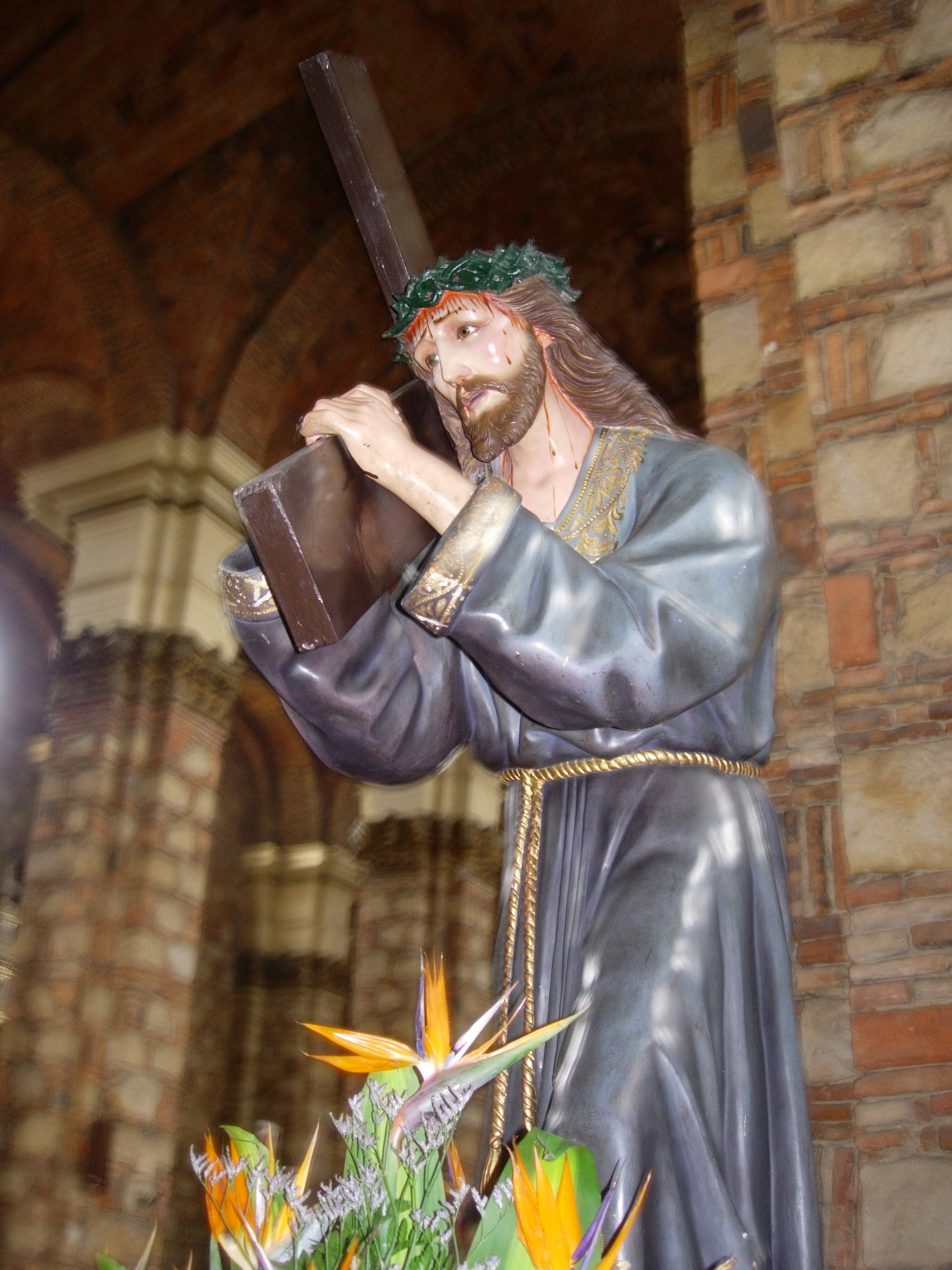
Nazarene inside the Cathedral

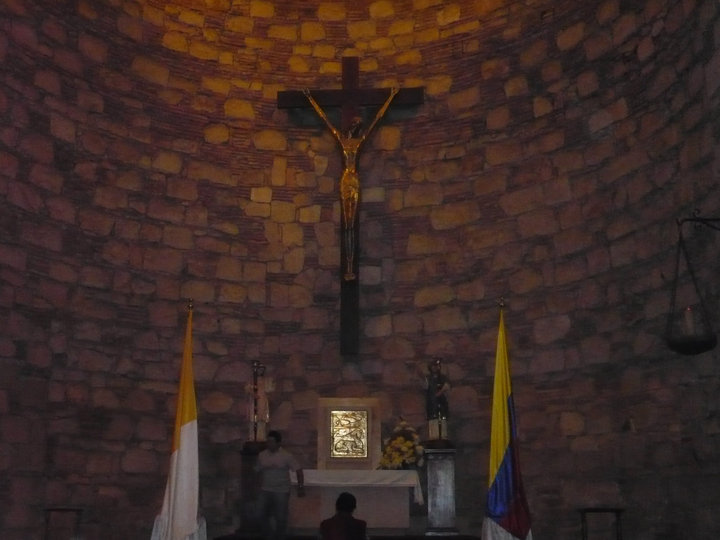
Christ of Gold in the Altar of the Cathedral

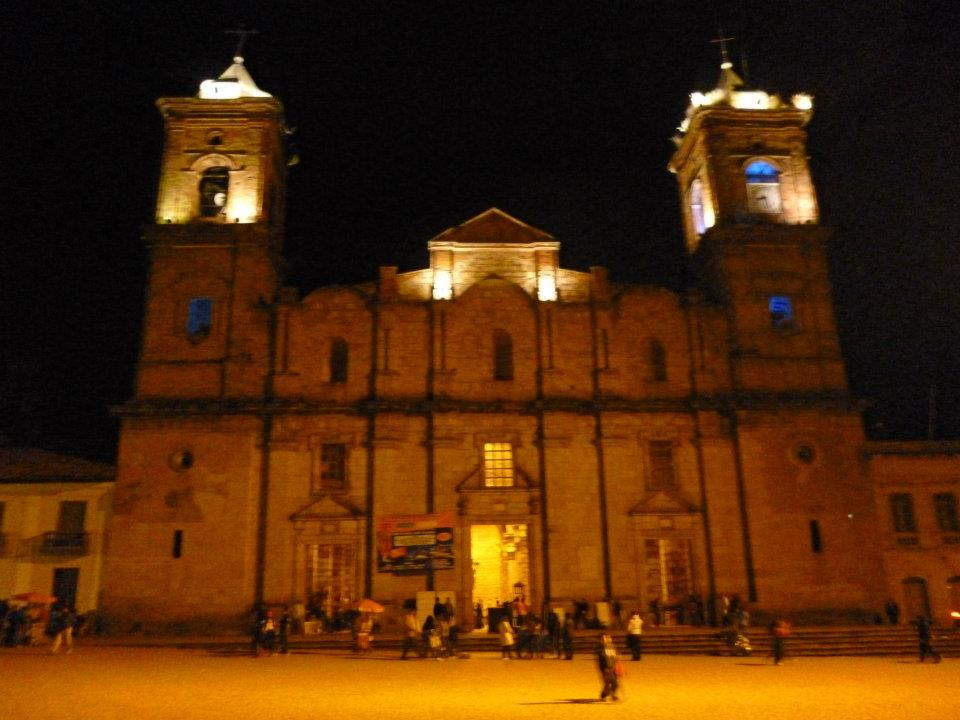
The Cathedral at night

== Gallery ==
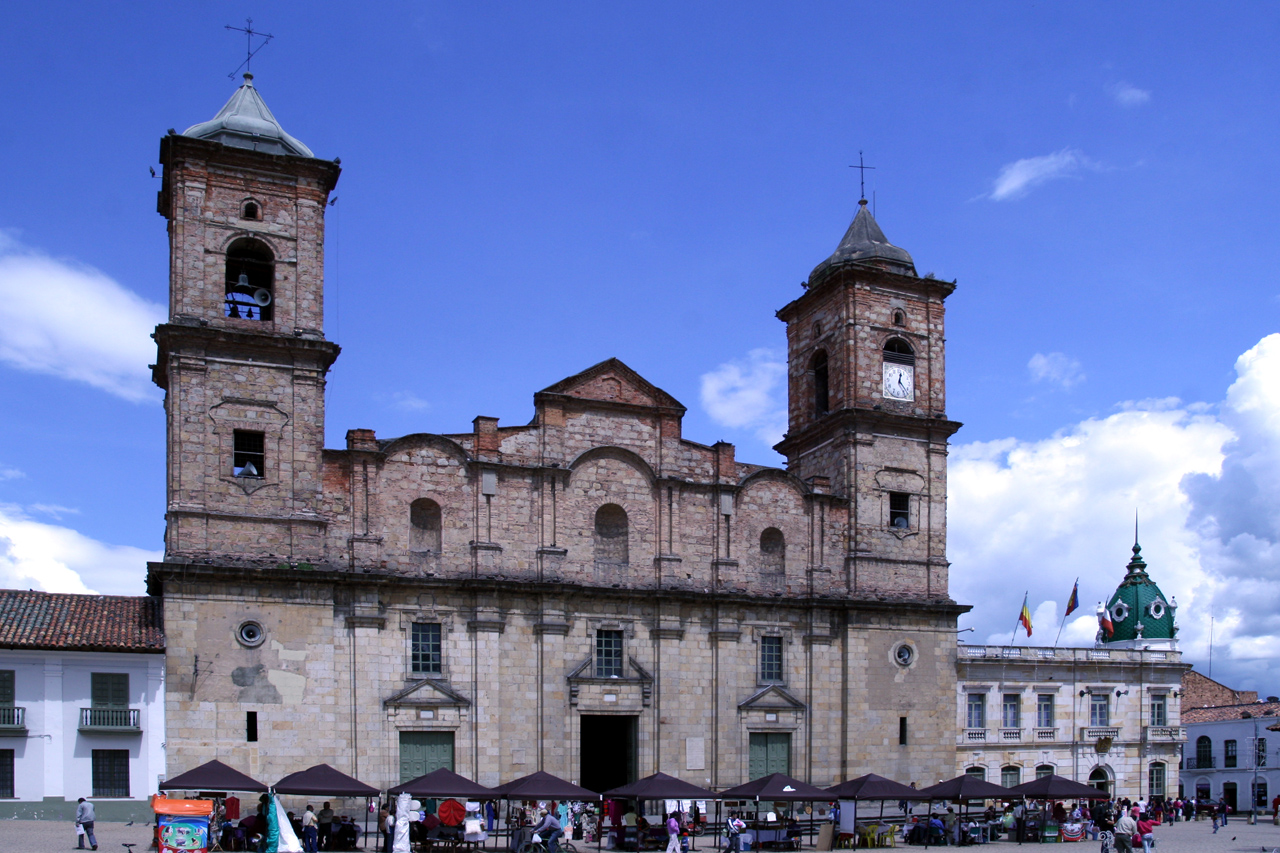
Cathedral

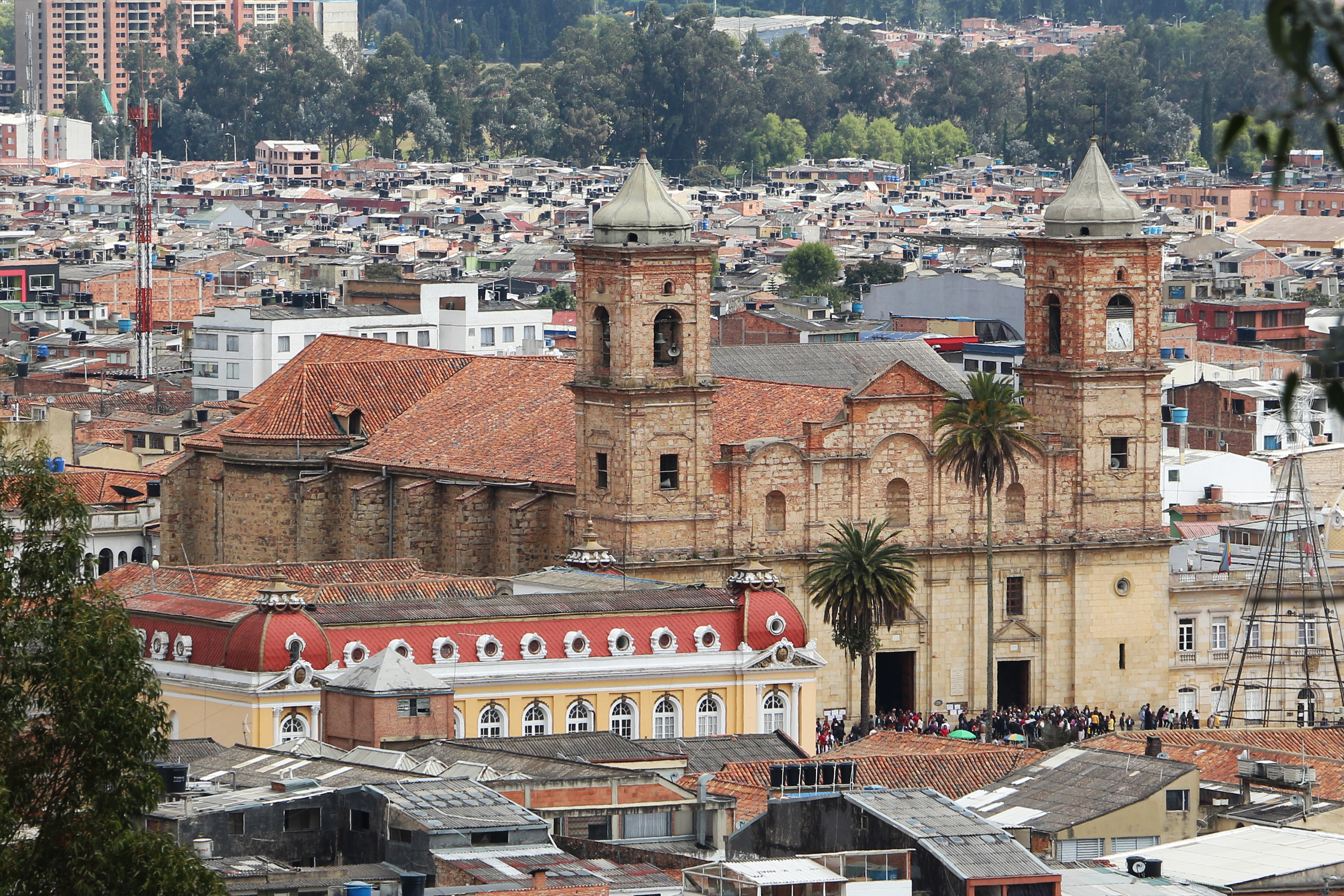
Remote view

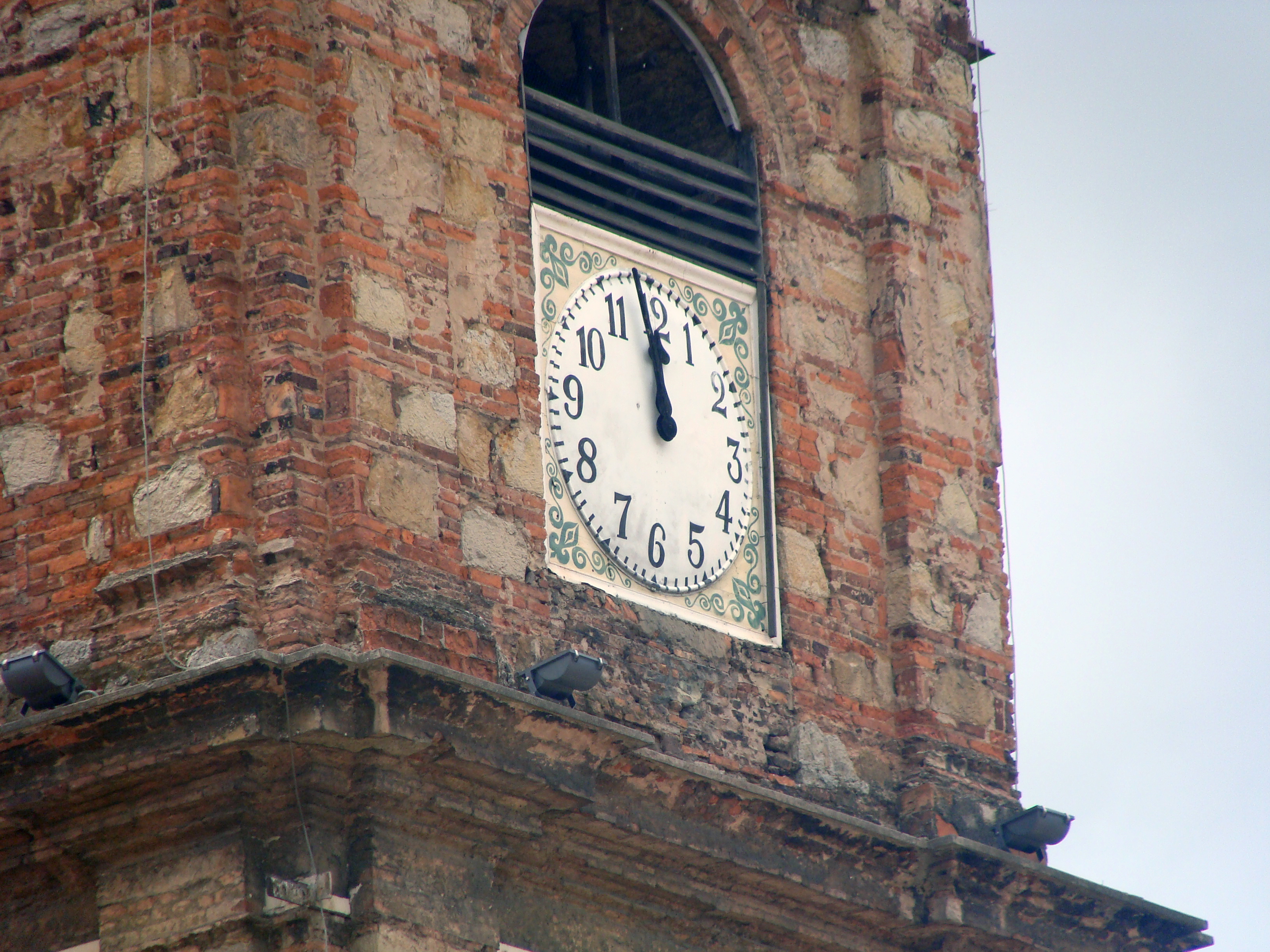
Clock

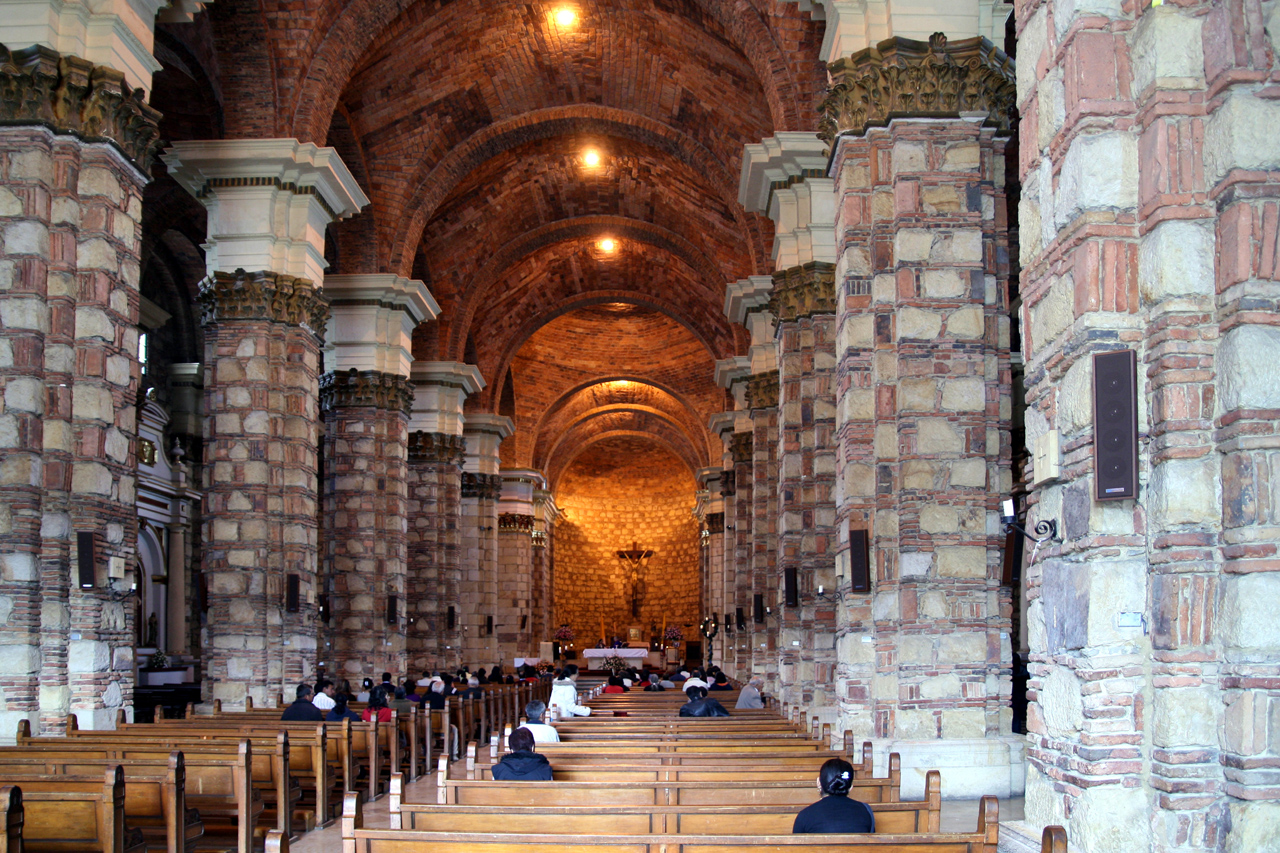
Interior

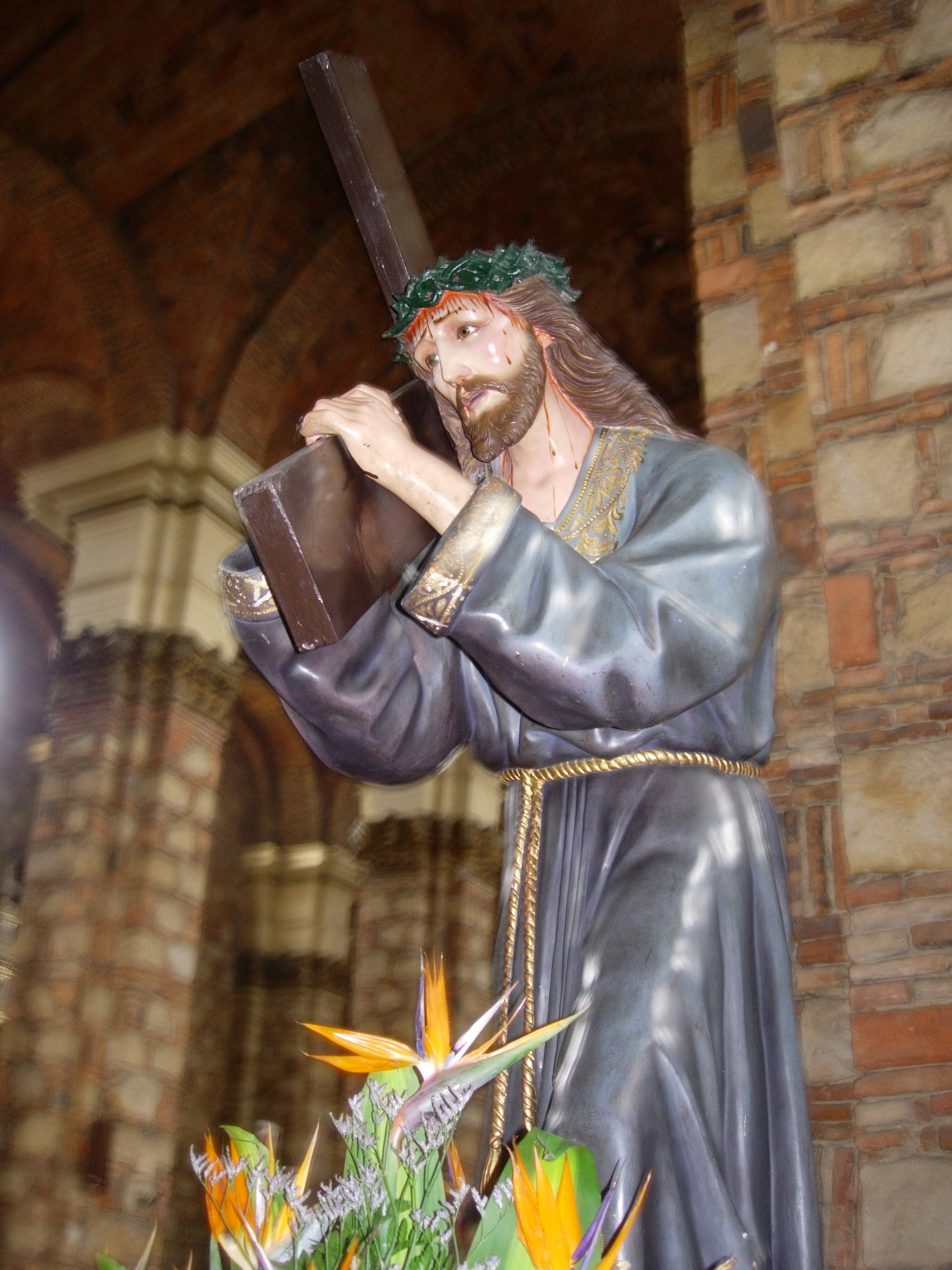
Jesus sculpture

== See also ==
- Roman Catholicism in Colombia
- Salt Cathedral of Zipaquirá
