= Puerta del Reloj =

City gate in Cartagena, Colombia

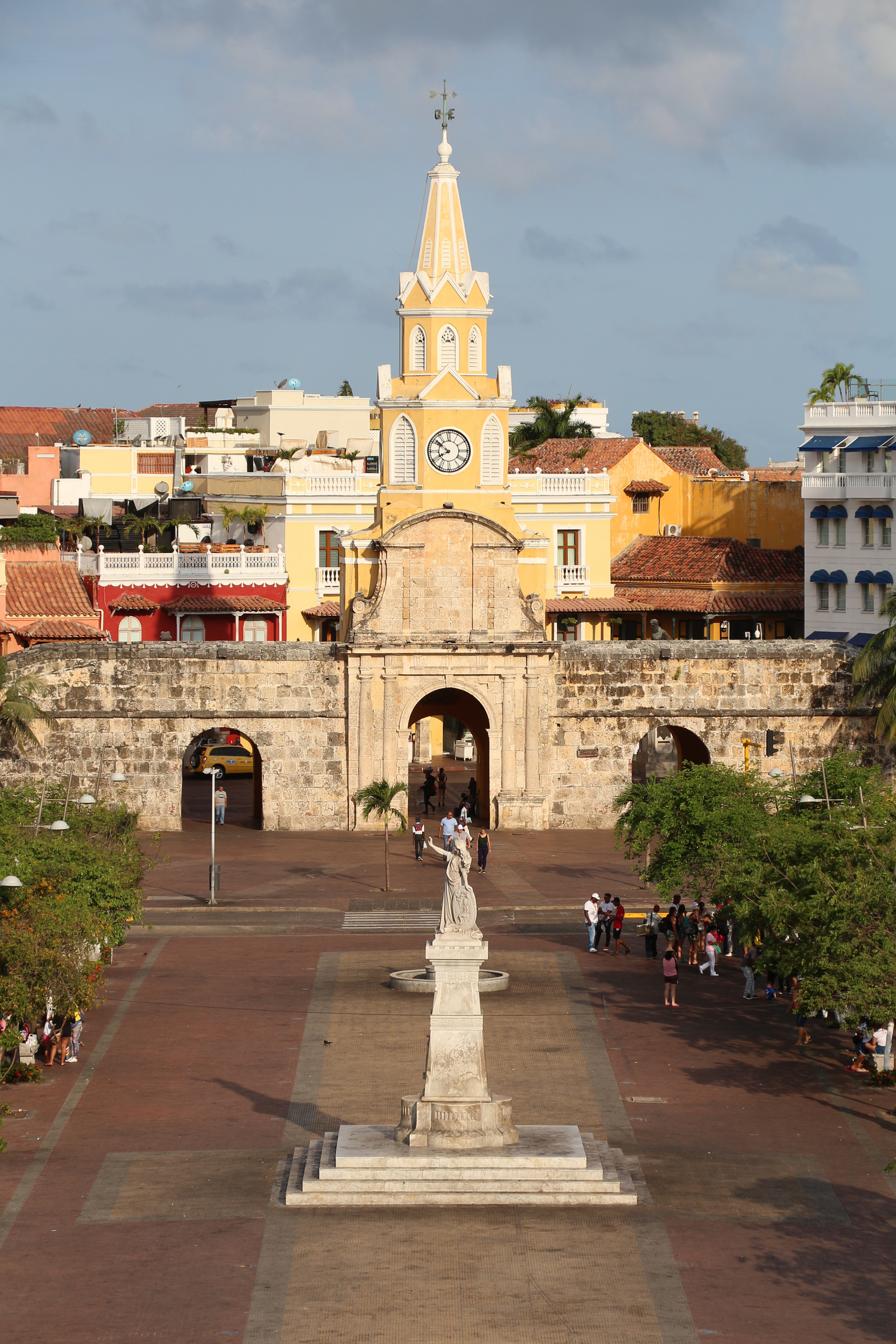
The second Puerta del Reloj, completed in 1738.

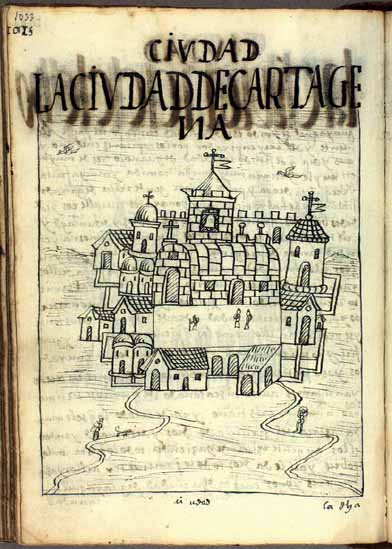
Cartagena de Indias in 1615 by the Inca painter Guamán Poma in his work "Nueva corónica y buen gobierno". Royal Library, Denmark. The early Puerta del Reloj is highlighted in the illustration.

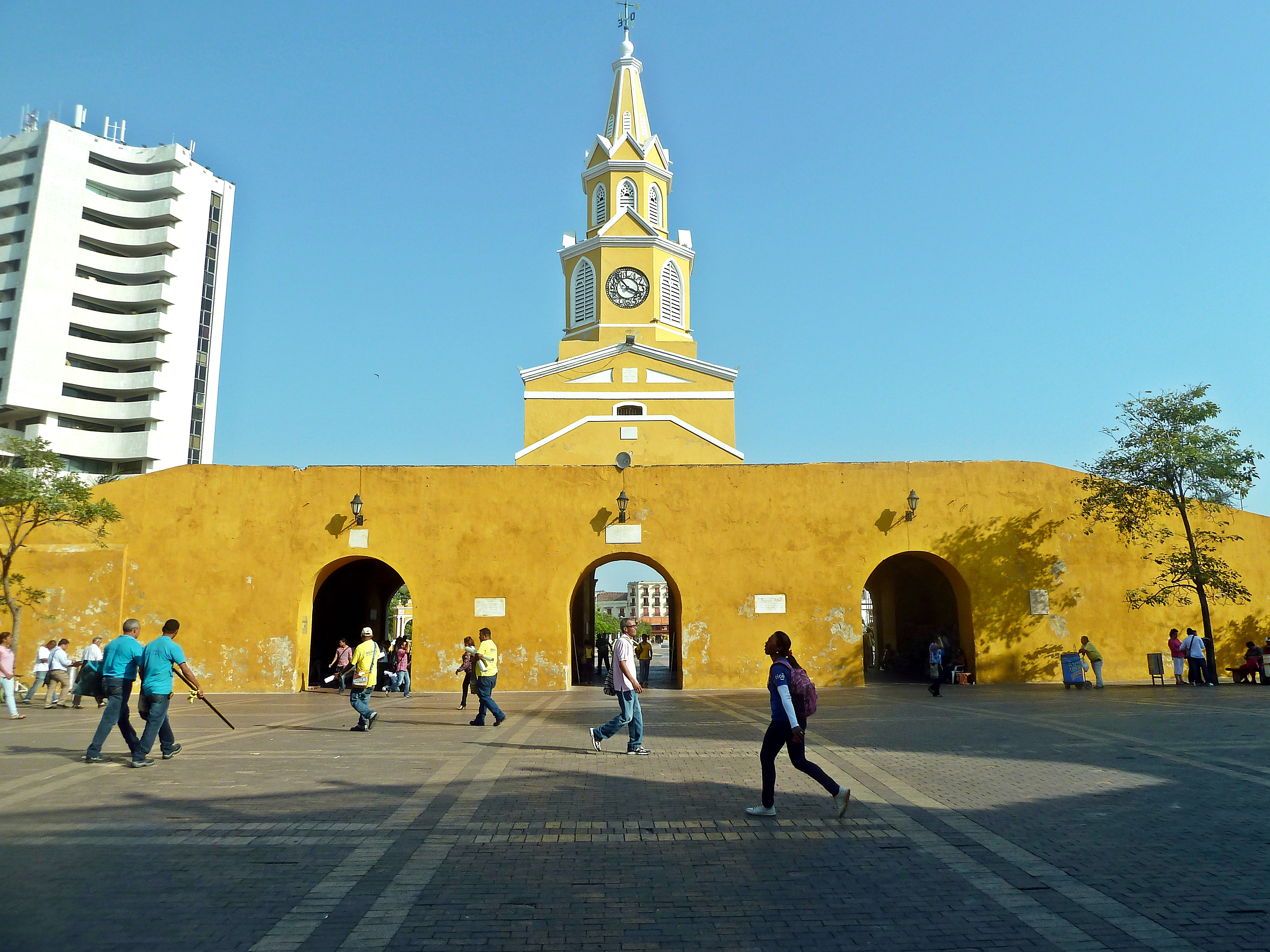
Back facade

The Puerta del Reloj (pronounced [ˈpweɾta ðel reˈlox]), Torre del Reloj (pronounced [ˈtore ðel reˈlox]) or Boca del Puente (pronounced [ˈboka ðel ˈpwente]) is the main city gate of the historic center of Cartagena de Indias, in Colombia and the original entrance of the fortified city. It is located between the squares Plaza de Independencia and Plaza de los Coches. The name "Puerta del Reloj" responds to the clock with which it was crowned at the beginning of the 18th century. While the name of Boca del Puente is due to the fact that during the colonial period, a drawbridge was raised at the foot of the channel of San Anastasio, which linked the walled city to the legendary Getsemaní neighborhood. In addition the bridge served like defense of the city, since in case of enemy attack, this one was raised to prevent the access of buccaneers and pirates.

Also the gate was protected by the bastions of San Pedro Apóstol (now disappeared) and the one of San Juan Bautista.

It has a Postclassic style in its facade, precursory of those that advocated the treaties on fortification of second half of 18th century. The Puerta del Reloj is the work of the Spanish military engineer Juan de Herrera y Sotomayor, founder of the Cartagena Academy, and its style recalls the facade of the main church of the Monasterio de San Francisco in the Colonial City of Santo Domingo. In fact both gates present a half-point Roman arch, flanked by two pairs of Tuscan columns, and the same entablature with a frieze decorated with triglyphs.

For the connoisseurs, this gate is one of the most successful works of the Spanish-American Fortification School and possibly one of the best preserved in the New World, as it strictly complies with the opinions of the Vauban school.

Among the locals this gate is known as Boca del Puente, but for non-natives of Cartagena it is simply the Puerta del Reloj.

== History ==
Built between 1704 and 1738, Herrera undertook the repair of the 1631 "Puerta del Puente" or Gate of the Bridge, which overlooked a wooden bridge dating from 1540. This was a wooden viaduct that passed over the Caño de San Anastasio, a seawater rivulet separating the island of Getsemaní from the island of Calamarí.

== Gallery ==
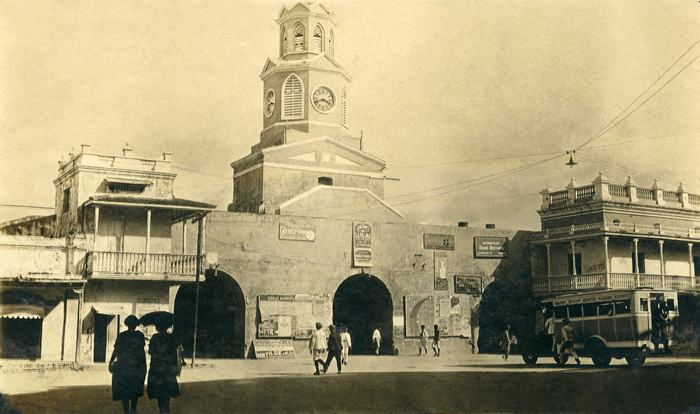
Puerta del Reloj in 1920.

== See also ==
- List of colonial buildings in Cartagena, Colombia
