= The Amazing Race 3 (Latin American season) =

Season of television series

- Season 3
- Presented by: Harris Whitbeck
- No. of teams: 11
- Winners: Cristóbal & Nicolás Brain
- No. of legs: 12
- Distance traveled: 13,900 km (8,600 mi)
- No. of episodes: 13

Release
- Original network: Space
- Original release: 25 September – 18 December 2011

Additional information
- Filming dates: 12 July – 2 August 2011

Series chronology
- ← Previous; Season 2 (on Discovery Latin America) Next → Season 4

The Amazing Race 3 (also known as The Amazing Race on Space) is the third season of the Latin American version of the reality television game show based on the American series of the same name, The Amazing Race. This season was the first to air on the Space channel in association with Disney Media Networks Latin America. It featured eleven teams of two, with a pre-existing relationship, in a race across Latin America to win US$250,000.

Harris Whitbeck returned as the host for this third season. The third season premiered on 25 September 2011 at 9:00 p.m. (UTC-3) on Space and TNT. The season finale aired on Space and TNT on 18 December 2011 at 9:00 p.m. (UTC-3).

Chilean twins Cristóbal and Nicolás Brain were the winners of this season.

== Production ==
=== Development and filming ===
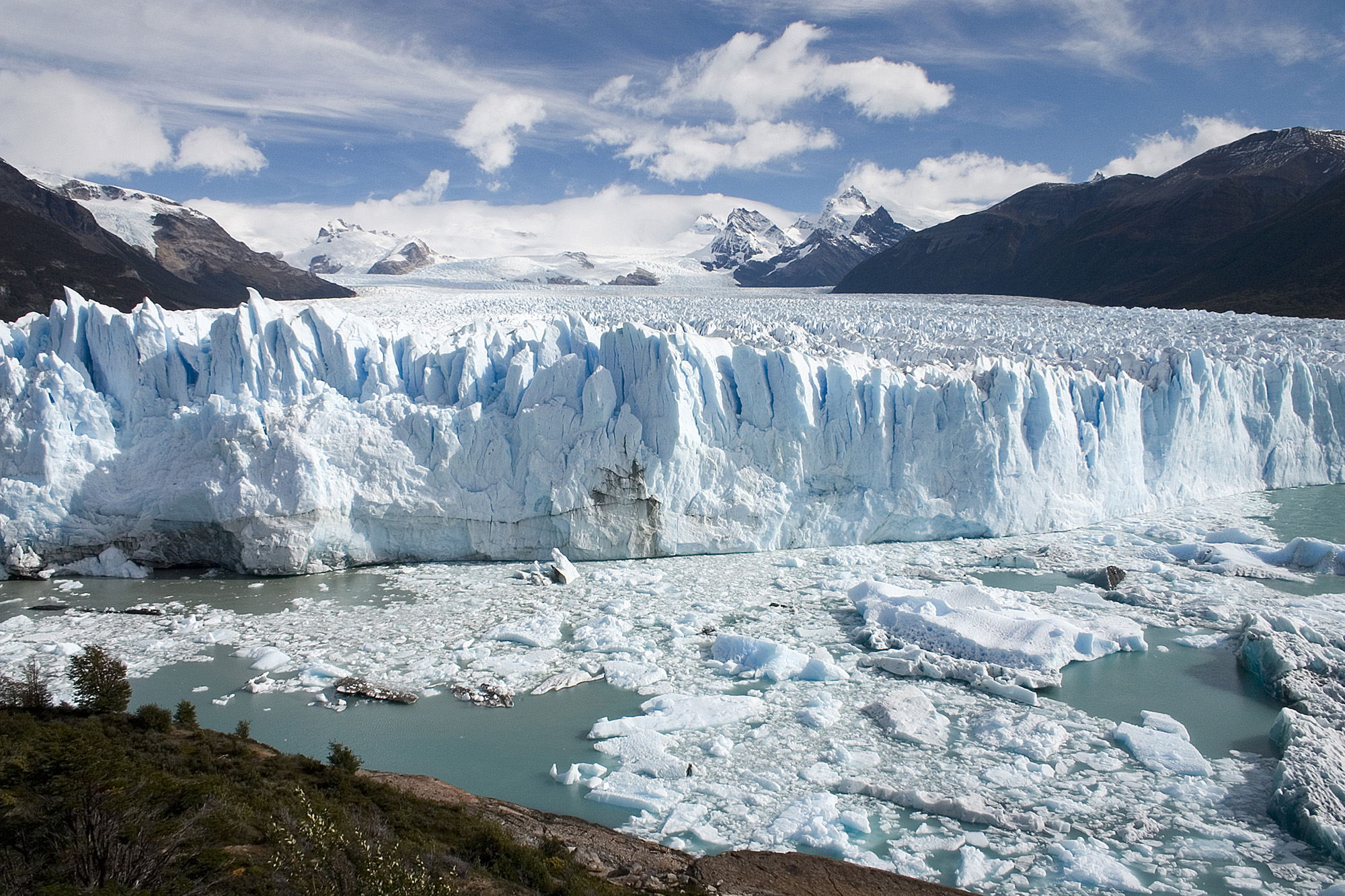
The season's Starting Line was at the Perito Moreno Glacier in the Los Glaciares National Park, Argentina.

Space greenlit the third season of the series in January 2011. Filming for this third season took place from 12 July 2011 to 2 August 2011. The third season was broadcast in high-definition television on Space HD.

Filming for the third season lasted for 22 days and covered nearly 13,900 km (8,600 miles). The third season spanned five countries in one continent. Among them, only one is an unvisited country, Uruguay. Previously visited countries were Argentina, Chile, Ecuador and Brazil.

This season adopted the colors from original American version with red and yellow route markers, yellow clue envelopes, and a green and black Pit Stop mat.

The only team present at the Finish Line was Mexican married couple, Rick & Kathy, who were eliminated in Brazil (the country where the Finish Line was located).

=== Casting ===
Applications were accepted from 20 February 2011 and ended on late April 2011.

== Cast ==
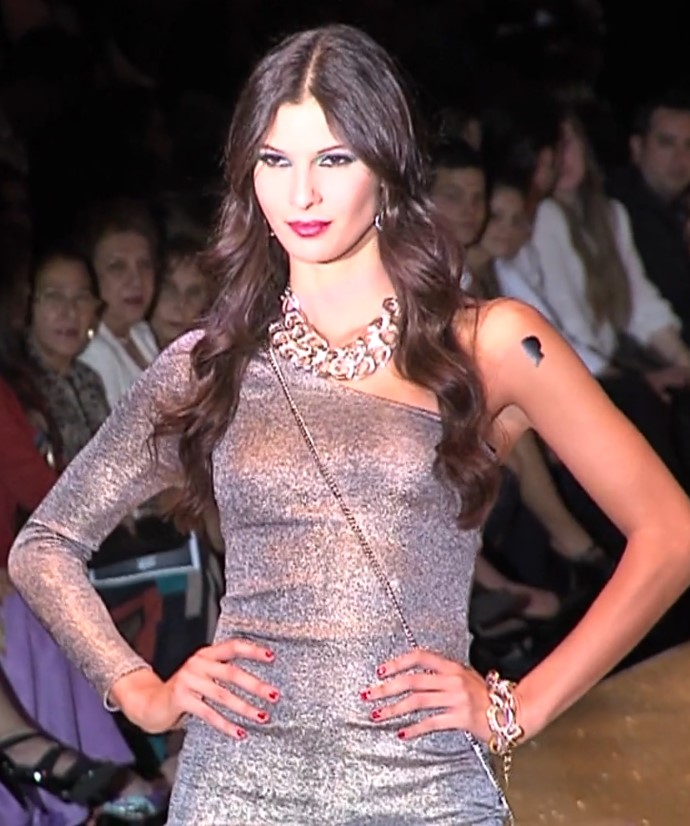
Contestant Toya Montoya, who would return to host the fifth and sixth seasons.

This season included eleven teams from Argentina, Chile, Colombia, Mexico, Peru, Venezuela and for the first time Costa Rica and Ecuador. As a result, Brazil was not represented for the first time in this version. The cast includes Colombian television host and model Toya Montoya and her boyfriend Juan del Mar, a pair of identical twins (Guillermo & Gabriel from season one were non-identical twins), the series first team composed of cousins, and the first sisters-in-law team.

Contestants	Age	Relationship	Hometown	Status
Ale Fundaro	49	Dating	Córdoba, Argentina	Eliminated 1st (in Buenos Aires, Argentina)
Eze Ball	48	Dating	Córdoba, Argentina	Eliminated 1st (in Buenos Aires, Argentina)
Vero Alvarado	24	Friends	Cagua, Venezuela	Eliminated 2nd (in Tigre, Argentina)
Gaba Cardozo	24	Friends	Turmero, Venezuela	Eliminated 2nd (in Tigre, Argentina)
Mónica Ramos	45	Sisters-in-law	Guadalajara, Mexico	Eliminated 3rd (in Colonia del Sacramento, Uruguay)
Rosy Aragón	47	Sisters-in-law	Guadalajara, Mexico	Eliminated 3rd (in Colonia del Sacramento, Uruguay)
Juan "Pablo" Rivera	33	Friends	Cuenca, Ecuador	Eliminated 4th (in Santiago, Chile)
Leonor "Rosario" Vegas	40	Friends	Loja, Ecuador	Eliminated 4th (in Santiago, Chile)
Andre Cino	21	Siblings	Lima, Peru	Eliminated 5th (in San Pedro de Atacama, Chile)
Nico Cino	26	Siblings	Lima, Peru	Eliminated 5th (in San Pedro de Atacama, Chile)
José Varela	31	Dating	San José, Costa Rica	Eliminated 6th (in Antofagasta, Chile)
Marisol Ortiz	30	Dating	San José, Costa Rica	Eliminated 6th (in Antofagasta, Chile)
María "Toya" Montoya	29	Dating	Bogotá, Colombia	Eliminated 7th (in Mindo, Ecuador)
Juan del Mar Iglesias	40	Dating	Bogotá, Colombia	Eliminated 7th (in Mindo, Ecuador)
Rick Bagarrán	40	Married	Puerto Vallarta, Mexico	Eliminated 8th (in Salvador, Brazil)
Kathy Farah	36	Married	Puerto Vallarta, Mexico	Eliminated 8th (in Salvador, Brazil)
Maxi Ottaviani	26	Cousins	Buenos Aires, Argentina	Third Place
Demi Bellido	25	Cousins	Buenos Aires, Argentina	Third Place
Felipe Castro	33	Friends/Doctors	Bogotá, Colombia	Second Place
Alejandro Soler	34	Friends/Doctors	Bogotá, Colombia	Second Place
Nicolás Brain	26	Twins	Santiago, Chile	Winners
Cristóbal Brain	26	Twins	Santiago, Chile	Winners

=== Future appearances ===
Montoya would later host the series starting with the fifth season, becoming the first female host in the whole Amazing Race franchise.

== Results ==
The following teams participated in the season, with their relationships at the time of filming. Note that this table is not necessarily reflective of all content broadcast on television due to inclusion or exclusion of some data. Placements are listed in finishing order:

Team	Position (by leg)												
Team	1	2	3	4	5	6	7	8	9	10	11	12^{7}	
Nicolás & Cristóbal	2nd	4th	3rd	3rd	3rd	3rd	3rd	1st^	1stƒ	1st	1st	2nd	1st
Felipe & Alejandro	1st	2nd	1st	1st	1st	1st	5thε^{4}	4th+^{5}	4th	2nd^{6}	2nd	3rd	2nd
Demi & Maxi	7th	9th	8th	6th	5th	4th	2nd	2nd+	2nd	3rd^{6}	3rd	1st	3rd
Rick & Kathy	9th	7th	7th	8th	6th	5th	1st	3rd–	3rd	4th^{6}	4th		
Juan del Mar & Toya	3rd	1st	2nd	2nd	2nd	2nd	6th	5th–^{5}	5th	5th			
José & Marisol	4th	5th	4th	4th	7th	7th	4th	6th^					
Nico & Andre	5th	3rd	5th	5th^{1}	4th	6th	7th						
Pablo & Rosario	6th	6th	6th	7th	8th^{2}	8th^{3}							
Mónica & Rosy	8th	8th	9th	9th									
Vero & Gaba	11th	10th	10th										
Ale & Eze	10th	11th											

Key

- A red team placement indicates that the team was eliminated.
- A green ƒ indicates that the team won a Fast Forward.
- A purple ε indicates that the team decided to use the Express Pass on that leg.
- An underlined blue team placement indicates that the team came in last on a non-elimination leg and had to perform a Speed Bump in the next leg.
- A yellow > indicates that the team chose to use the Yield; < indicates the team who received it; <> around the leg number indicates that the Yield for that leg was available but not used.
- A brown ⊃ indicates means the team chose to use a U-Turn; ⊂ indicates the team who received it; ⊂⊃ indicates that the U-Turn for that leg was available but not used. A cyan ⋑ indicates that the team chose to the second U-Turn in a Double U-Turn; ⋐ indicates the team who received it; ⊂ and ⋑ around a leg number indicates that neither of the two available U-Turns in a Double U-Turn were used.
- Matching colored symbols (orange +, teal ^, and magenta –) indicate teams who worked together during part of the leg as a result of an Intersection.
- An underlined leg number indicates that there was no mandatory rest period at the Pit Stop and all teams were ordered to continue racing. The first place team was still awarded a prize for that leg. An underlined team placement indicates that the team came in last, was ordered to continue racing, and had to perform a Speed Bump in the next leg.
- Italicized results indicate the position of the team at the midpoint of a two-episode leg.

Notes

1. Nico & Andre initially arrived 5th, but were issued a 15-minute penalty as Andre lost her Uruguayan arrival-departure document. This did not affect their placement.
2. Pablo & Rosario initially arrived 6th, but were issued a 15-minute penalty as Pablo popped his balloon and didn't go to get a new one in the Detour. Rick & Kathy and José & Marisol checked in during the penalty time, dropping Pablo & Rosario placement to last place; however, they were notified the Leg was non-elimination, and the remaining penalty would be assessed at the start of the next Leg.
3. Pablo & Rosario did not complete the Detour. Already in last place, Pablo & Rosario proceeded to the Pit Stop where they checked in and were eliminated without the penalty being issued.
4. Felipe & Alejandro elected to use the Express Pass to bypass an additional task in the Puritama hot springs in Leg 7.
5. ^^{a} ^{b} Felipe & Alejandro and Juan del Mar & Toya initially arrived 3rd and 4th, respectively, but both teams were issued 15-minute penalties as they were caught speeding. Their placements were dropped to 4th and 5th place, respectively.
6. ^^{a} ^{b} ^{c} Felipe & Alejandro, Demi & Maxi, and Rick & Kathy initially arrived in 2nd, 3rd, and 4th, respectively, but each team were issued 1-hour penalties as they were caught speeding. This did not affect either team's final placements.
7. Leg 12 was a double-length leg. It featured a Virtual Pit Stop, and had one Detour (first half) and two Roadblocks shown over two episodes.

== Prizes ==
Individual prizes were awarded to the winner of the first leg and to the top three teams.

- Leg 1 – The Express Pass (Pase Directo) – an item that can be used to skip any task of the team's choosing.
- Leg 12:
  - 1st Place – US$250,000
  - 2nd Place – A seven-day trip for two to Antigua, Guatemala.
  - 3rd Place – A four-day trip for two to Anaheim, California, United States.

== Race summary ==
Route Map.

Destinations	Air travel Rail travel Water travel Bus travel Helicopter travel Bicycle travel Gondola travel
Route Markers	Desvío (Detour) Obstáculo (Roadblock) Avance (Fast Forward) Alto (Yield); Intersección (Intersection) Retorno (U-Turn) Multa (Speed Bump) Parada (Pit Stop)

=== Leg 1 (Argentina) ===
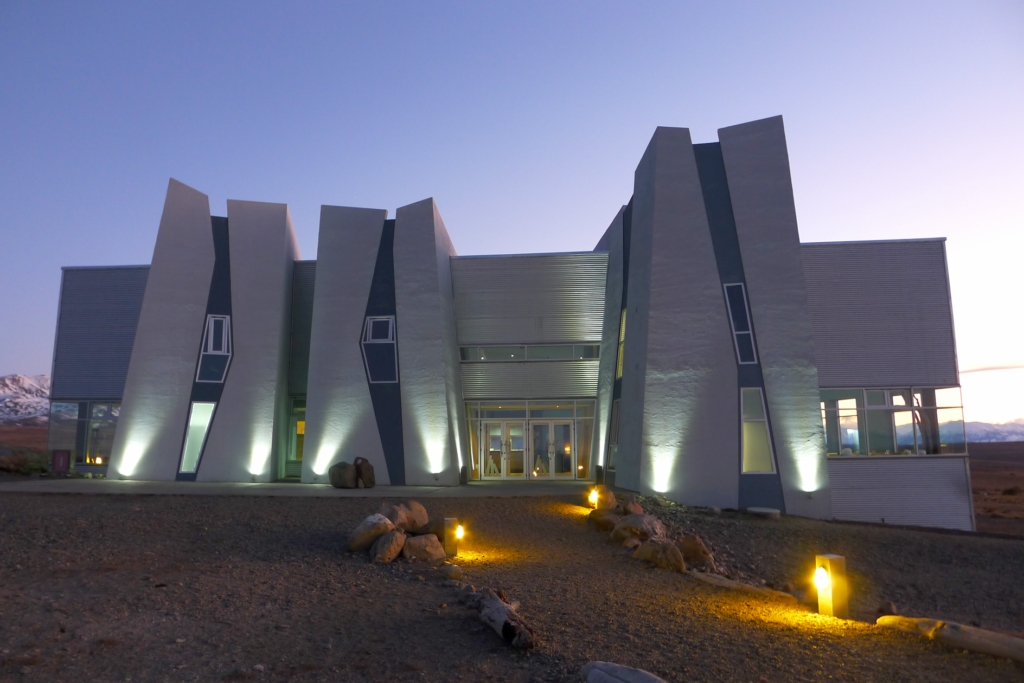
The Glaciarium in El Calafate was the Pit Stop for the first leg.

Airdate: September 25, 2011

- Los Glaciares National Park, Argentina (Perito Moreno Glacier) (Starting Line)
- El Calafate (Estancia Bon Accord)
- El Calafate (Hotel Alto Calafate) (Overnight Rest)
- El Calafate (Estancia Alice – Cerro Frías Refuge)
- El Calafate (Glaciarium)

This season's first Detour was a choice between Fardos (Bales) or Esquilar (Shear). In Fardos, teams had to roll a 200-kilogram (440 lb) bale through a marked muddy course to receive their next clue. In Esquilar, teams had to shear the wool off of a sheep using special scissors to receive their next clue.

In this season's first Roadblock, one team member had to go through a zipline course. After completing the course, they had to correctly split a log into two using an ax to receive their next clue.

Additional task

- At Hotel Alto Calafate, teams had to sign up for a departure time for the following morning when they would receive their next clue.

=== Leg 2 (Argentina) ===
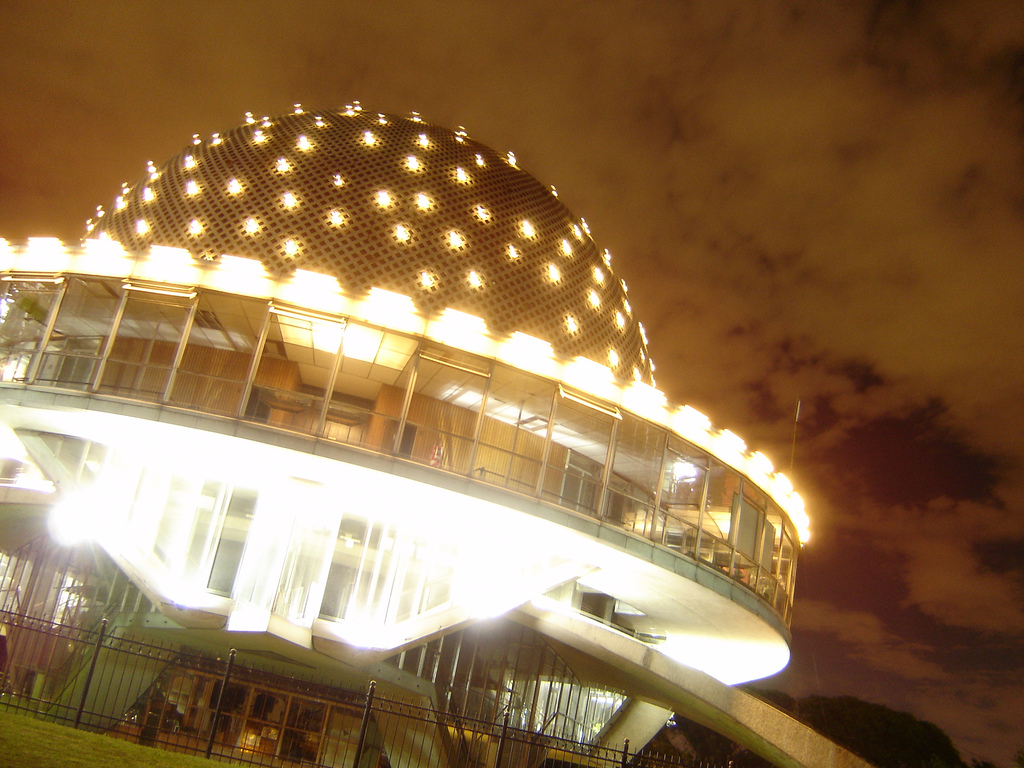
The Galileo Galilei Planetarium was visited during this second leg.

Airdate: October 2, 2011

- El Calafate (El Calafate Bus Terminal) to Buenos Aires (Retiro Bus Station)
- Buenos Aires (Galileo Galilei Planetarium)
- Buenos Aires (Il Ballo del Mattone Restaurant)
- Buenos Aires (Zivals Record Store or Andrés Bello Book Store)
- Buenos Aires (Club del Halcón Peregrino)
- Buenos Aires (Puente de la Mujer)

This leg's Detour was a choice between CDs or Libros (Books). In CDs, teams had to make their way to the Zivals record store search for a CD with a four-word son in its playlist to receive their next clue. In Libros, teams were given a biography of an author and then they had to search a bookstore for a book by that specific writer to receive their next clue.

For their Speed Bump, Vero & Gaba had to cut 5 kilograms (11 lb) of onions before they could continue racing.

In this leg's Roadblock, one team member had to use a bow and arrow to burst a balloon to receive their next clue.

Additional task

- After completing the Roadblock, teams had to find a specific bus stop, where they had to take bus 111 which would take them near Puente de la Mujer. Once there, teams had to walk along a specific street and then go across a bridge before checking in at the Pit Stop.

=== Leg 3 (Argentina) ===
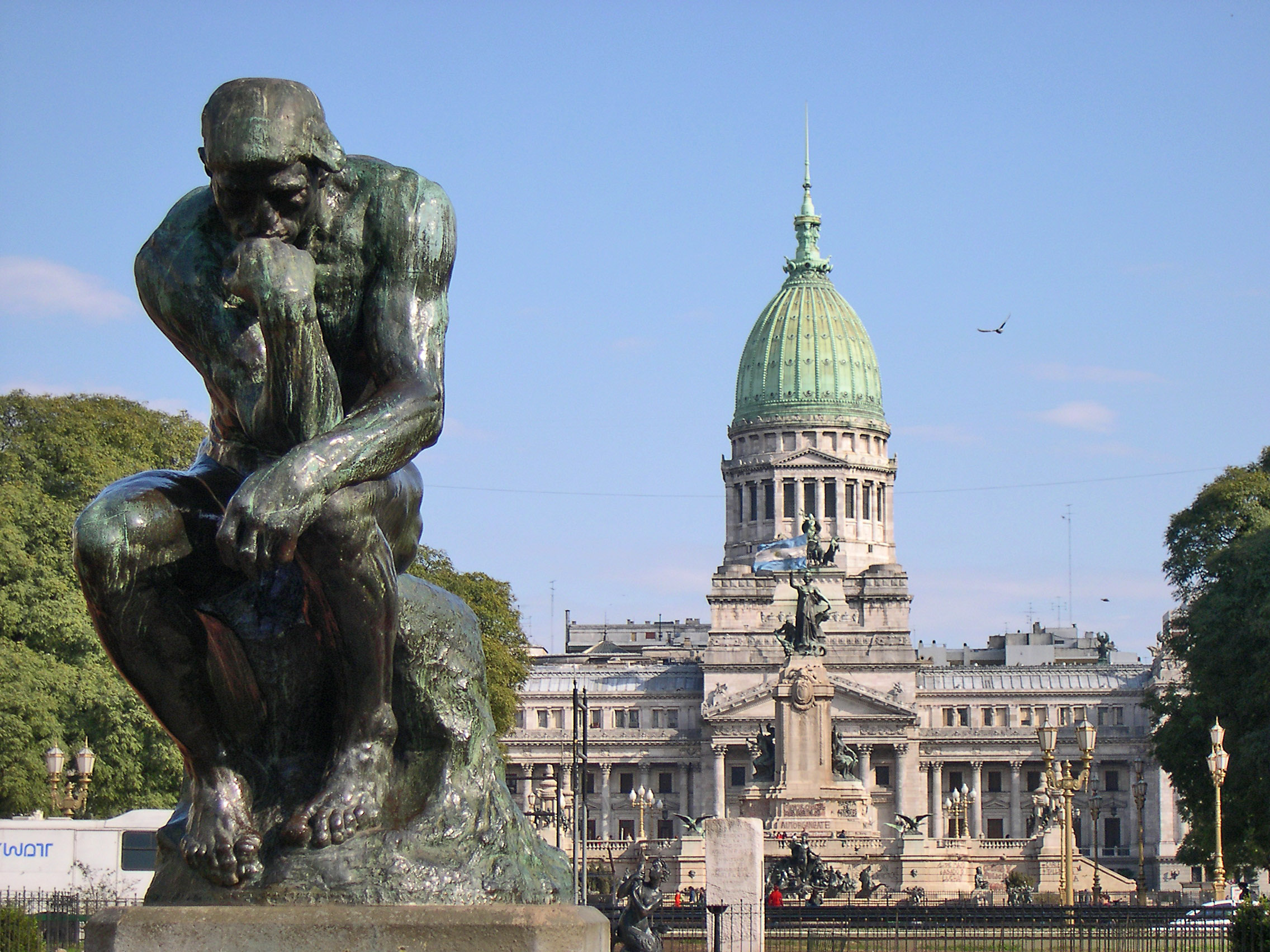
The season's first U-Turn was located at the Congressional Plaza.

Airdate: October 9, 2011

- Buenos Aires (Club Catalinas Sur)
- Buenos Aires (Escuela del Circo Criollo)
- Buenos Aires (Congressional Plaza)
- Buenos Aires (La Bicicleta Naranja)
- Buenos Aires (Estación Retiro) to Tigre (Estación Tigre (in Spanish))
- Tigre (Monumento al Remero (in Spanish) to Tigre Art Museum)

In this leg's Roadblock, one team member had to jump off a 50-metre (160 ft) bungee to receive their next clue.

This leg's Detour was a choice between Cama Elástica (Trampoline) or Palos Chinos (Chinese Sticks). In Cama Elástica, one of the team members had to jump in the trampoline to reach their next clue, which was hanging from the roof. In Palos Chinos, one of the team members had to climb a pole and get their next clue, which was at the top of the pole.

Additional tasks

- In La Bicicleta Naranja, teams had to assemble a bike, and then ride it before receiving their next clue.
- After visiting Monumento al Remero, teams had to kayak along the river to get to their next Pit Stop.

=== Leg 4 (Argentina → Uruguay) ===
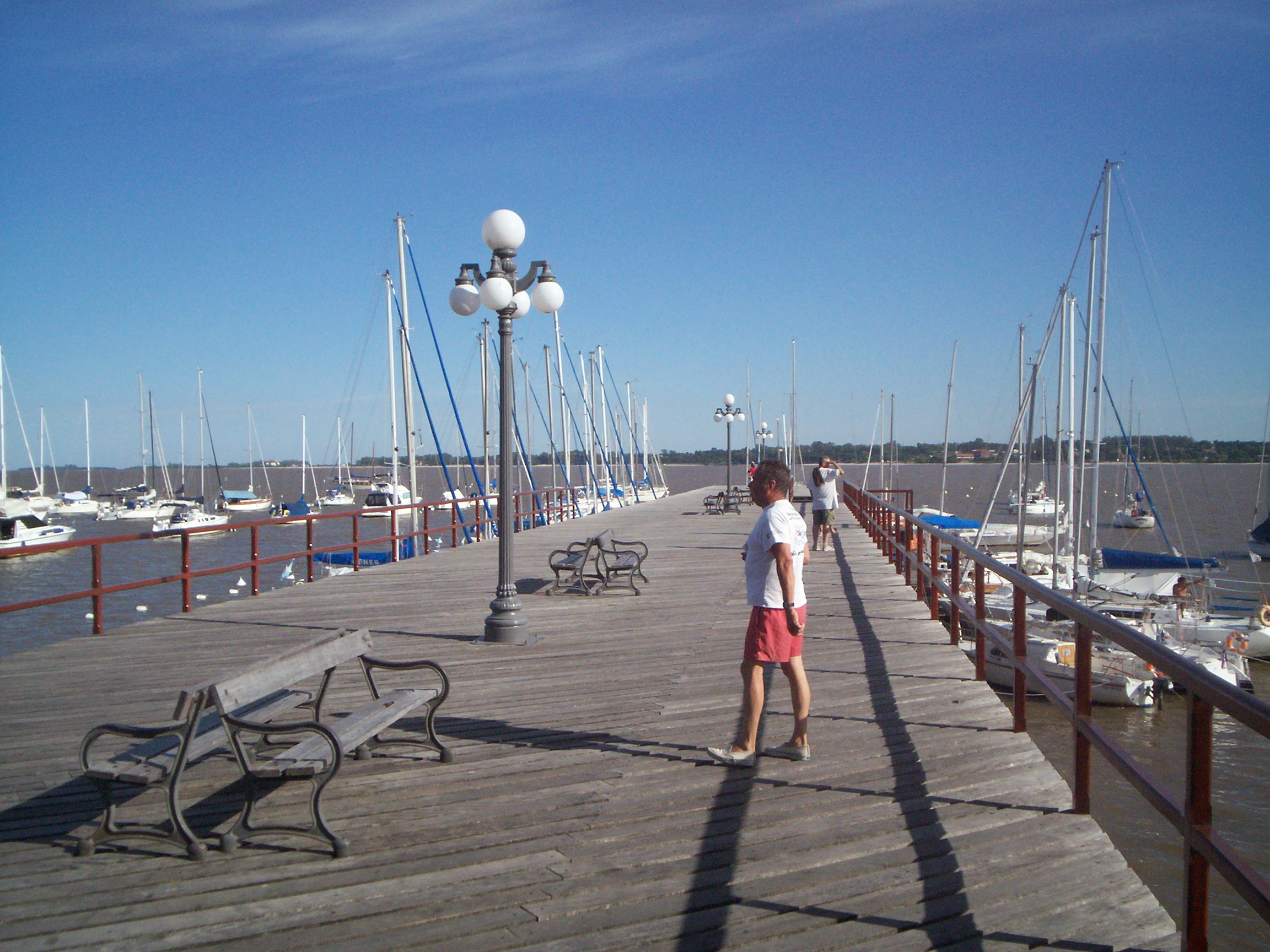
Muelle Viejo in Colonia del Sacramento was the Pit Stop for the fourth leg.

Airdate: October 16, 2011

- Retiro (Avenida Antártida Argentina (in Spanish)) to Colonia del Sacramento, Uruguay (Ferry Terminal)
- Colonia del Sacramento (Portón de Campo)
- Colonia del Sacramento (Intendencia Municipal)
- Colonia del Sacramento (Mariña Sport)
- Colonia del Sacramento (Hacienda de Los Olivos)
- Colonia del Sacramento (Casa de Los Limoneros)
- Colonia del Sacramento (Plaza de Toros)
- Colonia del Sacramento (Muelle Viejo)

This leg's Detour was a choice between Aguja (Needle) or Tronco (Trunk). In Aguja, teams had to search for a wooden needle inside of a bale of hay to receive their next clue. In Tronco, teams had to transport logs from one area to the other then stack them until they reached an indicated height to receive their next clue.

In this leg's Roadblock, one team member had to collect four baskets of lemons then squeeze the lemons to fill four half-liter bottles with lemon juice to receive their next clue.

Additional tasks

- At Portón del Campo, teams had to take two pieces of cheese and deliver determined quantities to seven different places where they would receive a stamp. Once completed, teams had to eat the cheese that was cut but not delivered to receive their next clue.
- At Intendencia Municipal, teams had to answer five multiple choice questions related to classical vehicles that were parked there to receive their next clue.

=== Leg 5 (Uruguay) ===
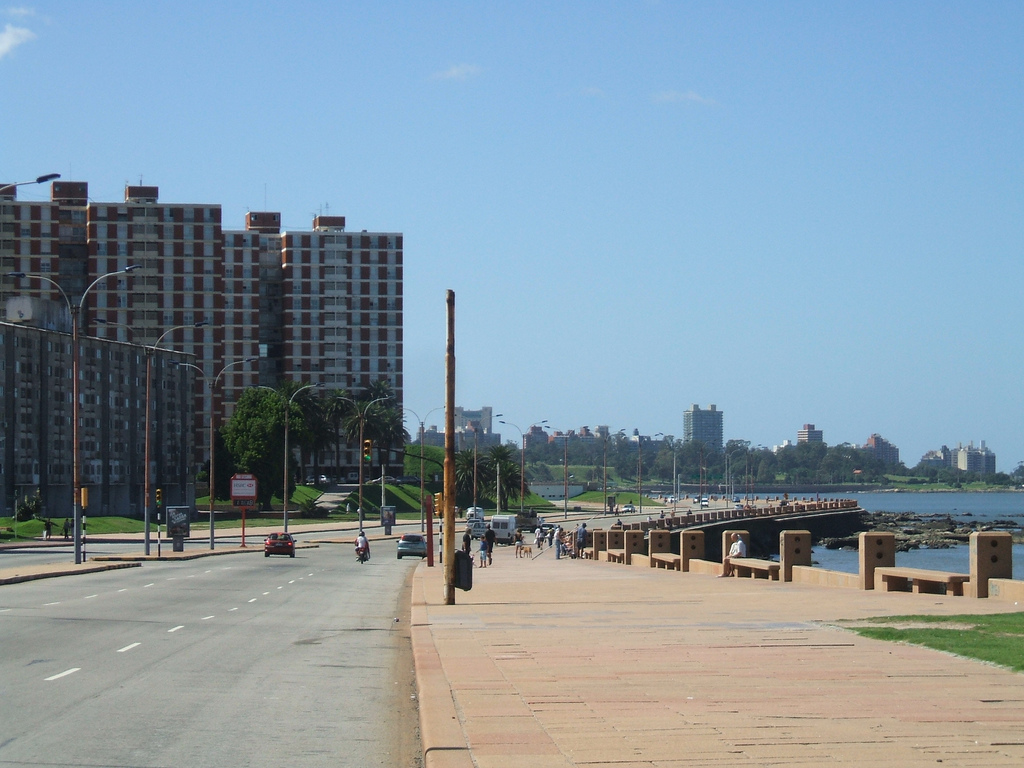
Teams performed both sides of the Detour on the Rambla of Montevideo.

Airdate: October 23, 2011

- Colonia del Sacramento (Colonia Bus Terminal) to Montevideo (Tres Cruces Bus Terminal)
- Montevideo (Velódromo Municipal (in Spanish))
- Montevideo (Bar San Rafael)
- Montevideo (Intersection of 18 de Julio Avenue and Yi Street)
- Montevideo (Universidad del Trabajo del Uruguay (in Spanish))
- Montevideo (Rambla of Montevideo – Kilometer 4.5)
- Montevideo (Telecommunications Tower)
- Montevideo (Palacio Municipal)

In this leg's Roadblock, one team member had to use a provided key had to search among several padlocks locked around the Fuente de los Candados fountain for the one that their key would open to receive their next clue.

This leg's Detour was a choice between Zancos (Stilts) or Patines (Skates). In Zancos, teams put on stilts and had to walk 200 meters and retrieve two balloons which they had to exchange for their next clue. In Patines, team members' legs were tied to each other and in this state they had to skate 200 meters and retrieve two balloons to exchange for their next clue. In either Detour, if a balloon popped, teams would have to go back and get a new one.

Additional tasks

- At the beginning of the leg, teams had to prepare maté and keep it for whole leg until they got to the Pit Stop.
- At the Velódromo Municipal, each team member had to ride a kid's bike for one lap around the Velódromo to receive their next clue.
- At the Universidad del Trabajo, teams had to wear traditional costumes and join a traveling carnival for one block through Montevideo to receive their next clue.
- At the Telecommunications Tower, teams had to get to floor 26 and search in maps for a yellow spot, which was the Pit Stop: the Palacio Municipal.

=== Leg 6 (Uruguay → Chile) ===
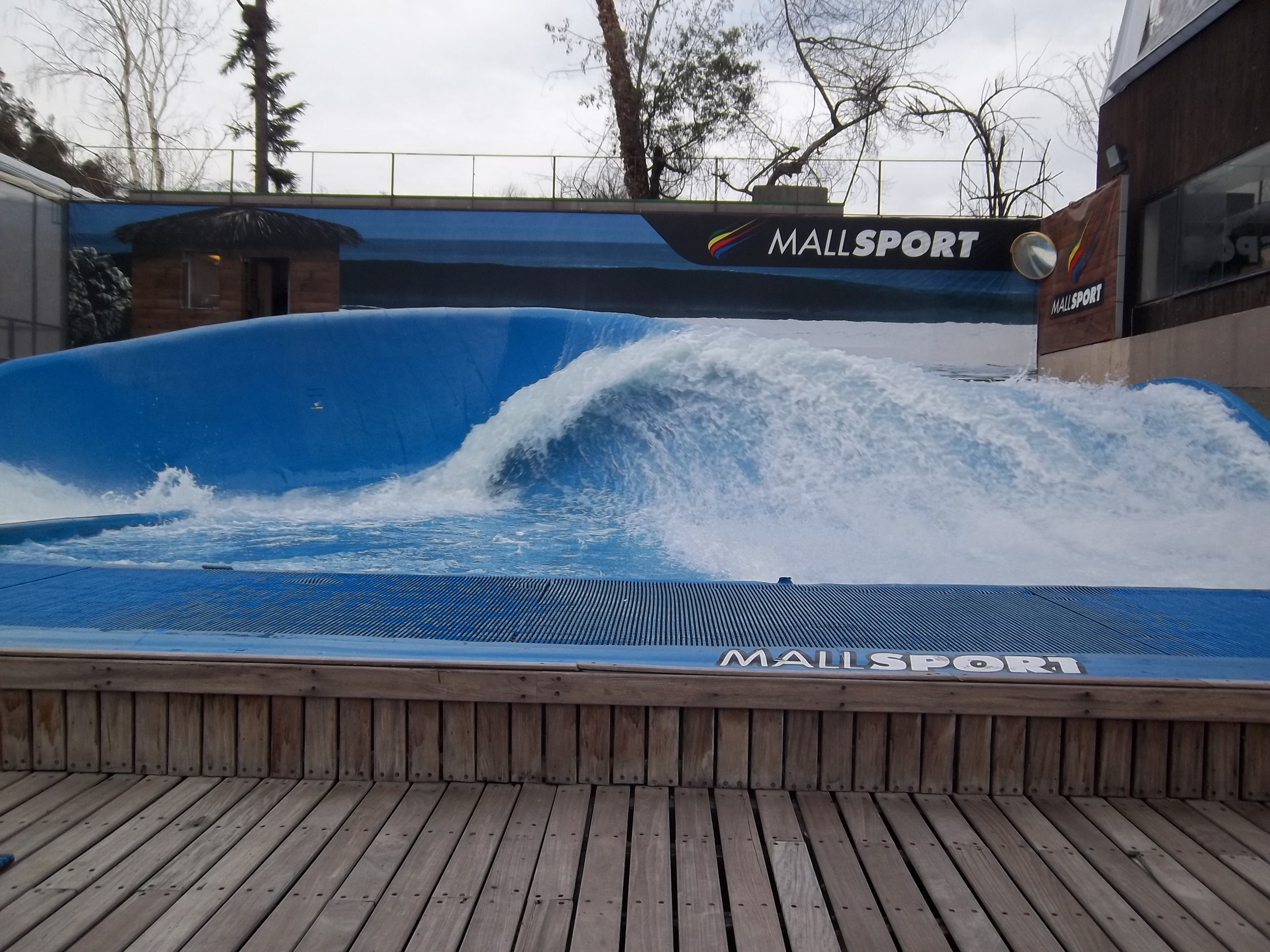
The artificial wave in Mall Sport was this leg's Roadblock location.

Airdate: October 30, 2011

- Montevideo (Carrasco International Airport) to Santiago, Chile (Arturo Merino Benítez International Airport)
- Santiago (Mercado Central)
- Santiago (Mall Sport)
- Santiago (Cerro Santa Lucía – Neptune and Amphitrite Fountain)
- Santiago (Centro Cultural Gabriela Mistral)

For their Speed Bump, Pablo & Rosario had to open 100 clams before they could continue racing.

This leg's Detour was a choice between Techo (Roof) or Pared (Wall). In Techo, both team members had to go over an Air Trail course to receive their next clue. In Pared, both team members had to scale a vertical wall and retrieve an Amazing Race flag to receive their next clue.

In this leg's Roadblock, one team member had to dominate the artificial wave for one minute without falling to receive their next clue.

Additional task

- At the Mercado Central, teams had to transport five bags of ice, each one weighing 50 kilograms (110 lb), to a stall and then set up the stall with the fish arranged following a given pattern to receive their next clue.

=== Leg 7 (Chile) ===
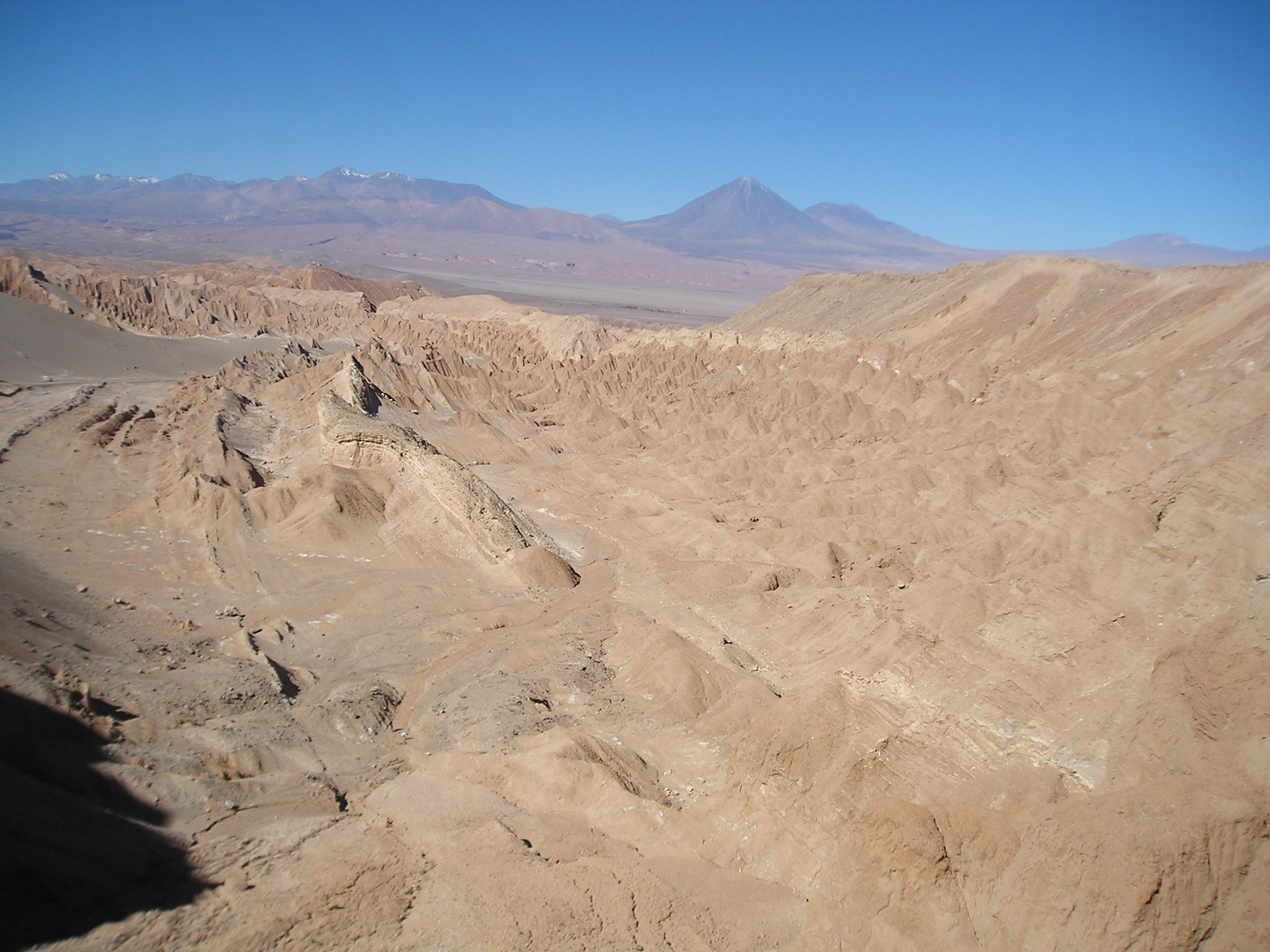
This leg's Detour, Double U-Turn and Roadblock took place at Valle de la Muerte in San Pedro de Atacama.

Airdate: November 6, 2011

- Santiago (Arturo Merino Benítez International Airport) to Calama (El Loa Airport)
- San Pedro de Atacama (Pedro de Valdivia's House)
- San Pedro de Atacama (Tierra Todo Natural Restaurant)
- San Pedro de Atacama (Hotel Don Raúl) (Overnight Rest)
- San Pedro de Atacama (Valle de la Muerte)
- San Pedro de Atacama (Puritama Hot Springs (in Spanish))
- San Pedro de Atacama (Atacama Large Millimeter Array)

This leg's Detour was a choice between Arqueología (Archeology) or Bicicletas (Bikes). In Arqueología, teams had to dig in the marked areas for 10 pieces of an old broken vase. They then had to put all of the pieces together to receive their next clue. In Bicicletas, teams had to ride a bike for 3 kilometres (1.9 mi) in the Atacama Desert. Once they reached an Amazing Race flag, teams had to take the flag back to where they started to receive their next clue.

In this leg's Roadblock, one team member had to push a giant ball filled with water to the top of a sand dune to receive their next clue.

Additional tasks

- At the Tierra Todo Natural Restaurant, teams had to eat Chilean empanadas until they found one empanada which contained a marker directing them to their next destination: the Hotel Don Raúl.
- At the Puritama Hot Springs, teams had to search in the water of the hot springs for a marker directing them to their next Pit Stop: Atacama Large Millimeter Array.

=== Leg 8 (Chile) ===
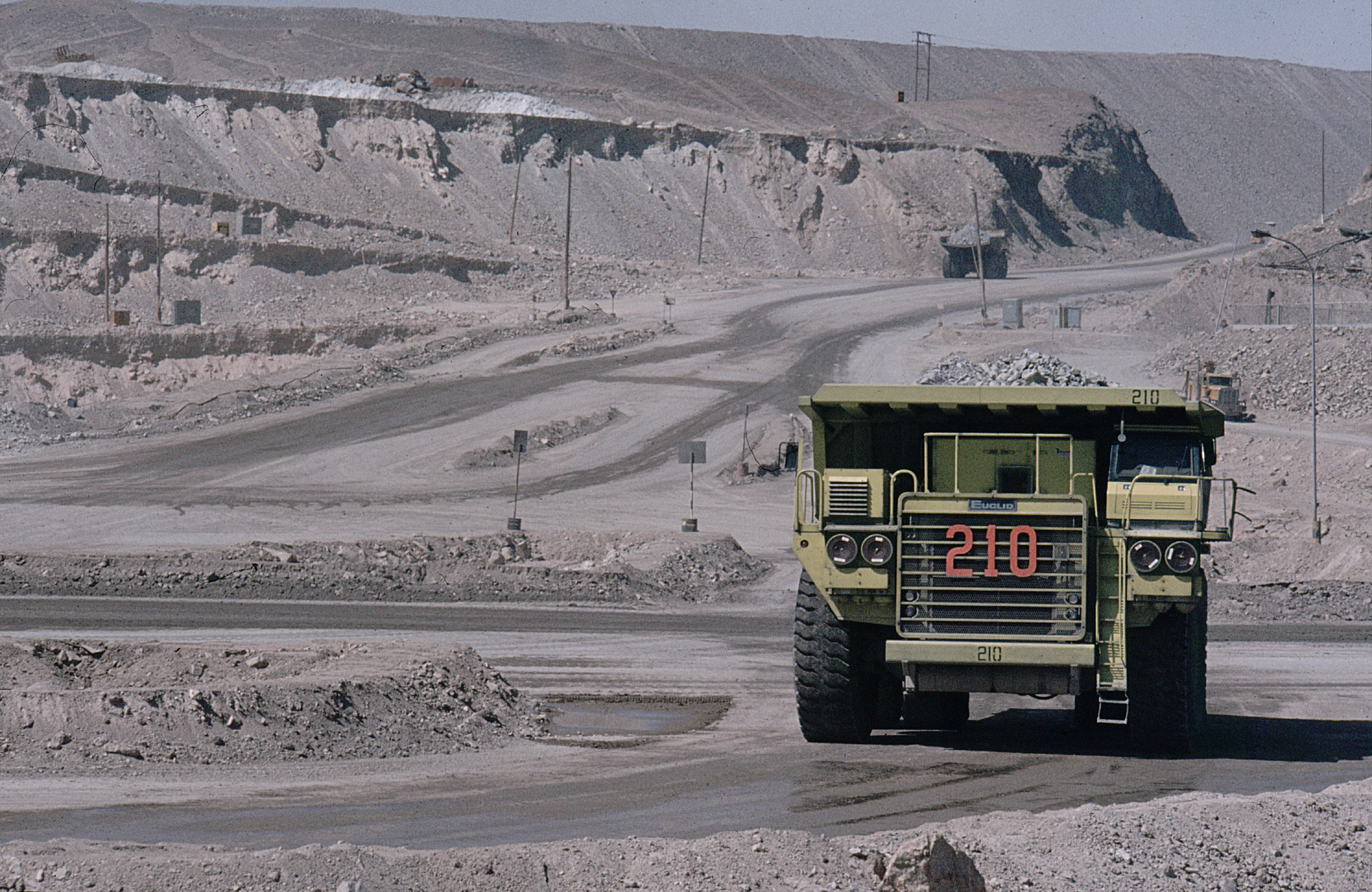
In Antofagasta, teams had to calculate the weight the wheels of a mining truck.

Airdate: November 13, 2011

- Calama (Ferrilo Roundabout)
- Sierra Gorda (Baquedano Railway Station (in Spanish))
- Antofagasta (Finning Centre)
- Antofagasta (Hotel Antofagasta) (Overnight Rest)
- Antofagasta (Balneario Municipal)
- Antofagasta (Hotel Enjoy Antofagasta)
- Antofagasta (Huanchaca Ruins (in Spanish))

In this leg's Roadblock, one team member had to swim onto a platform and retrieve seven inflatables that were shaped like spaghetti. Then, they had to swim back to the shore and exchange them for their next clue.

Additional tasks

- At the Baquedano Railway Station, teams Intersected and together had to construct 9 metres of rail, using the given tools, to receive their next clue.
- At the Finning Centre, teams had to calculate the weight of the wheels of a mining truck using a measuring tape and a series of mathematical calculations to receive their next clue.
- At the Hotel Enjoy Antofagasta, teams were given 15 chips, using those chips teams had to play in a roulette game. If one of the team's numbers was the winner in that round, teams would receive their next clue. Otherwise teams would have to wait five minutes to play again.

=== Leg 9 (Chile → Ecuador) ===
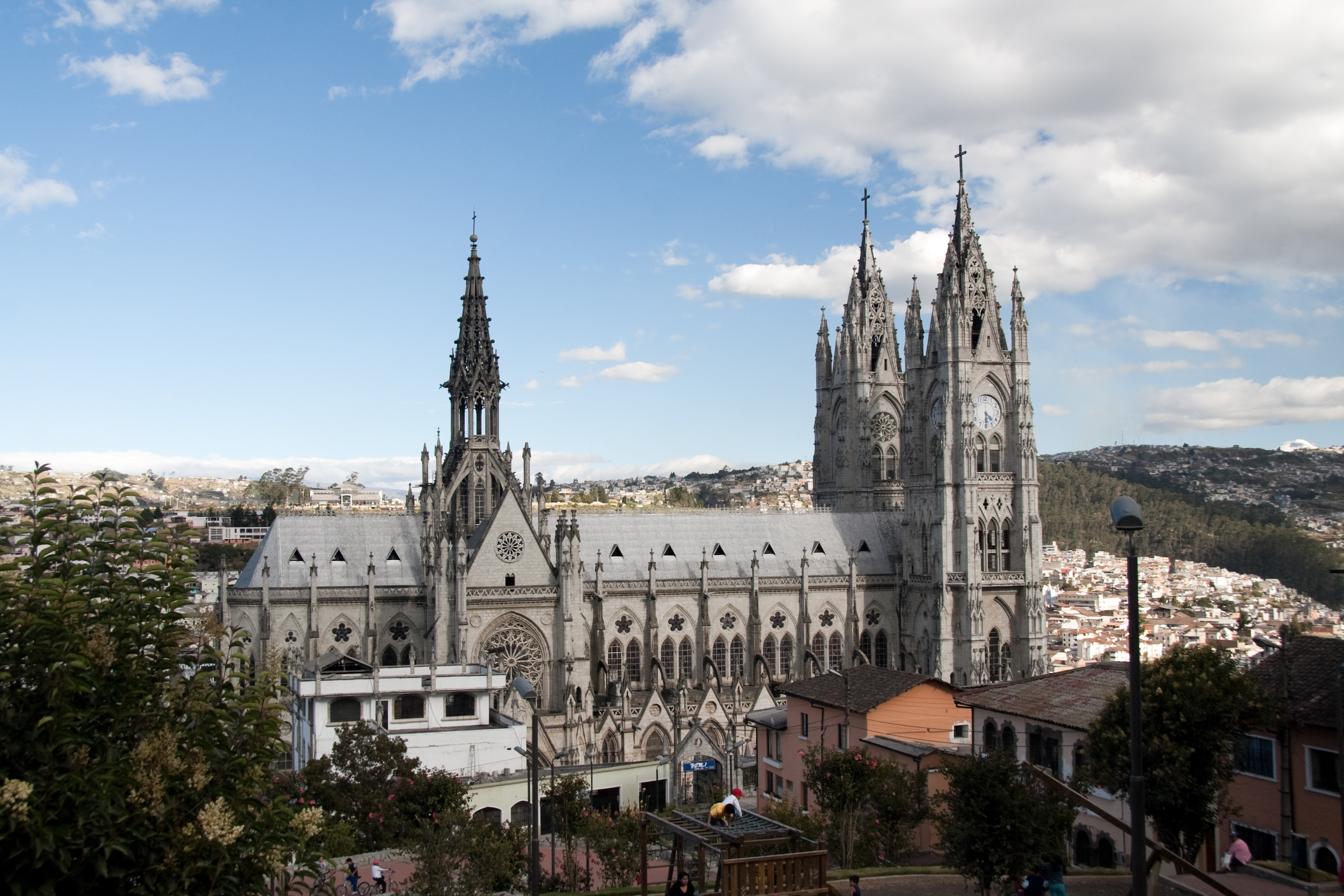
At the Basílica del Voto Nacional, teams had to count the grotesques that resemble the Ecuadorian fauna.

Airdate: November 20, 2011

- Antofagasta (Cerro Moreno International Airport) to Quito, Ecuador (Mariscal Sucre International Airport)
- Quito (Basílica del Voto Nacional)
- Quito (Argentine Republic Square)
  - Quito (Parque La Carolina)
- Quito (González Suárez Bridge)
- Quito (Centro Cultural Metropolitano)
- Quito (Calle La Ronda)
- Quito (TelefériQo)
- Quito (Teatro Nacional Sucre (in Spanish))

In this season's only Fast Forward, teams had to go to La Carolina Park where they had to play a game of the Ecuadorian sport Pelota Nacional. One team member at a time had to hit a ball with a racket and make it past the midfield players. The first team to score 6 points would win the Fast Forward award.

In this leg's Roadblock, teams headed to the González Suárez Bridge. Once there, one team member had to take part in puenting, which is similar to bungee jumping except for the fact that the cord is non-elastic and that the jump ends in a pendulum-like movement, to receive their next clue.

This leg's Detour was a choice between Dulce (Sweet) or Salado (Salty). In Dulce, teams had to eat 15 Ecuadorian sweets each to receive their next clue. In Salado, each team member had to eat 3 plates of librillo, an Ecuadorian dish consisting of raw cow stomach and potatoes, to receive their next clue.

Additional tasks

- At Basílica del Voto Nacional, teams had to count all the grotesques of the Basílica (51), which represent the fauna of Ecuador, to receive their next clue.
- At the TeleferiQo, teams had to attach wheels to a wooden kart and drive downhill without hitting any cones along the way to receive their next clue.

=== Leg 10 (Ecuador) ===
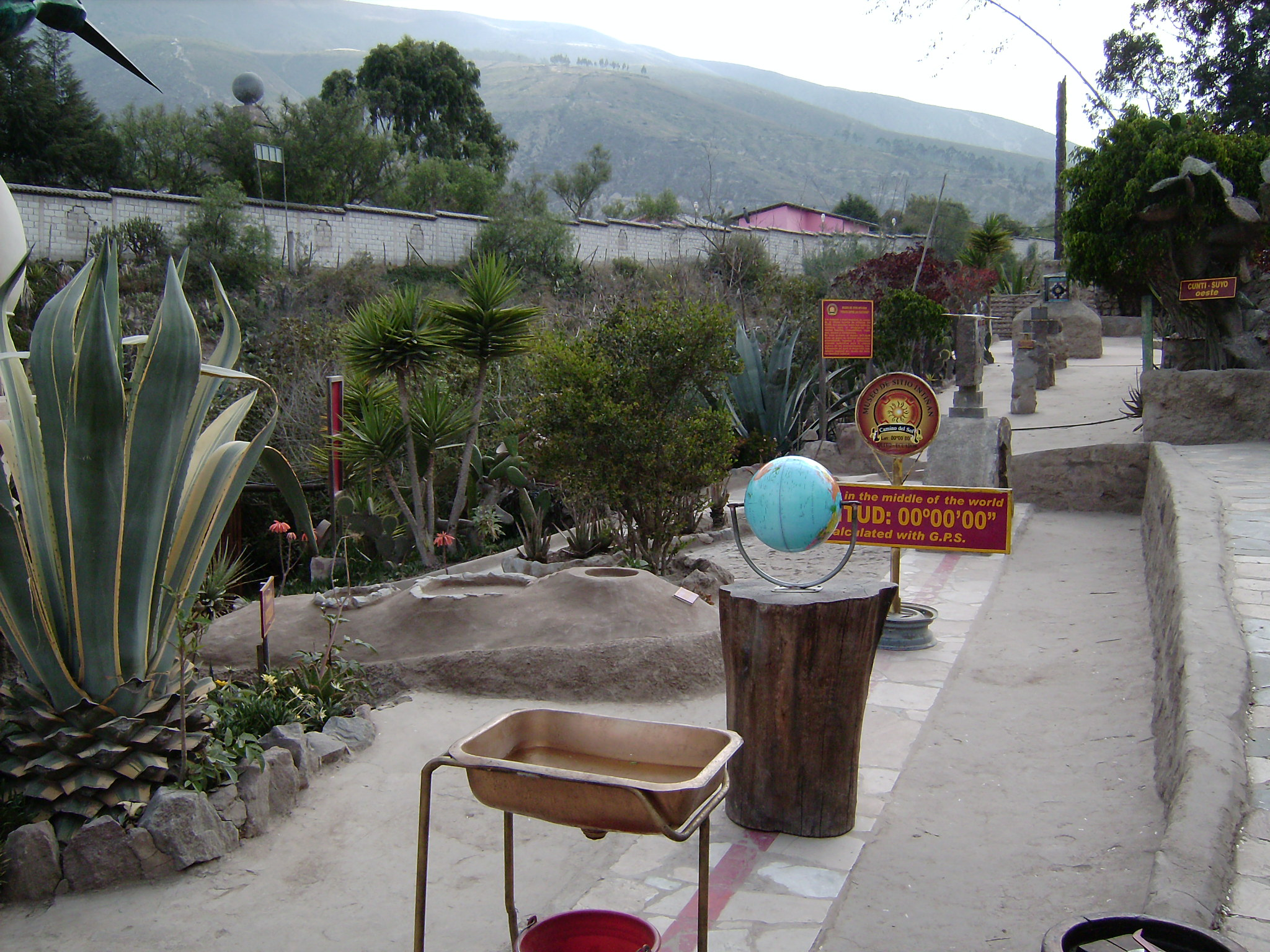
This leg's Speed Bump took place at the Museo Intiñan in Ciudad Mitad del Mundo.

Airdate: November 27, 2011

- Ciudad Mitad del Mundo (Intiñan Museum – Latitude 0°)
- Mindo (El Paraíso del Pescador)
- Mindo (Mindo Main Square)
- Mindo (Balneario Nambillo Alto)
- Mindo ( Las Mariposas Hostel)
- Mindo (Cascada de los Tucanes)
- Mindo (Mindo Lago)

For their Speed Bump, Juan del Mar & Toya had to balance one egg each on the head of a nail right on the Equator before they could continue racing.

This leg's Detour was a choice between Salto del Mono (Monkey Jumping) or Rock Jumping. In Salto del Mono, one team member at a time had to jump from a platform and do a canopy course that had a pendulum-like movement to receive their next clue. In Rock Jumping, both team members had to jump from a very high rock to a river to receive their next clue.

In this leg's Roadblock, one team member had to rappel down the Cascada de los Tucanes waterfall and get their next clue from the middle of it.

Additional task

- At the Paraíso del Pescador, each team member had to transport 25 trout from one tank to the other, using only a net called a chayo to receive their next clue.

=== Leg 11 (Ecuador → Brazil) ===
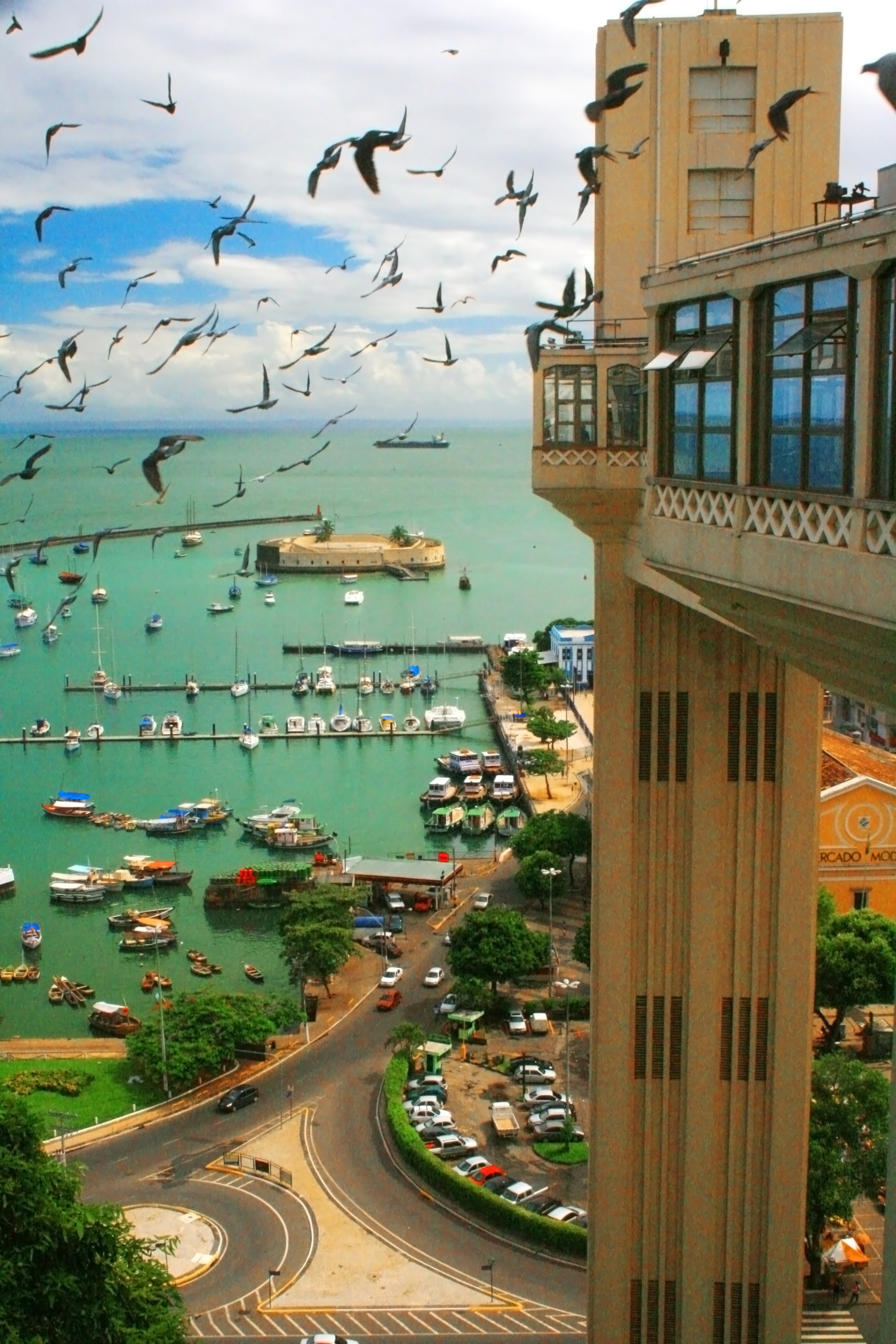
Teams visited Elevador Lacerda while in Salvador, Bahia.

Airdate: December 4, 2011

- Quito (Mariscal Sucre International Airport) to Salvador, Bahia, Brazil (Deputado Luís Eduardo Magalhães International Airport)
- Salvador to Itaparica Island
- Itaparica Island (Hotel Kirymuré)
- Itaparica Island (Itaparica Beach)
- Itaparica Island to Salvador
- Salvador (Elevador Lacerda)
- Salvador (Memorial de las Bahianas)
- Salvador (Praça Tomé de Souza)
- Salvador (Praça Terreiro de Jesus (in Portuguese))
- Salvador (Rampa de La Marina to Forte de São Marcelo)

In this leg's Roadblock, one team member had to search in a mangrove thicket for 5 crabs to receive their next clue.

This leg's Detour was a choice between Coco (Coconut) or Berimbau. In Coco, teams had to open coconuts and pour the water to fill a 20-liter bottle and receive their next clue. In Berimbau, teams had to construct two berimbaus using plastic bottles according to a model to receive their next clue.

Additional tasks

- At the Elevador Lacerda, teams had to take the elevator to the high city and make their way to the Memorial de las Bahianas. Once there, teams had to dress themselves as Bahianos and prepare 15 acarajés. Then, teams had to go on foot to Praça Tomé de Souza and sell them for R$3 each to receive their next clue.
- At Praça Terreiro de Jesus, teams had to wheel a traditional vending cart to Rampa de La Marina where they would receive their next clue.
- To make it to the Pit Stop, teams had to paddle a boat from Rampa de La Marina to Forte de São Marcelo.

=== Leg 12 (Brazil) ===
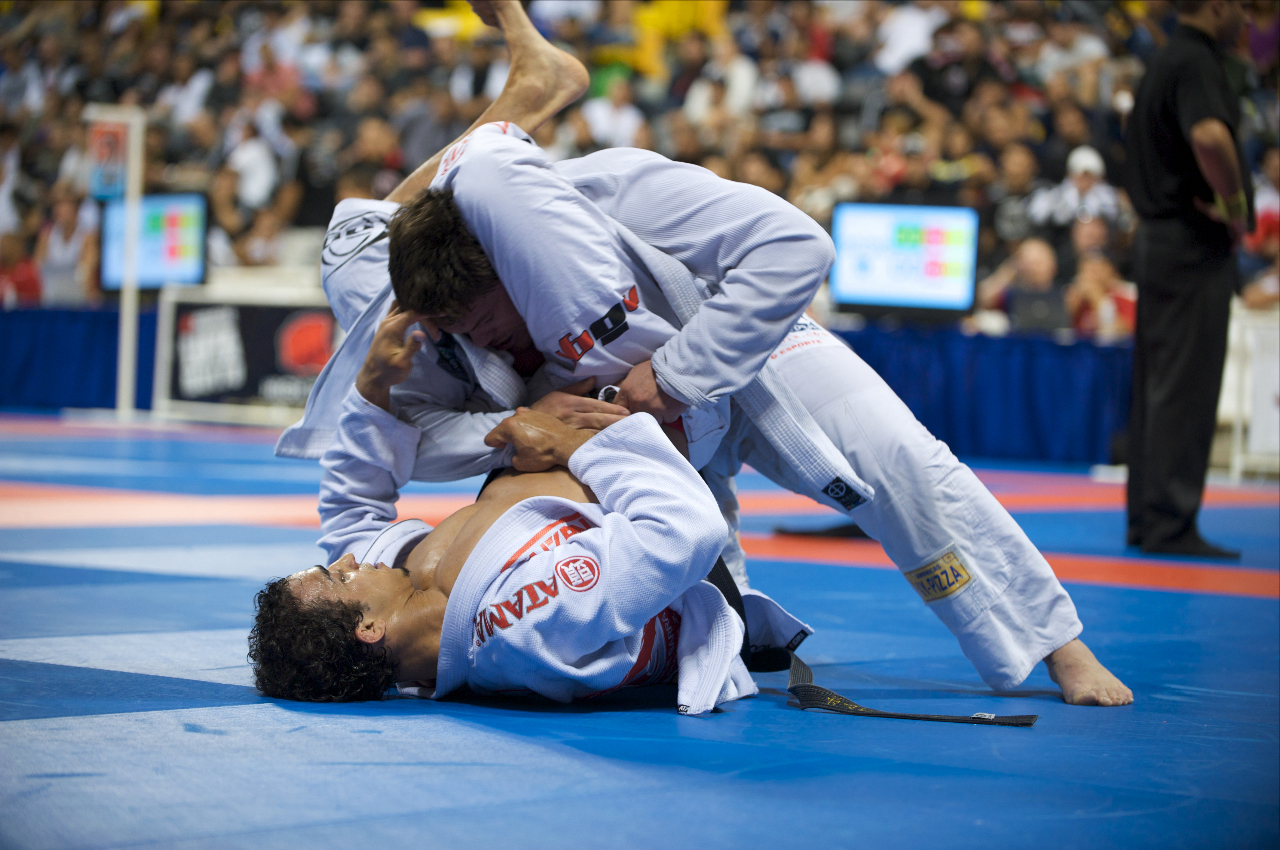
At the Rocian Gracie Jiu-Jitsu Academy, teams had to practice Brazilian Jiu-Jitsu.

Airdate: December 11, 2011

- Salvador (Basílica do Senhor do Bonfim)
- Salvador (Cristo da Barra)
- Salvador (Deputado Luís Eduardo Magalhães International Airport) to São Paulo (São Paulo/Guarulhos International Airport)
- São Paulo (Rocian Gracie Jiu-Jitsu Academy)
- São Paulo (Hotel Slaviero Slim Congonhas) (Overnight Rest)
- São Paulo (Torii da Liberdade)
- São Paulo (Karaokê Chopperia Liberdade)
- São Paulo (Sociedade Brasileira de Cultura Japonesa)
- São Paulo (Aquário de São Paulo (in Portuguese))
- São Paulo (Campo de Marte Airport – Hangar Planavel)

This season's final Detour was a choice between Wasabi or Sashimi. In both options, teams would have to make their way to Karaokê Chopperia Liberdade. In Wasabi, teams had to play pool and deposit a total of 4 balls. Then, each would have to eat a huge piece of wasabi temaki to receive their next clue. In Sashimi, one team member at a time would have to reach ten pieces of sashimi that were hanging from a cords while being anchored to a wall by an elastic band around their head. Once both team members ate the sashimi, they would receive their next clue.

In this leg's first Roadblock, one team member had to dive into the shark tank and retrieve 15 Amazing Race coins which they could exchange for their next clue.

Additional tasks

- At the Basílica do Senhor do Bonfim, teams had to search among thousands of cloth bracelets for the one that said "The Amazing Race", and exchange it for their next clue.
- At Cristo da Barra, both team members had to balance on a slackline cord for 30 seconds to receive their next clue.
- At the Rocian Gracie Jiu-Jitsu Academy, teams had to go through an exhaustive 20-minute Brazilian Jiu-Jitsu training to receive their next clue.
- At the Sociedade Brasileira de Cultura Japonesa, teams had to decipher their next clue, which was written in Japanese, directing them to the Aquário de São Paulo.

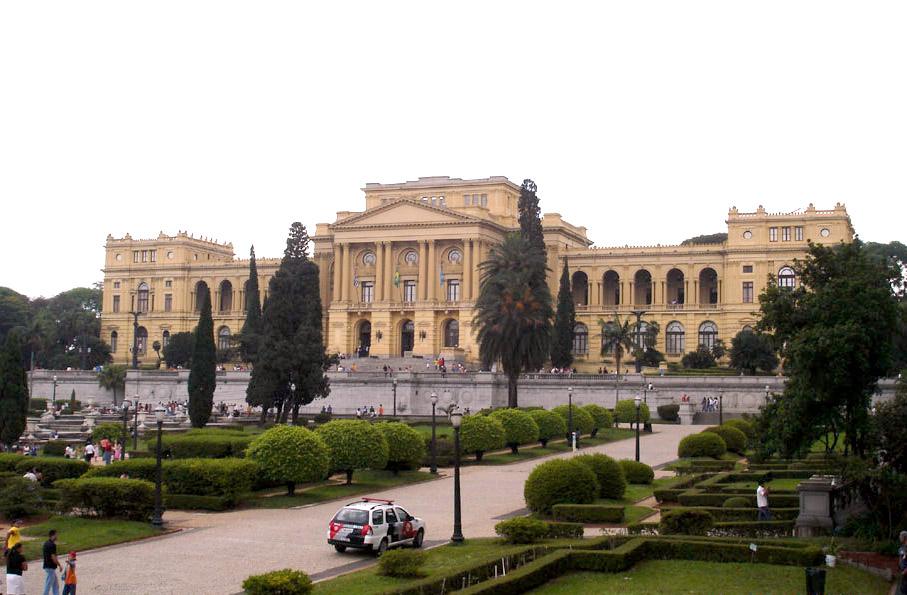
Ipiranga Museum was the Finish Line for the third season of The Amazing Race.

Airdate: December 18, 2011

- São Paulo (Campo de Marte Airport to Kartódromo Internacional Granja Viana (in Portuguese))
- São Paulo (Hotel Slaviero Slim Congonhas) (Overnight Rest)
- São Paulo (Municipal Market of São Paulo)
- São Paulo (Edifício Copan – Bloco E)
- São Paulo (Condomínio Edifício Saint Honoré)
- São Paulo (Monumento do Ipiranga)
- São Paulo (Ipiranga Museum)

In this season's final Roadblock, one team member had to travel in the elevator to the roof of the Condomínio Edifício Saint Honoré and then rappel down the building to receive their next clue.

Additional tasks

- From Campo de Marte Airport, teams were transported on helicopters to the Kartódromo Internacional Granja Viana.
- At Kartódromo Internacional Granja Viana, both team members had to complete 12 laps of the circuit in less than thirteen minutes to receive their next clue.
- At the Municipal Market of São Paulo, teams were given a list of different Brazilian products and some money. Teams would have to buy the products without showing the list to sellers, once the teams have all the products they have to exchange them for their next clue.
- At Edifício Copan, teams had to climb the outside stairs to the roof of the building to find their next clue.
