= Parque Gabriel García Moreno =

Park in Quito, Ecuador

Coordinates: 0.2154°S 78.5069°W

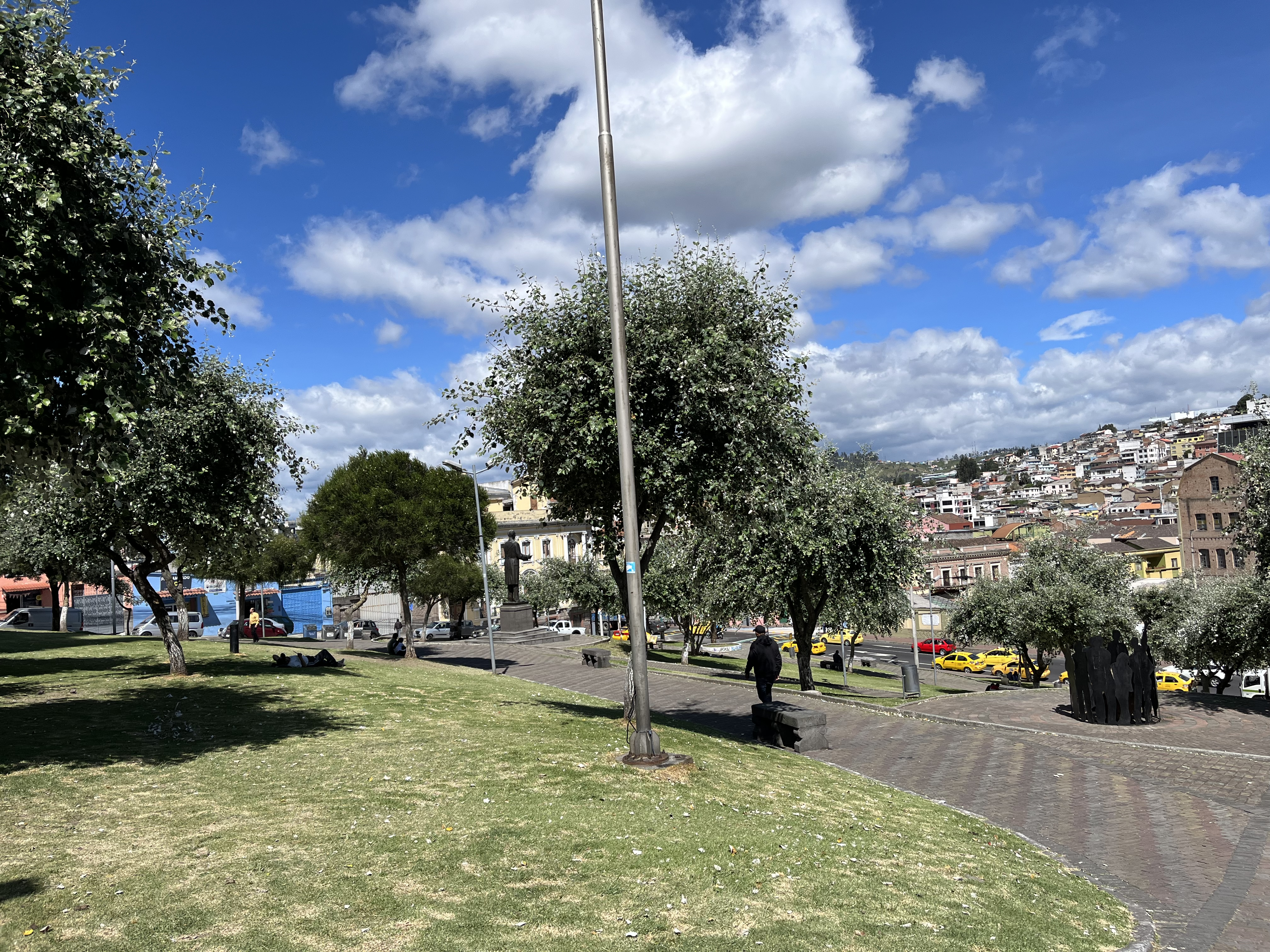
View of the park

Parque Gabriel García Moreno is a park in the Old Centre part of Quito, Ecuador. It is near the Basílica del Voto Nacional. It is located south of Parque Julio Montevelle and west of Parque La Alameda.
