= Parque Julio Montevelle =

Park in Quito, Ecuador

Coordinates: 0.2134°S 78.5102°W

Parque Julio Montevelle is a park in the Old Centre part of Quito, Ecuador. It is located north of Parque de La Basílica and northwest of Parque La Alameda.
