= Glaciarium (museum) =

Glaciarium Museum of Patagonic Ice
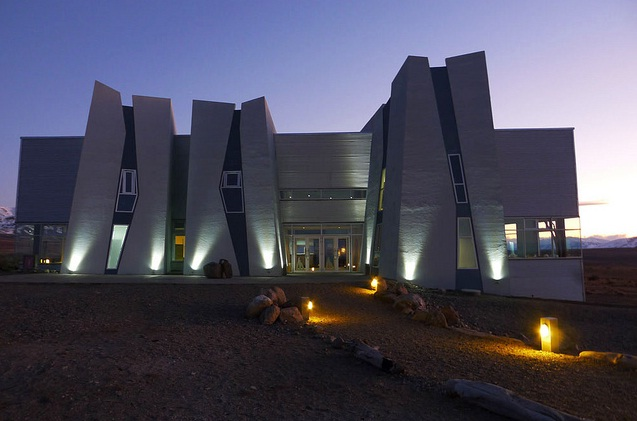
- View from the access to the Museum

- Location of Glaciarium in Santa Cruz
- Established: January 17, 2011
- Location: El Calafate, Santa Cruz, Argentina
- Coordinates: 50°20′28″S 72°20′59″W
- Type: Ice and Glaciers Interpretation Center
- Collection size: Modern multimedia exhibits
- Director: Pedro Skvarca
- Website: Sitio web de Glaciarium

Glaciarium is a modern glacier interpretation centre, built to entertain and educate about ice, glaciers and the Southern Patagonian Ice Field. It is located in the town of El Calafate, gateway to glaciers, in the Santa Cruz province, Patagonia, southern Argentina. It opened on January 17, 2011, with a ceremony that was attended by President Cristina Fernández de Kirchner. The building was designed by the architectural office Santiago Cordeyro Arquitectos and the architect Pablo Güiraldes.

The centre is dedicated to ice and glaciers, and is designed to educate visitors about these natural phenomena in depth. The scientific director is glaciologist Pedro Skvarca. The building is formed by a main hall and three exhibitions halls, a total of 2,500 square metres (27,000 sq ft). Two halls house the permanent glaciological exhibits that include dioramas, multimedia, 3D models, and other modern resources. The third hall is a cultural venue and movie theatre where 3D documentaries and other films are screened.

== Distinctions ==
The Glaciarium has been declared of interest by the Argentine National Parks Bureau, the province of Santa Cruz, and the National Congress of Cultural Interest.

== Permanent Exhibits ==
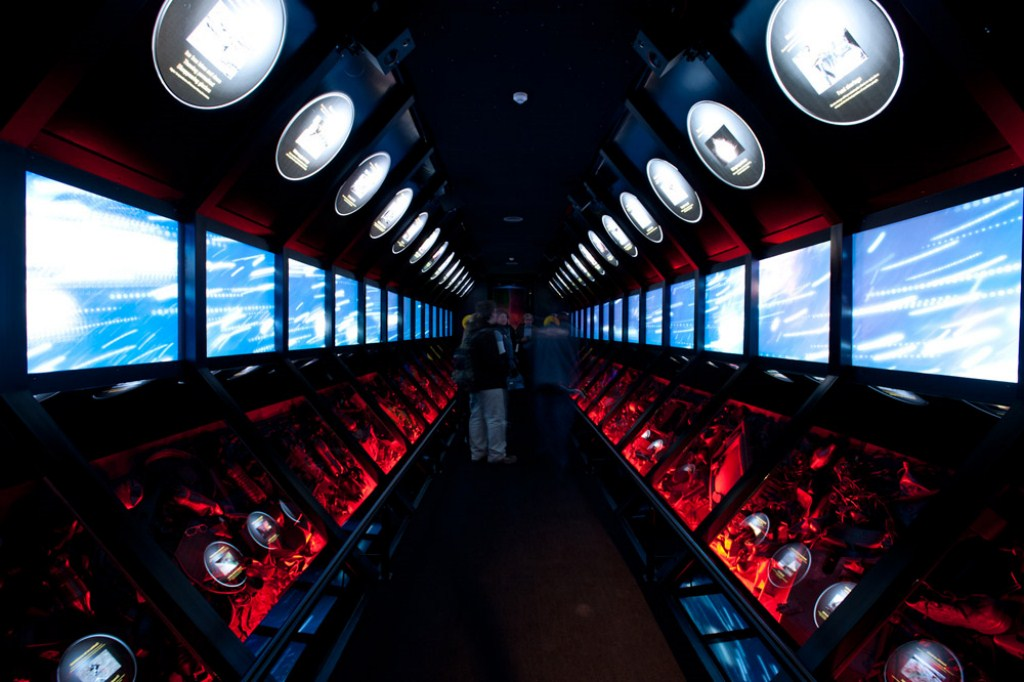
Technologic exhibits inside Glaciarium

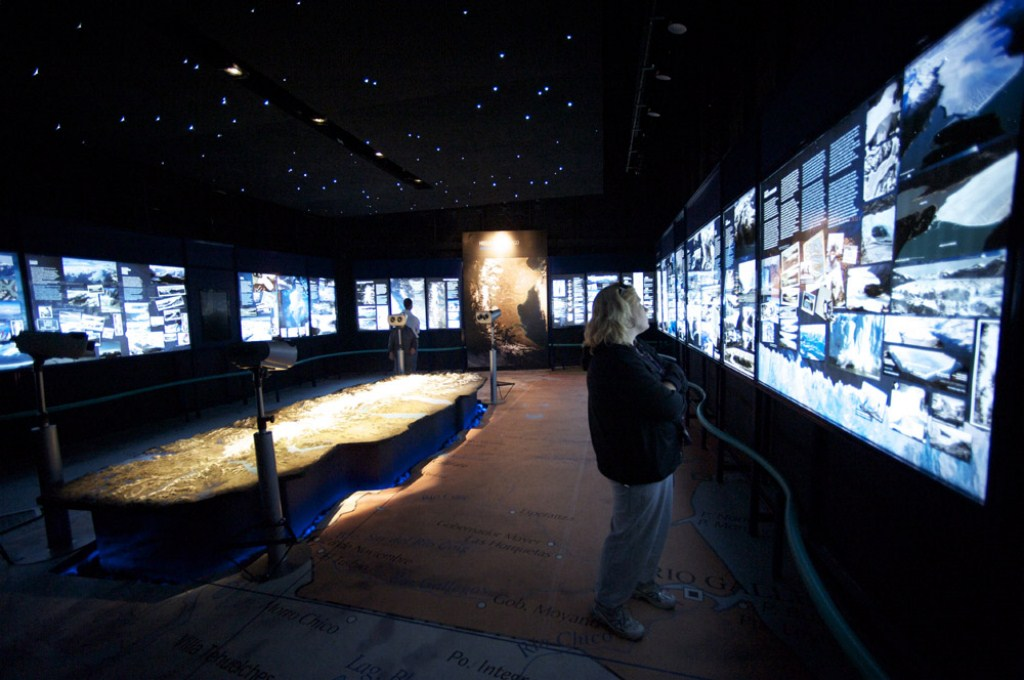
Interior of the exhibit halls

The permanent exhibits cover the formation of glaciers, the early explorers and scientists, how snow turns into ice, how glaciers move, the Earth's past, and the Patagonian glaciers.

== Ice Bar ==
In October 2011, an ice bar opened in the Glaciarium. It was billed as being the only bar in the world constructed completely from glacial ice. Despite being provided with capes, gloves, and boots, patrons are only allowed to stay in the bar for 20 minutes because of the cold.
