= Basílica del Voto Nacional =

Historic church in Quito, Ecuador

Basilica of the National Vow Basílica del Voto Nacional (in Spanish)
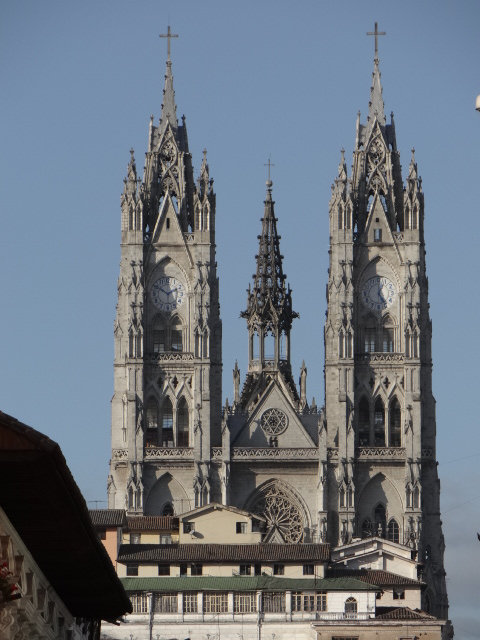

- Location in Ecuador
- 0°12′54″S 78°30′27″W
- Location: Quito
- Country: Ecuador
- Denomination: Roman Catholic
- Website: Basilica at Archdiocese of Quito

History
- Consecrated: 1988; 38 years ago

Architecture
- Heritage designation: National Monument
- Architect: Emilio Tarlier
- Style: Neogothic
- Groundbreaking: 1892

Specifications
- Length: 140 metres (460 ft)
- Width: 35 metres (115 ft)
- Height: 30 metres (98 ft) (sanctuary)

Administration
- Archdiocese: Archdiocese of Quito

The Basilica of the National Vow (Spanish: Basílica del Voto Nacional) is a Roman Catholic church located in the historic center of Quito, Ecuador. It reaches up to 83m in height.

== History ==
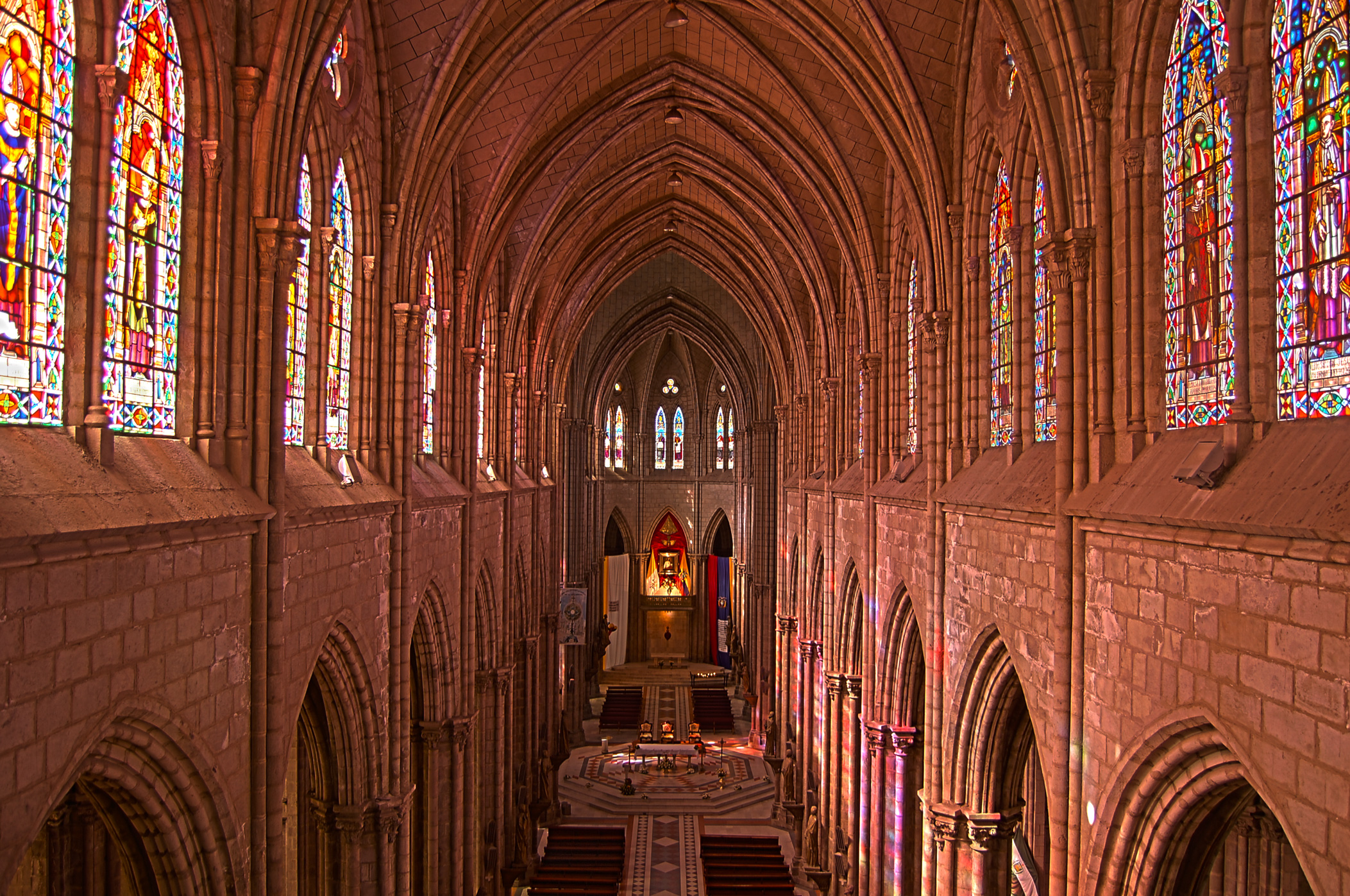
View down the nave to the sanctuary

The basilica arose from the idea, proposed by Father Julio Matovelle in 1883, of building a monument as a perpetual reminder of the consecration of Ecuador to the Sacred Heart. President Luis Cordero issued the decree on July 23, 1883, and it was carried out by president José María Plácido Caamaño on March 5, 1884. The congress, in accordance with the year's budget, designated 12,000 pesos for the construction - 1,000 pesos per month, beginning in 1884. By the decree of July 3, 1885, the fourth Quitense Provincial Council turned the construction of the basilica into a religious commitment in the name of the country. In 1887, the Issodum Fathers began construction for five years, with the approval of Pope Leo XIII. The Oblato fathers donated the land for the basilica. To continue construction, donations were accepted from believers, who provided stones in exchange for engraving their names on them. In 1895, the state established a tax on salt to continue the building and making it more established.

In 1901, Father Matovelle and his Community of Missionary Monks, took charge of the construction at the request of Archbishop Pedro Rafael González Calisto. The building was designed by architect Emilio Tarlier at the cost of 40,000 French francs. Tarlier was inspired by the Bourges Cathedral. On July 10, 1892, the first stone was placed. Between 1892 and 1909, the Heart of Mary Cathedral was constructed. The basilica was blessed by Pope John Paul II on January 30, 1985, and it was consecrated and inaugurated on July 12, 1988.

The basilica remains technically "unfinished." Local legend says that when the Basílica is completed, the end of the world will come.

For a small fee, visitors may climb to the top of the church to a viewing platform which overlooks the city. The Basilica hosts the National Pantheon of Ecuador on its crypt, where several of the former Presidents of Ecuador are buried.

== Gallery ==
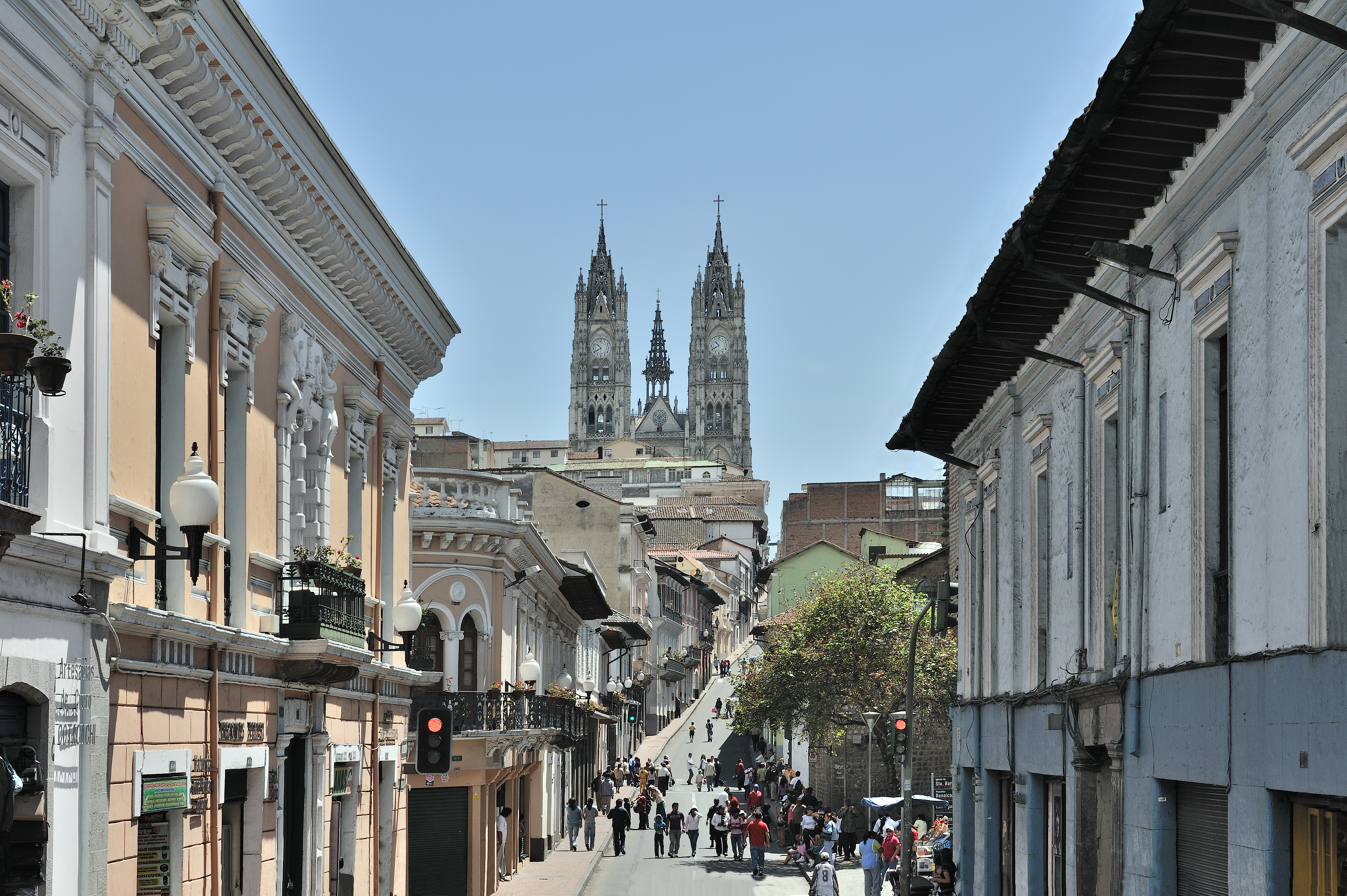
The Basílica as seen from Venezuela street.

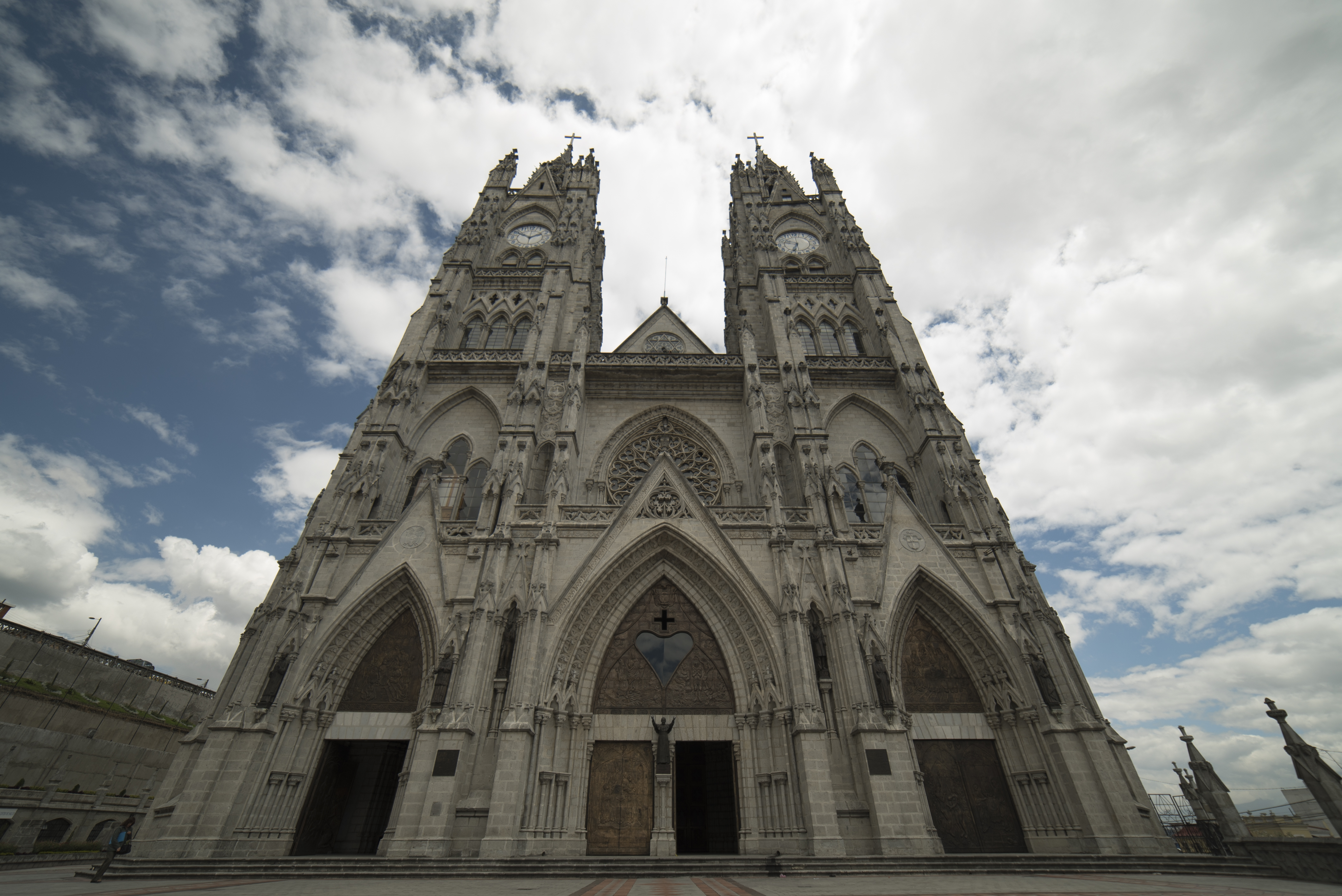
South façade in November 2016.

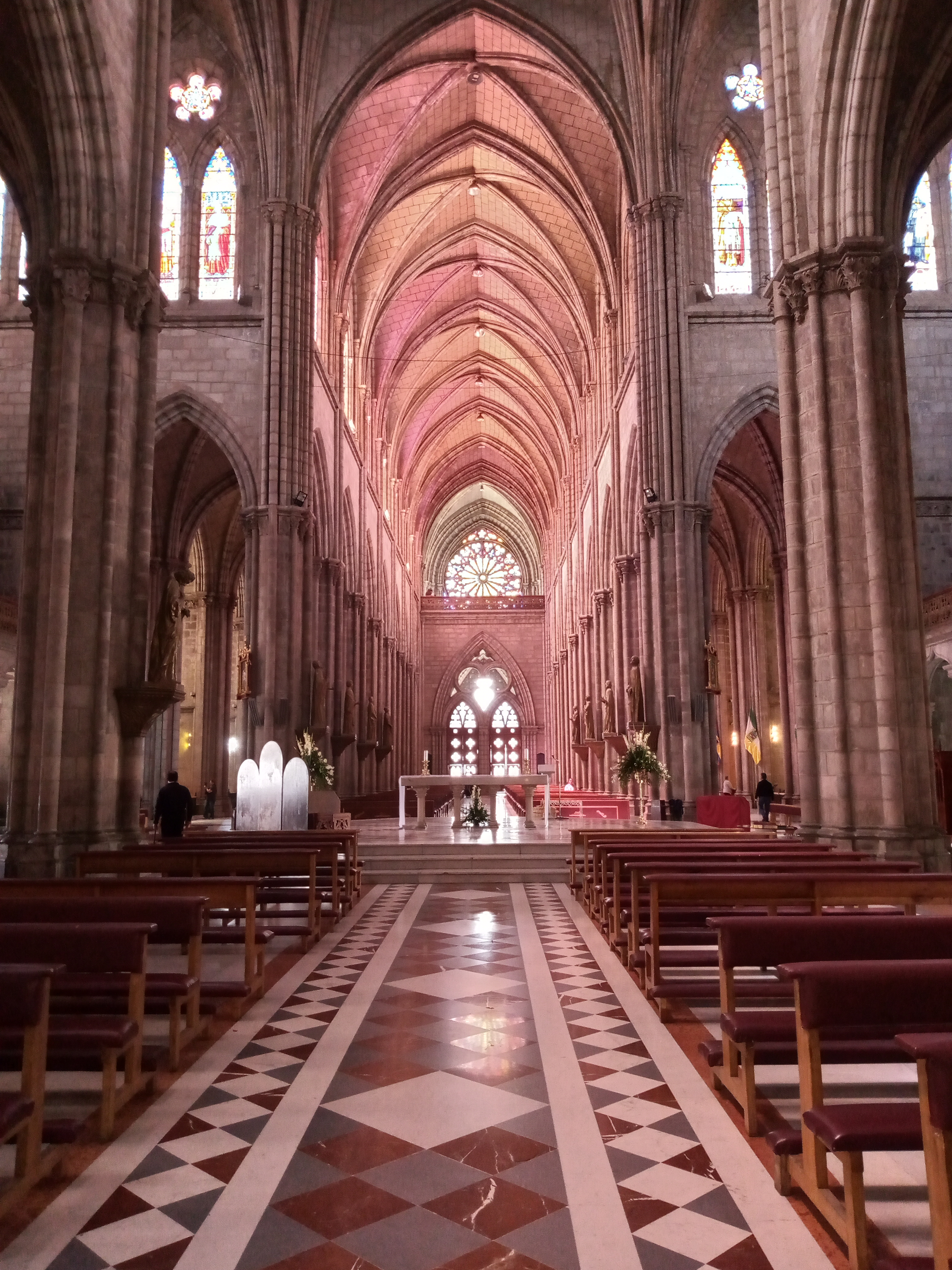
View of the nave.

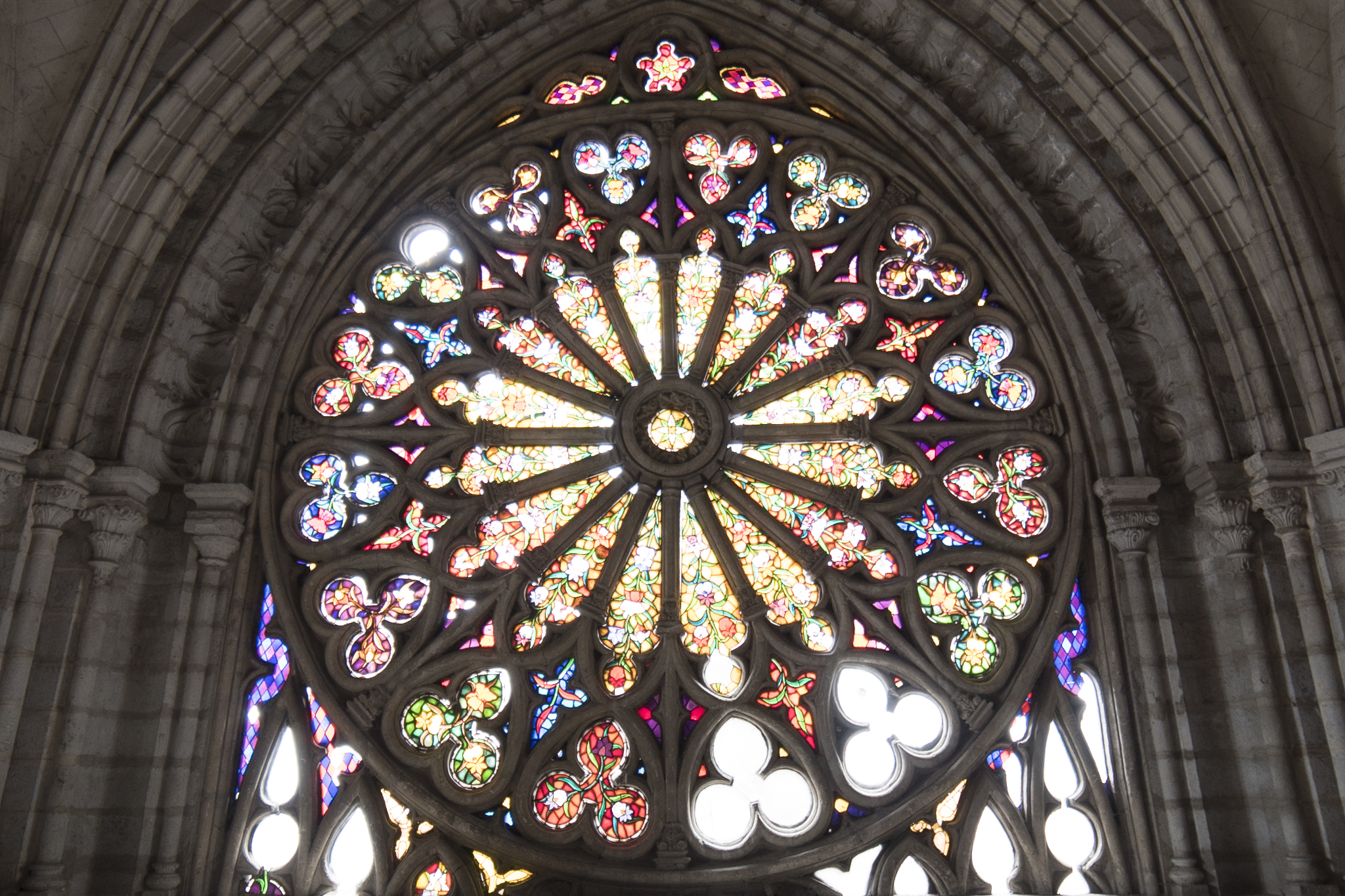
Rose window in the west transept.

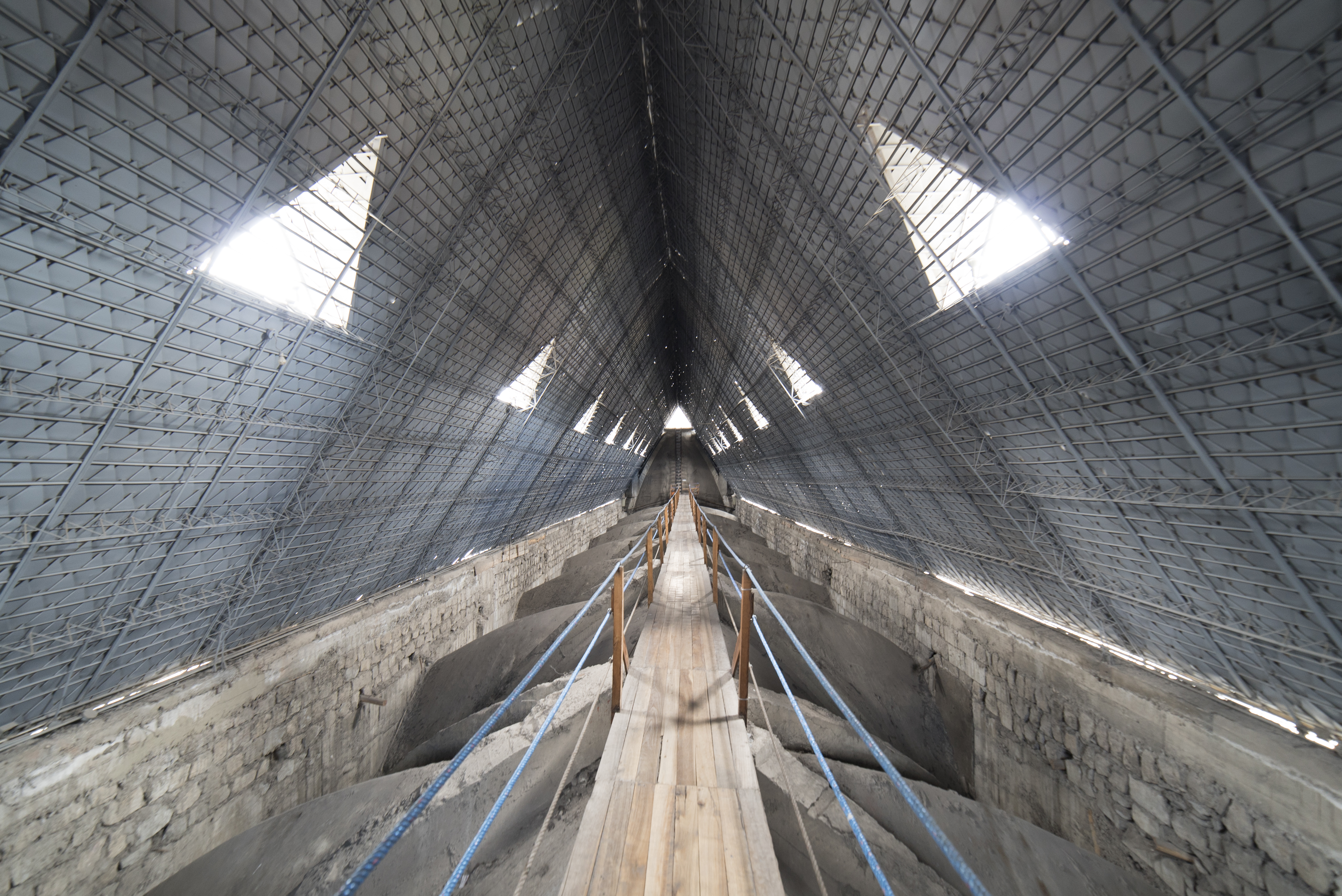
Catwalk leading to the roof.

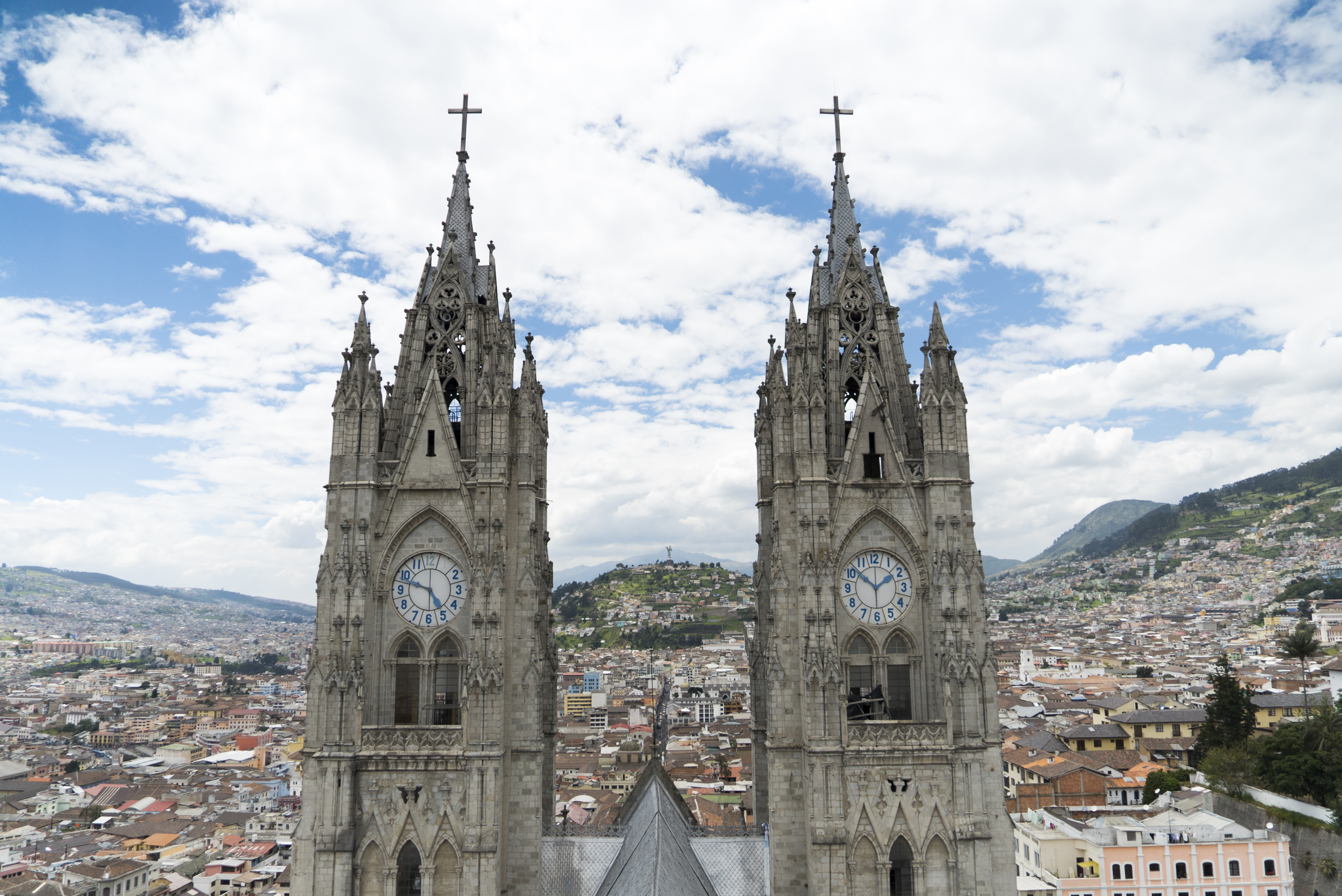
North face of the clock towers, viewed from the roof.

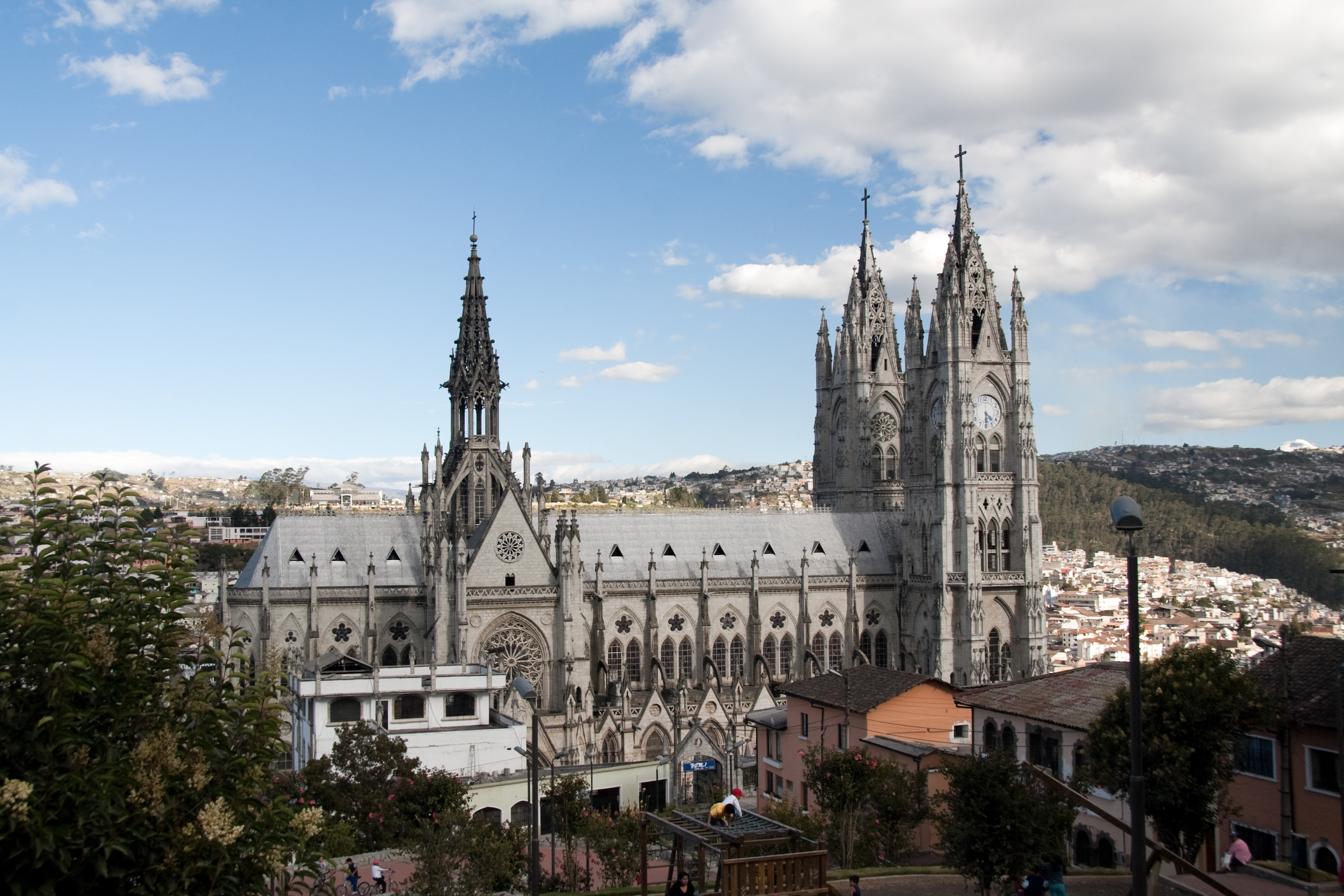
The Basílica looking east.

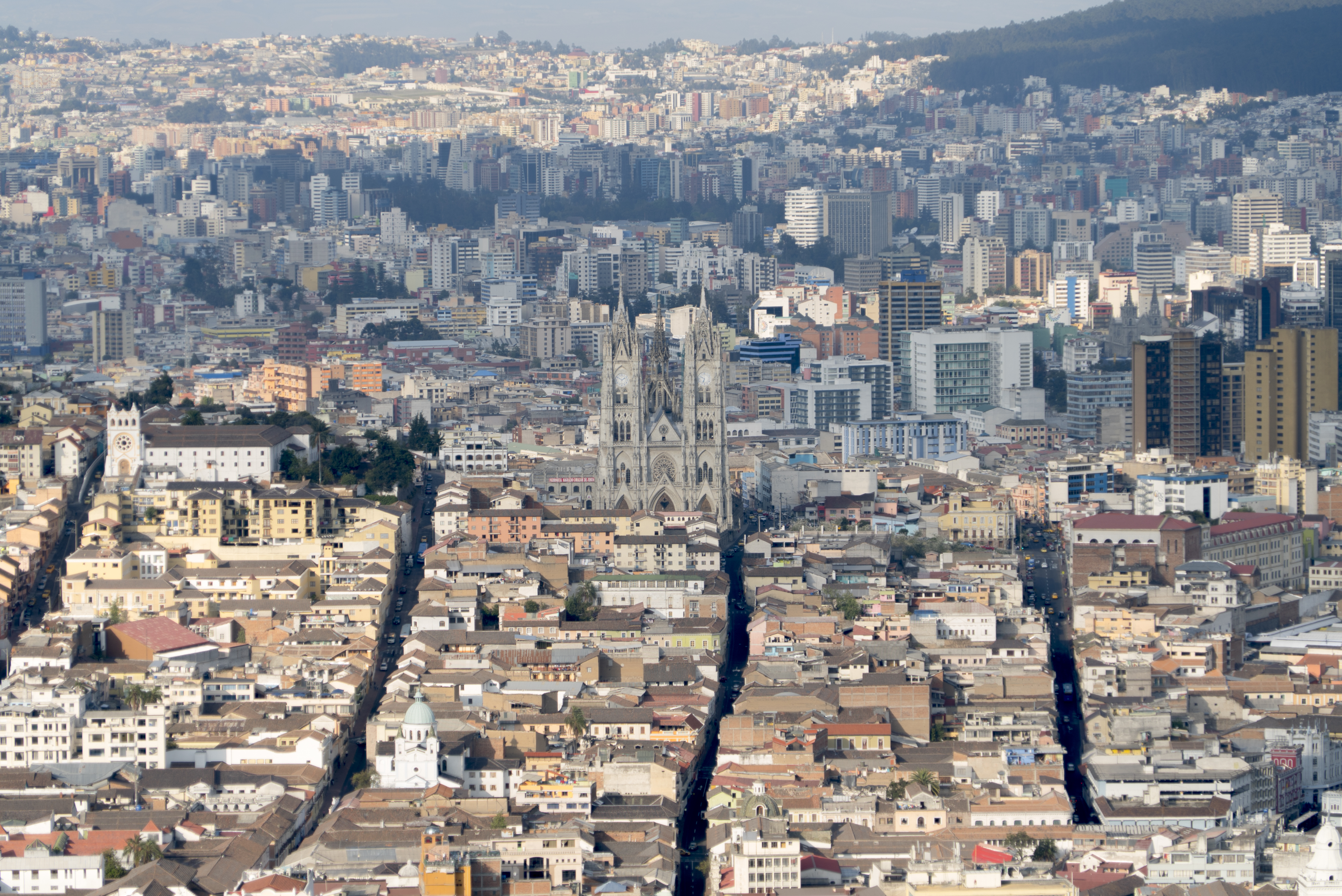
South façade as seen from El Panecillo.

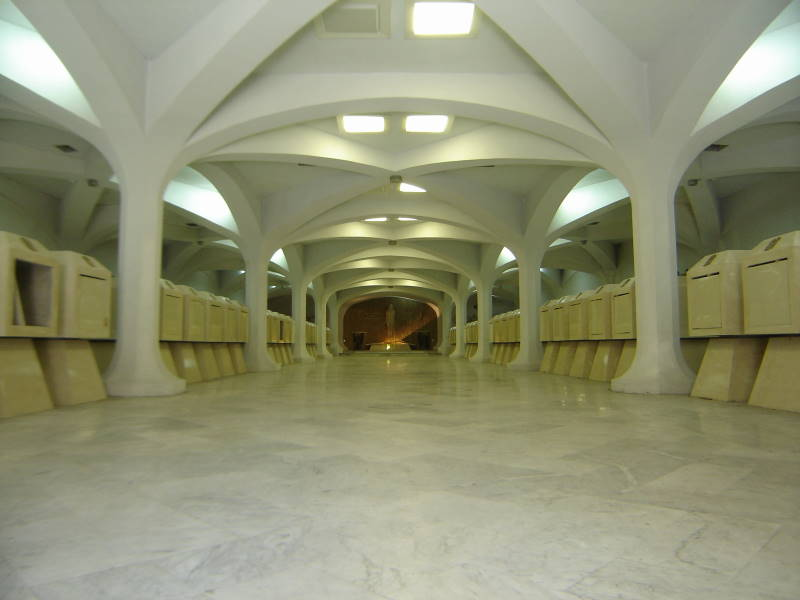
The underground pantheon.

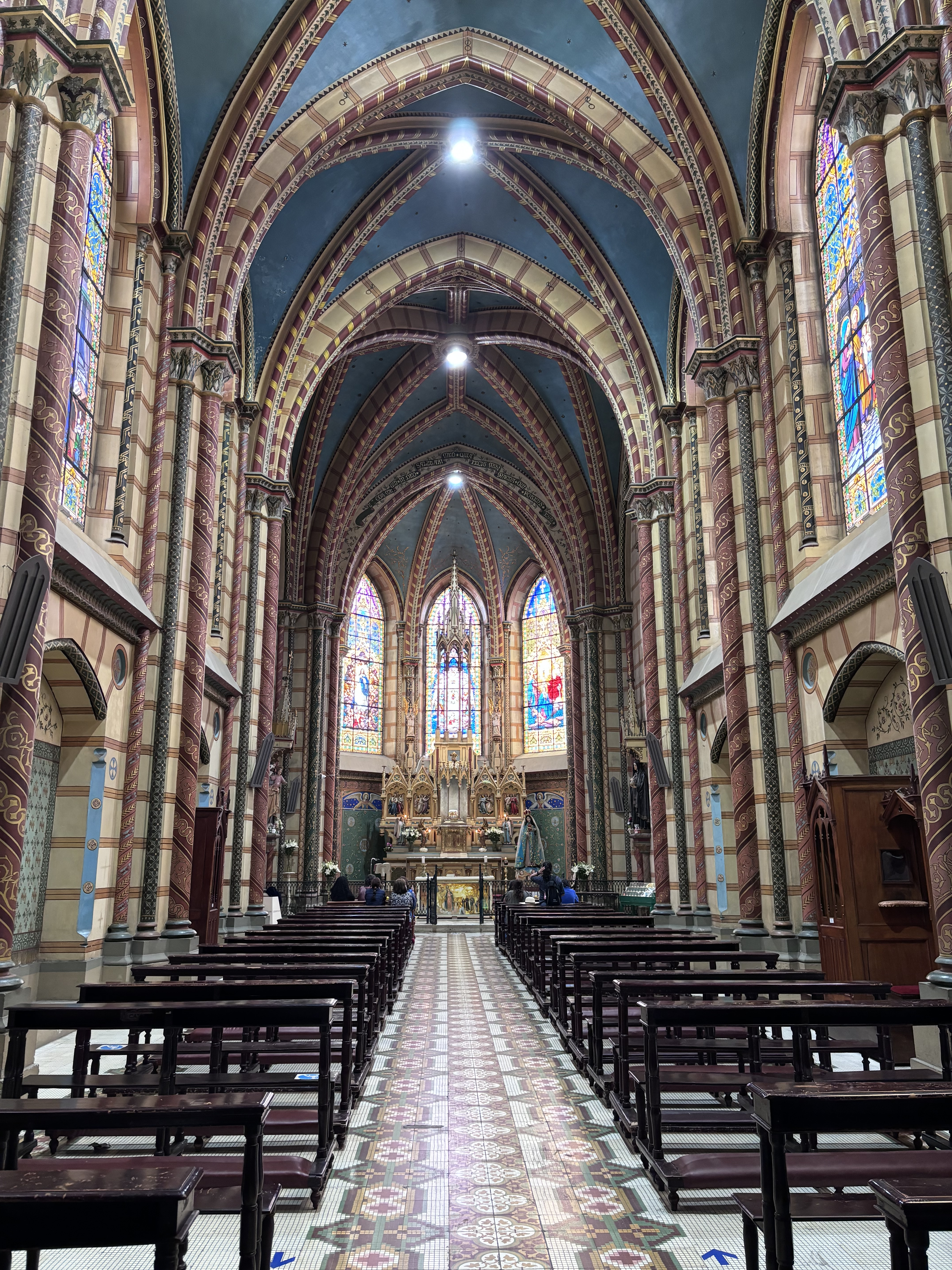
Chapel of the Immaculate Heart of Mary.
