= Wichard of Pohlheim =

Bishop of Passau

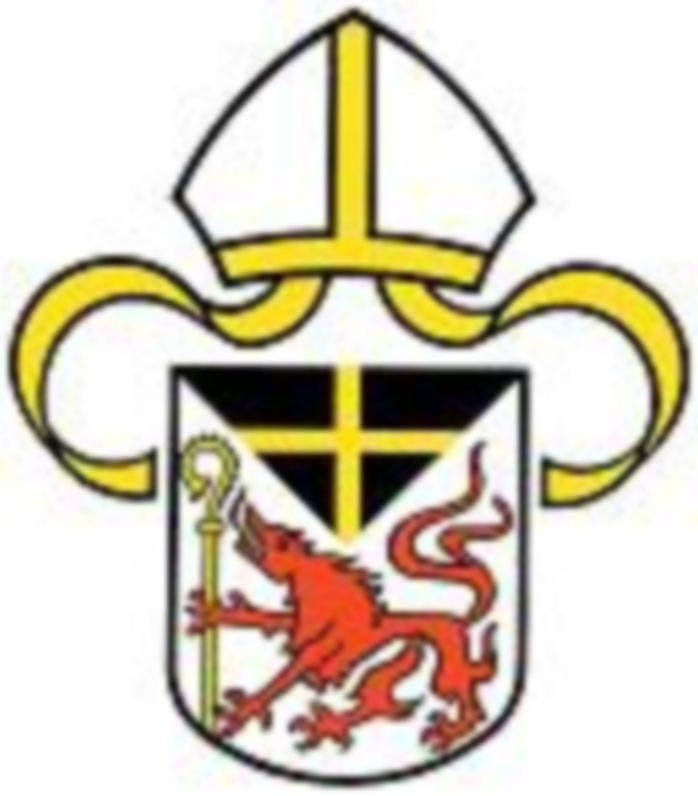
Bistumswappen of Passau.

Wichard von Pohlheim was Bishop of Passau from 1280 to 1282.

== Biography ==
The year of his birth is unknown. As bishop he was a sponsor of the Cistercian monasteries of Fürstenzell and Heiligenkreuz as well as of the Dominican nunnery at Niederaltaich, he also founded the Franciscan monastery of Wels. He took part in the provincial synod in Salzburg in 1281. Various reforms were planned for the World and Order clergy, which were still connected with the efforts of Bishop Otto of Lonsdorf. He died on 17 December 1282 in Vienna.
