= Anthelm =

Anthelm or Antelm may refer to:

- Anthelm (bishop of Passau) (fl. 764)
- Anthelm of Belley (1107–1178), prior of La Grande Chartreuse
- Antelm of Cluny (fl. 1205 – c. 1241), Latin archbishop of Patras
- Anthelm I, bishop of Maurienne from 1262 to 1269
- Anthelm II, bishop of Maurienne from 1334 to 1349

== See also ==
- Anselm (disambiguation)
