= Berthold of Pietengau =

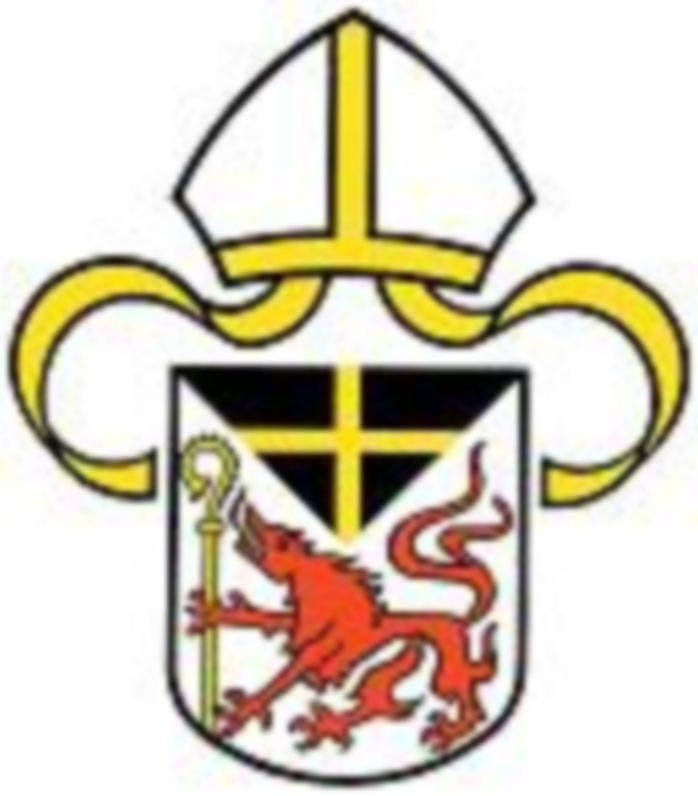
Bistumswappen of Passau.

Berthold of Pietengau, also known as Berthold Count von Pietengau in Sigmaringen ( - 1254) was Prince-Bishop of Passau from 1250 to 1254.

== Family ==
Berthold was the son of Count Gottfried von Sigmaringen-Helfenstein and Adelheid von Neuffen, daughter of Count Berthold I of Weissenhorn-Neuffen-Achalm-Hettingen. Count Gebhard of Sigmaringen-Pietengau was a brother of Berthold.

== Career ==
Berthold, the brother of Bishop Count Albert I of Pietengau, residing in the Bishopric of Regensburg from 1246 to 1259, was there as assistant Bishop and became the diocesan administrator after the deposition of the Passau bishop Rüdiger von Bergheim. As his opponent Conrad from Silesia withdrew for lack of support, Berthold was able to be elevated to be Bishop of Passau by Pope Innocent IV on 15 June 1250.

In the autumn of 1250 he moved into Passau with difficulties, where the deposed bishop Rüdiger had entrenched himself in the Veste Oberhaus. Thus he was confirmed by the Pope a second time as a bishop. It was not until 1251 that Bishop Nicholas of Újezd, near Prague, was able to give the consecration of priest and bishop. However his relationship with the citizens of Passau remained intact. For Berthold, his good relations with King Ottokar II were also helpful, which strengthened the Bohemian-Austrian influence in the bishopric.
