= Diocese of Passau =

Catholic diocese in Germany

Diocese of Passau Diœcesis Passaviensis Bistum Passau

Catholic
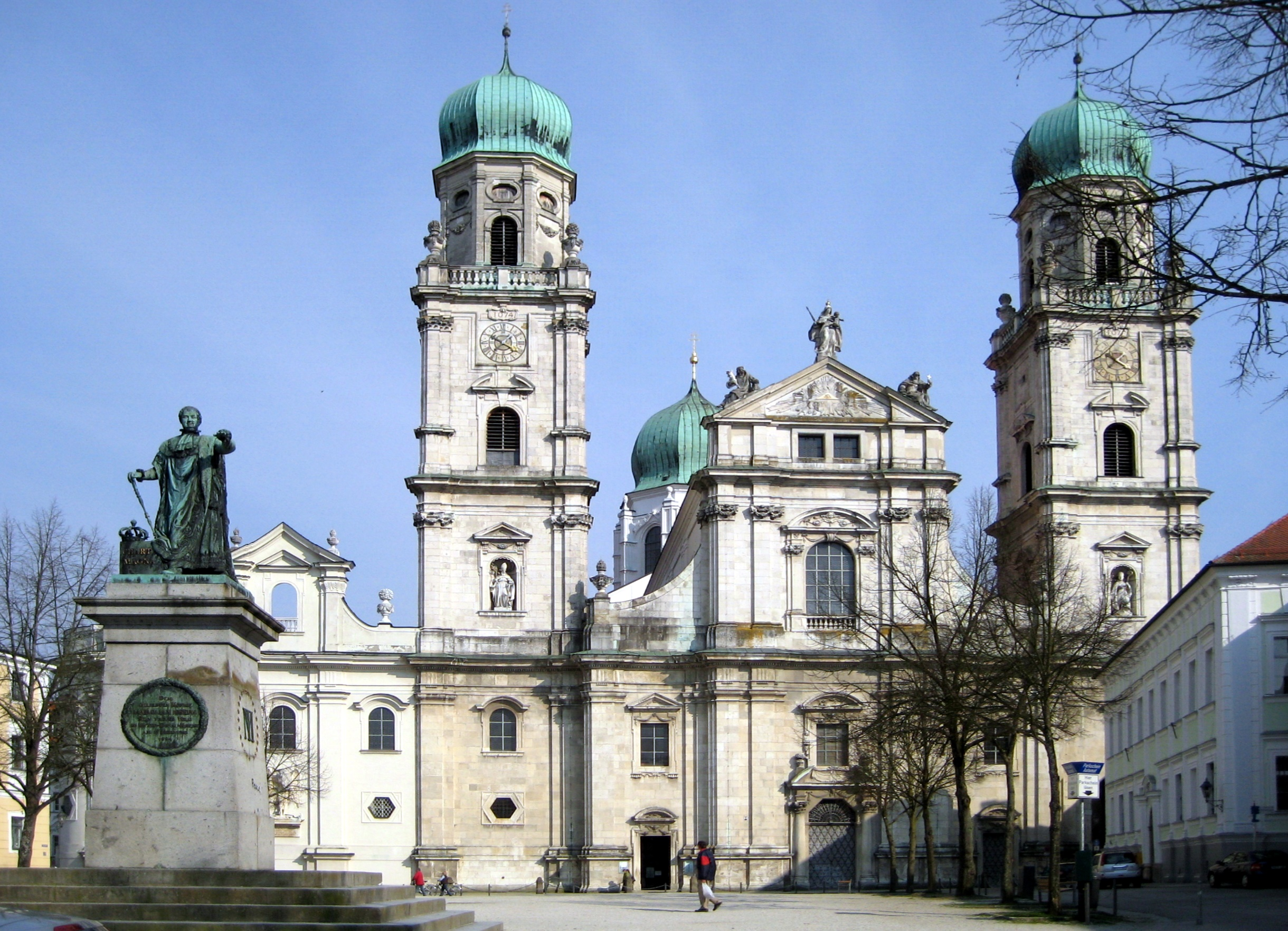
- St. Stephan's Cathedral, Passau

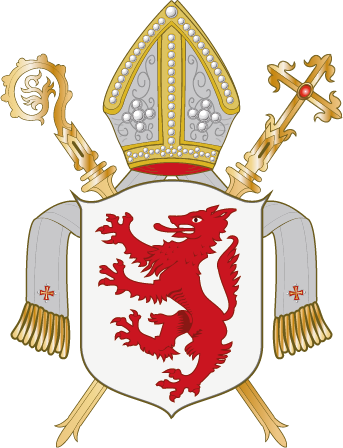
- Coat of arms

Location
- Country: Germany
- Ecclesiastical province: Munich and Freising

Statistics
- Area: 5,442 km^{2} (2,101 sq mi)
- Population: Total; Catholics: (as of 2021); 630,353; 466,750 (74.0%)
- Parishes: 285

Information
- Denomination: Catholic
- Sui iuris church: Latin Church
- Rite: Roman Rite
- Established: 739
- Cathedral: St. Stephan's Cathedral
- Patron saint: St. Conrad of Parzham; St. Maximilian of Celeia; St. Valentine
- Secular priests: 275 (diocesan); 65 (Religious Orders); 46 Permanent Deacons

Current leadership
- Pope: Leo XIV
- Bishop: Stefan Oster
- Metropolitan Archbishop: Reinhard Marx

Map
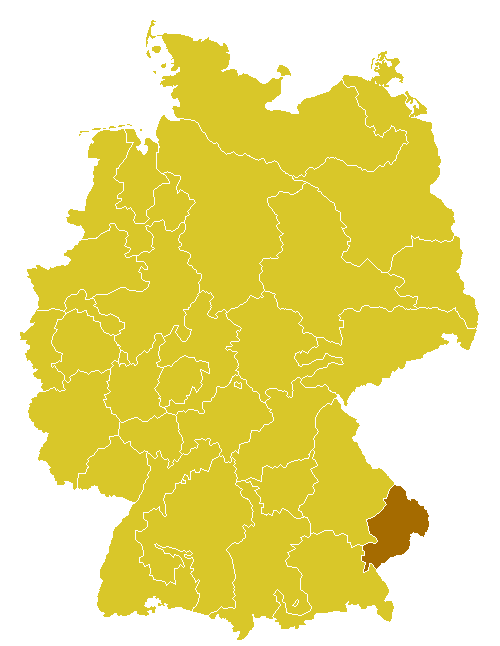

Website
- bistum-passau.de

The Diocese of Passau (Latin: Diœcesis Passaviensis; German: Bistum Passau) is a Latin diocese of the Catholic Church in Germany that is a suffragan of the Archdiocese of Munich and Freising. The Prince-Bishopric of Passau was an ecclesiastical principality that existed for centuries until it was secularized in 1803. The diocese covers an area of 5,442 km².

== History ==
=== Lorch ===
The Diocese of Passau may be considered the successor of the ancient Diocese of Lorch (Laureacum). At Lorch, a Roman station and an important stronghold at the confluence of the rivers Enns and Danube, Christianity found a foothold in the third century, during a period of Roman domination, and a Bishop of Lorch certainly existed in the fourth. The letter of Pope Symmachus (498–514) to Archbishop Theodore of Lorch is a forgery of Bishop Pilgrim. During the great migrations, Christianity on the Danube was completely rooted out, and the Celtic and Roman population was annihilated or enslaved.

=== Foundation of the diocese of Passau ===
In the region between the rivers Lech and Enns, the wandering Baiuvarii were converted to Christianity in the seventh century, while the Avari, to the east, remained pagan. The ecclesiastical organization of Bavaria was brought about in 739 by the papal legate St. Boniface, who, with the support of Duke Odilo or at least enacting an earlier design of the duke, erected the four sees of Freising, Ratisbon, Passau, and Salzburg. He confirmed as incumbent of Passau Bishop Vivilo, or Vivolus, who had been ordained in Rome by Pope Gregory III (731–741). From that time, Vivilo resided permanently at Passau, on the site of the old Roman colony of Batavis. Here there existed a church established by a founder now unknown, which was dedicated to St. Stephen. Bishop Vivilo's diocese received by annexation the ancient Lorch, which meanwhile had become a small place of little importance. Thanks to the duke, a cathedral was soon erected near the Passau church of St. Stephen, and there the bishop lived in common with his clergy.

The ecclesiastical province of Bavaria was created on 20 April 798, at the request of Charlemagne. Pope Leo III named Salzburg its metropolitan archdiocese, assigning as its suffragan dioceses Passau, Ratisbon, Freising, Säben-Brixen, and Neuburg and sending Bishop Arno of Salzburg the pallium. The diocese of Passau was subject to Salzburg until 1728; from 1728 until 1817 it was directly subject to the Holy See (Papacy); from 1826, it became subject to the archdiocese of Munich-Freising.

==== Diocesan boundaries ====
The boundaries of the Passau diocese extended westwards to the river Isar, and eastwards to the Enns. In ecclesiastical affairs Passau was probably, from the beginning, suffragan to Salzburg. Through the favour of Dukes Odilo and Tassilo, the diocese received many grants and endowments, and several monasteries were established, including Niederaltaich Abbey, Niedernburg Abbey, Mattsee Abbey, Kremsmünster Abbey, these being richly endowed over time. In the late 8th century came the conquest of the Avari, who had assisted the rebellious Duke Tassilo. Subsequently, under Bishop Waltreich (774–804), the district between the Enns and the Raab was added to the diocese, which thus included the whole eastern part (Ostmark) of Southern Bavaria and part of what is now Hungary.

=== Troubles with Moravia ===
Pope Eugenius II (824–827) was said to have sent a letter to four bishops in Moravia and Hungary (Pannonia), informing them that he had created Bishop Urolfus of Passau an archbishop, and made him metropolitan of an ecclesiastical province, which included the dioceses of Favianensis, Speculiiuliensis (also known as Ouguturensis), Nitravensis, and Vetuarensis. Only two of the diocesan names are known. The document, however, is a forgery. It was invented by Bishop Pilgrim, to advance his claim that the diocese of Passau was the successor of the (arch)diocese of Lorch, and was entitled to the pallium. Neither the German kings nor the popes ever acknowledged validity of the claim.

On 24 September 860, at the request of Bishop Hartwig of Passau, King Louis II granted a number of mansiones to Hartwig's chorepiscopus Alberic. But in May 864, Pope Nicholas I, writing to King Louis, noted that Bishop Hartwig of Passau had been paralysed for the previous four years (abhinc quattuor annos), but that he could not simply be deposed or set aside; he could, however, resign the diocese, if he were able to execute the proper documents.

The first missionaries to the pagan Hungarians went out from Passau, and in 866 the Church sent missionaries to Bulgaria.

Before the spring 873, a three year long struggle on the part of several German bishops attempted to unseat Bishop Methodius, the "Apostle to the Slavs." Pope John VIII (872–882) wrote to his legate in Germany and Pannonia, Bishop Paul of Ancona, ordering him to advise King Louis that Pannonia was directly subject to the Holy See (Papacy), and that he should inform Archbishop Alvinus of Salzburg and Bishop Ermericus of Passau that if they should deprive Bishop Methodius of his sacred ministry, the pope would do the same to them. Ermericus captured Methodius, kept him in prison during the bitter winter, held a meeting of bishops, and would have had Methodius beaten in public, were it not for the intervention of others. Pope John suspended Emericus, and summoned him, along with Bishop Paul and Bishop Methodius, to Rome for trial. He died on 2 January 874.

The Magyars made their first incursions into northern Italy in 899; in 900, they made their first raids into Bavaria. In July 900, Archbishop Dietmar of Salzburg, Bishops Waldo of Frising, Erchanbald of Eichstatt, Zacharias of Säben-Brixen, Tuto of Ratisbon, and Richarius of Passau, sent a letter of complaint to Pope John IX. They wrote that three bishops had come into the diocese of Passau from Moravia, Archbishop John and Bishops Benedict and Daniel, and had consecrated an archbishop and three bishops without the knowledge of the archbishop of Salzburg or the consent of the bishop of Passau. They reminded the pope of the good deeds of the kings of the Franks toward his predecessors; they refuted the charges of the Slavs; and they advised the pope not to believe the lies that they were telling about the Bavarian bishops.

Passau, the outermost eastern bulwark of the Germans, suffered most from the incursions of the Hungarians. At that time many churches and monasteries were destroyed. The canons of Passau suffered especially great losses. On 12 August 903, therefore, at the request of Counts Arbo and Engilmar, vassals of the Church of Passau, and with the consent of Bishop Burchard, King Louis IV agreed to the transfer of loca in Innveiertel, along with their decima and other appurtenances, which had previously been given as benefices by the bishop, to the power of the canons. This is the earliest clear mention of the canons of Passau as a single body. Additional invasions by Hungarians, usually damaging Passau, occurred in the incursion into Alemannia in 915 and 917, when Basel was destroyed and Alsace devastated; 921, centered on Thuringia and Saxony; 924, in which Franconia suffered; 925 in which Bavaria and Alemannia were attacked; and 926, when incursions reached Gallia.

When, after the victory the Battle of Lechfeld, the Germans pressed forward and regained the old Ostmark, Bishop Adalbert (946-971) hoped to extend his spiritual jurisdiction over Hungary. He was present at the Council of Ingelheim in 948, and his title is given as "bishop", not "archbishop."

=== Bishop Pilgrim ===
His successor, Bishop Piligrim (971-991), who worked successfully for the Christianization of Pannonia, aspired to free Passau from the metropolitan authority of Salzburg, but was completely frustrated in this, as well as in his attempt to assert the metropolitan claims which Passau was supposed to have inherited from Lorch, and to include all Hungary in his diocese. By founding many monasteries in his diocese he prepared the way for the princely power of later bishops. He also built many new churches and restored others from ruins.

=== Princes of the Empire ===
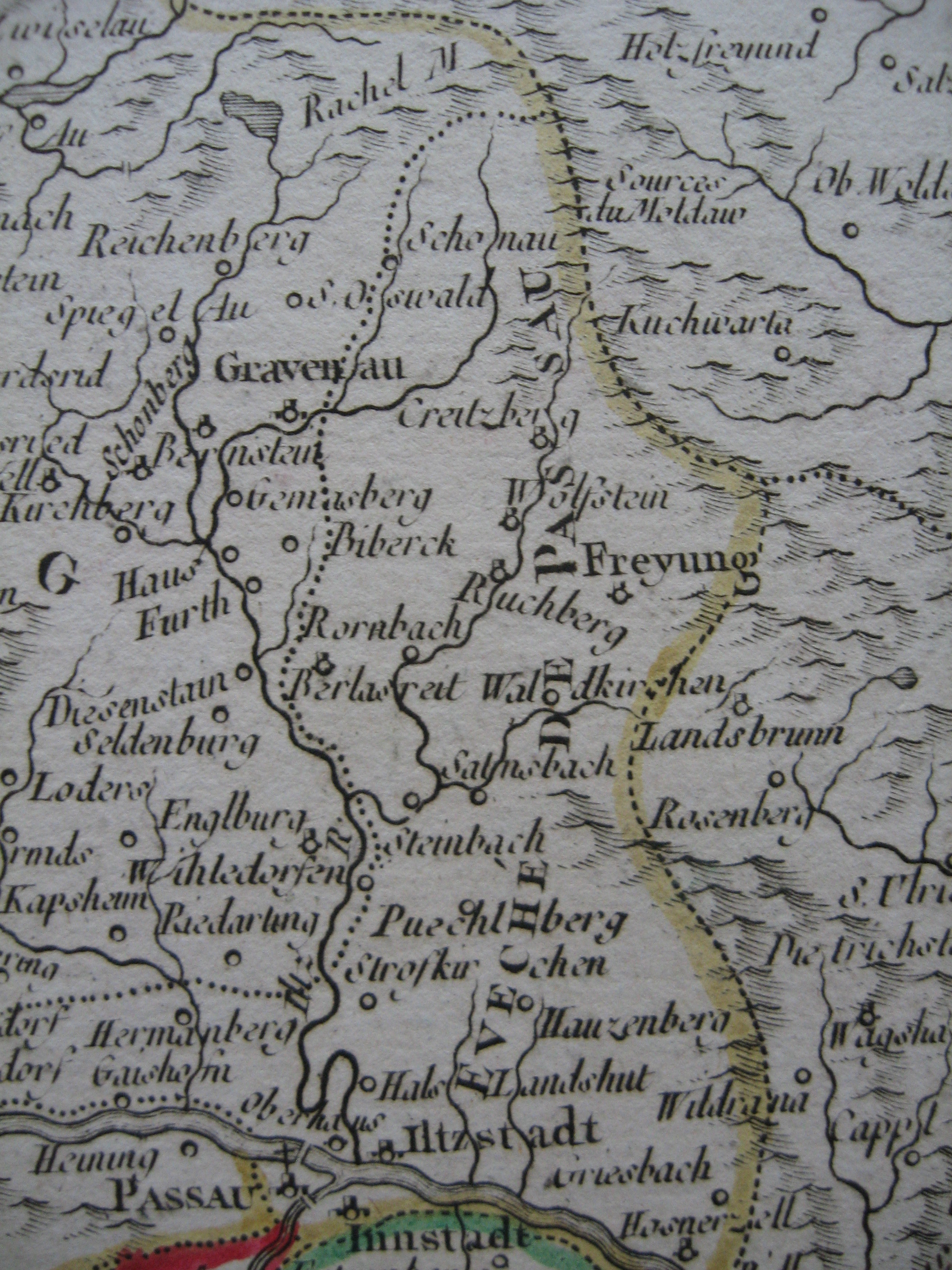
The Prince-Bishopric of Passau, circa 1760. It was much smaller than the diocese of the same name.

His successor, Christian (991–1002), received in 999 from Emperor Otto III the market privilege and the rights of coinage, taxation, and higher and lower jurisdiction. Bishop Christian attended the diet of Frankfurt in 1007, at which the decision was taken to establish the diocese of Bamberg, and in 1012 he participated in the consecration of its new cathedral. The Emperor Henry II granted him a large part of the North Forest. Henceforward, indeed, the bishops ruled as princes of the empire, although the title was used for the first time only in a document in 1193. Under Berengar (1013–1045) the whole district east of the Viennese forest as far as Letha and March was placed under the jurisdiction of Passau. During his time the cathedral chapter made its appearance, but there is little information concerning its beginning as a distinct corporation with the right of electing a bishop. This right was much hampered by the exercise of imperial influence.

At the beginning of the Investiture Controversy, Bishop Altmann occupied the see (1065–1091) and was one of the few German bishops who adhered to Pope Gregory VII. He served as papal legate of Pope Gregory. In 1175, he held a council in Passau, in which he had Pope Gregory's synodical letters of 1074 and 1075 read to the assembly; they mandated clerical celibacy. There was difficulty in enforcing the mandate, and Altmann wrote to the pope, who replied that if one of the clergy complied, he could be restored to his position, but if one refused, he was to be cut off completely. In 1080, Pope Gregory deposed Bishop Otto of Konstanz in the Roman synod of Lent, and ordered Bishop Altmann to travel to Konstanz and supervise the election of a proper bishop. In 1081, he commissioned Altmann to win back the archbishop of Salzburg and the other bishops who had gone over to King Henry IV, and that he should receive fraternally those who returned to papal obedience, in particular Bishop Benno of Osnabrück. In Easter Week 1085, Altmann attended a synod of bishops at Quindlenburg, presided over by the cardinal bishop of Ostia, in which Wezilo of Mainz; two weeks later, Wezilo and nineteen other schismatic bishops held a meeting at Mainz, and excommunicated fifteen bishops who were loyal to Gregory VII, including Altmann of Passau. Bishop Altmann was driven out of his diocese by his own clergy, who preferred King Henry and his Antipope Clement III. He was replaced by the schismatic Hermann, brother of Duke Liutold of Eppenstein of Carinthia.

Bishop Ulrich (1092–1121) was present at the synod held by Pope Urban II at Piacenza from 1–7 March 1095. He was for a time driven from his see by Emperor Henry IV, promoted monastic reforms and supported the Crusades. Reginmar (1121–1138), Reginbert, Count of Hegenau (1136–1147) who took part in the crusade of Conrad III, and Conrad of Austria (1149–1164), a brother of Bishop Otto of Freising, were all interested in the foundation of new monasteries and the reform for those already existing. Bishop Conrad attended the diet of Ratisbon on 17 September 1156, and witnessed the privilegium of the Emperor Frederick Barbarossa, in which he elevated the Ostmark of Austria into a duchy.

Bishop Diepold of Berg went on the Third Crusade with Frederick Barbarossa in 1189, accompanied by the dean of the cathedral, Tageno, whose diary contributed to later authors. Diepold died in Antioch on 3 November 1190, probably of some plague.

Bishop Ulrich (1215–1221), was formally recognized as a prince of the empire at the Reichstag of Nuremberg in January 1217. The reforms which were begun by bishops Gebhard von Plaien (1221–1232) and Rüdiger von Rodeck (1233–1250) found a zealous promoter in Otto von Lonsdorf (1254–1265), one of the greatest bishops of Passau. He took stringent measures against the relaxed monasteries, introduced the Franciscans and Dominicans into his diocese, promoted the arts and sciences, and collected the old documents which had survived the storms of the preceding period, so that to him we owe almost all our knowledge of the early history of Passau. Bishop Peter, formerly canon of Breslau, contributed to the House of Habsburg by bestowing episcopal fiefs on the sons of King Rudolph.

Cardinal Guido di Borgogna (Guy de Bourgogne), as papal legate, held a council in Vienna on 10 May 1267, attended, among many others, by Bishop Peter of Passau.

It was during this period that the Fürstenzell Abbey was founded, in 1274.

Bishop Godefrid presided over a diocesan synod, held at St. Pölten on 19 March 1284. Bishop Bernhard of Prambach held a diocesan synod in Passau in June 1293.

=== Passau without a bishop ===
Under Bernhard of Brambach (1285–1313), Passau started striving to become a free imperial city. After an uprising in May 1298, the bishop granted the burghers, in the municipal ordinance of 1299, privileges in conformity with what was called the Bernhardine Charter. The cathedral having been burned down in 1281, he built a new cathedral which lasted until 1662. Bishop Bernhard died on 27 July 1313.

The cathedral Chapter met as usual to select a successor, but the result was disorder. Two factions selected two different candidates, the larger part chose Canon Gebehard Walse, the minority Canon Albertus, the son of the King of the Romans. Gebehard went to Avignon, to lodge an appeal with Pope Clement V, who died on 20 April 1314 before the matter was resolved; Gebehard too died before a new pope was elected. Pope John XXII rejected Albert, who was under age and not in holy orders. He then, on 3 June 1317, appointed Henri of Vienne, the brother of Jean, the Dauphin of Viennois, who was also under age and not in holy orders. In fact, in April 1313, Pope Clement had granted Henri a license for seven years to study civil law, with the provision that he reside in one of his benefices. Then, on 6 September 1316, Pope John had written to the bishop of Grenoble that Henri wanted to resign all his benefices, and that the bishop should accept his resignations. Documents indicate that there was no bishop seated in Passau in 1317–1320, and that episcopal functions were being carried out by the bishop of Frising. Finally, Pope John XXII appointed Albert of Saxony to the diocese of Passau, on 14 June 1320, though he was only in minor orders, and rector of the parish of Vienna. On 22 June 1320 he was given the privilege of having all his ordinations carried out on the same day, by a bishop of his own choosing. He was ordained a subdeacon in Vienna, and ordained and consecrated in Salzburg by the archbishop in September 1321.

Bishop Albert von Winkel (1363–1380) was particularly active in the struggle with the burghers and in resisting the robber-knights. The Black Death visited the bishopric under Gottfried II von Weitzenbeck (1342–1362).

Bishop George von Hohenlohe (1388–1421) participated in the coronation of King Sigismund of Germany on 8 November 1414 at Aachen; from which he proceeded immediately to the Council of Konstanz, which he attended throughout its sitting, as a close advisor of King Sigismund. He recognized Pope John XXIII, and promoted an expedition against King Ladislaus of Naples. Pope John XXIII granted Bishop George a bull on 1 February 1415, in which he released Passau from all metropolitan subjection to the archbishop of Salzburg, as well as from their control as papal legates, and granted the bishops of Passau the right to use the pallium. After 1418, he was imperial chancellor, energetically opposed the Hussites.

At the request of the archbishop of Salzburg, Pope Martin V issued a papal bull on 6 August 1418, "intenta Semper", in which he cancelled the arrangements made by John XXIII with respect to Passau. Passau's archiepiscopal status was removed, and the bishops no longer received the pallium.

=== Frederick III, Sixtus IV, and Passau ===
During the time of Bishop Ulrich von Nussdorf (1451–1479) the diocese suffered its first great curtailment. At the request of the Emperor Frederick III, the Diocese of Vienna was established by Pope Paul II on 18 January 1469, out of territory taken from the Diocese of Passau. This diocese was afterwards further enlarged at the expense of Passau by Pope Sixtus IV. Towards the close of the fifteenth century the conflict between an Austrian candidate for the see and a Bavarian brought about a state of war in the diocese.

On 1 July 1478, at the request of the Emperor Frederick, Pope Sixtus IV issued the bull "Super Universas", in which he granted the emperor the right to name the next bishop of Passau on the death of Bishop Ulrich. The emperor conveyed the contents of the bull to the Provost, Dean, and Chapter of Passau, in a letter of 25 October 1478, with the warning that they faced excommunication and loss of imperially granted privileges if they transgressed the terms of the papal bull or the imperial rights.

Bishop Ulrich died on 2 September 1479, and in October, claiming that they had received no notice of the Emperor's candidate, they proceeded to their usual and customary election. The name of Canon Frederick Maurkircher was put forward by George, Duke of Bavaria, the son of Duke Louis IX. Maurenkircher was a Doctor of Law and Chancellor of the duchy. In a contentious electoral process, he was supported by Bishop Albertus of Salona, the auxiliary bishop of Passau; and by the Dean of the Chapter, and by six other canons; they were joined by the dean of the collegiate church of Mautern, the abbot of Aspach, the provost of the collegiate church of S. Nicholas, and by two vicars of the cathedral. The emperor's nominee was George Hasler, who had studied at the University of Vienna and been a follower of the Franciscan inquisitor, John of Capistrano. Hasler had gone to Rome following his studies, where he became a protonotary apostolic, and then a priest in the papal entourage. He returned to Germany, where he served as the emperor's secretary and councillor for more than ten years. In 1477, he was named a cardinal by Sixtus IV, over the objections of the College of Cardinals. The electors at Passau, in a letter to the pope, claimed that the emperor had not nominated his candidate within a reasonable time, but, in a decree of 28 January 1479, Pope Sixtus rejected their claim on grounds of canon law, which provided for as much as a six-month interval between death of an incumbent and nomination of a successor. Furthermore, their claim was beside the point, since they had violated the papal prohibition of an election. Sixtus therefore voided the election of Canon Frederick Maurenkircher, and threatened him with excommunication if he should persist in his claims and pretensions. On the same day, 28 January 1479, the pope provided (appointed) Cardinal George Hasler bishop of Passau.

Bishop Hasler was not welcomed in Passau. On 13 December 1480, Pope Sixtus issued an excommunication against Michael Loehmer, Commissary of the diocese of Passau, because he and his associates refused to turn over the property of the diocese to Cardinal Hasler, and tore down and defiled papal bulls and letters from the doors of the church in Vienna. On 8 January 1481, Pope Sixtus admonished Dukes Albert and George of Bavaria not to give aid and comfort to the enemies of Cardinal George Hasler who had already been excommuinicated by the pope. On 15 January 1481, Pope Sixtus provided faculties and orders to his nuncio in Germany, Bishop Orso Orsini of Theano, to cite the auxiliary bishop Albertus, Canon Frederick, and the other canons of Passau, to appear at the papal court and purge themselves of suspicion of heresy.

Cardinal Hasler died on 21 September 1482; his body was taken to Vienna, where he was buried in the church of S. Maria Stiegen. On 30 October 1482, Pope Sixtus IV appointed Bishop-elect Friedrich Maurenkircher to the bishopric of Passau.

=== Reformation ===
The Protestant Reformation was kept out of all the Bavarian part of the diocese, except the Countship of Ortenburg, by the efforts of Ernest of Bavaria who, though never consecrated, ruled the diocese from 1517 to 1541. Lutheranism found many adherents, however, in the Austrian portion. Bishops Wolfgang von Salm (1540–1555) and Urban von Trennbach (1561–1598) led the counter-Reformation. Under Bishop Wolfgang the Peace of Passau was concluded, in the summer of 1552. The last Bavarian prince-bishop was Urban, who in his struggles during the Reformation received substantial aid for the Austrian part of the diocese from Albert V, Duke of Bavaria, and, after 1576, from Emperor Rudolf II. All the successors of Urban were Austrians. Bishop-elect Leopold Ferdinand of Austria (1598–1625) (who also held the diocese of Strasburg after 1607) was one of the first to enter the Catholic League of 1609. In the Thirty Years' War he was loyal to his brother, Emperor Ferdinand II. Leopold II Wilhelm (1625–1662), son of Ferdinand II, a pious prince and a great benefactor of the City of Passau, especially after the great conflagration of 1662, finally united five bishoprics.

Bishop Wenzelaus von Thun (1664–1673) began the new cathedral which was completed thirty years later by his successor Cardinal John Philip von Lamberg. Bishop John Philip was named a cardinal by Pope Innocent XII on 21 June 1700. His nephew and successor, Bishop Joseph Dominicus von Lamberg (1723–1762), was appointed a cardinal by Pope Clement XII on 20 December 1737. They were brother and son to Franz Joseph I, Landgrave of Leuchtenberg, and both cardinals served as diplomats for the Austrian court.

=== Archdiocese ===
In November 1719, the Emperor Charles VI wrote to Pope Clement XI, requesting that he elevate the bishopric of Vienna to the rank of metropolitan see. The pope referred the proposal to the Consistorial Congregation, which reported favorably on 6 March 1721. Before the bulls could be prepared for signature, however, the pope died, on 19 March. The new pope, Innocent XIII, issued the bulls on 1 June 1722, and named Sigismund von Kollonitz to the archbishopric. When Vienna was raised to an archdiocese in 1722, Bishop Raymond von Rabatta relinquished the parishes beyond the Viennese Forest, but in compensation the diocese of Passau was exempted from the metropolitan authority of Salzburg, and became a metropolitan diocese itself, directly dependent upon the Holy See (Papacy); the bishop obtained the pallium for himself and his successors. Archbishop Leopold Ernst von Firmian (1763–1783), created cardinal by Pope Clement XIV on 14 December 1772, established an institute of theology at Passau, and, after the suppression of the Jesuits in 1773, founded a lyceum.

Under Archbishop Joseph von Auersperg (1783–1795), the Emperor Joseph II took away two-thirds of the diocese to form the dioceses of Linz and St. Pölten and to enlarge for the last time the archdiocese of Vienna. Pope Pius VI issued the bull "Romanus Pontifex" on 28 January 1784, establishing the diocese of Linz. On the same day, the pope issued another bull, "Inter plurimas," in which he established the diocese of St. Pölten, also partially on territory which had been part of the diocese of Passau.

The last prince-bishop, Leopold von Thun (1796–1826), saw the secularization of the old bishopric in 1803; the City of Passau and the temporalities on the left bank of the Inn and the right bank of the Ilz went to Bavaria, while the territory on the left banks of the Danube and of the Ilz went to Ferdinand III of Habsburg-Lorraine, the former Grand Duke of Tuscany, becoming part of the Electorate of Salzburg and afterwards to Austria. On 22 February 1803, when the Bavarians marched into Passau, the prince-bishop withdrew to his estates in Bohemia, and never revisited his former residence.

=== Reconstruction ===
After the abdication of Napoleon (1815), Maximilian I Joseph of Bavaria was confirmed as king of Bavaria by the Congress of Vienna, and as a member of the Federative Constitution of Germany, on 8 June 1815. There were adjustments in boundaries, the most significant being the transfer of Salzburg from Bavaria to Austria. New boundaries of ecclesiastical provinces and dioceses, therefore, had to be negotiated. A concordat between Bavaria and the Papacy was negotiated by Cardinal Ercole Consalvi and Baron Johann Casimir Häffelin, and signed on 5 June 1817. The diocese of Freising was suppressed and its territory incorporated into the diocese of Munich. Article IX granted the kings of Bavaria in perpetuity the right to nominate candidates to all the vacant archbishoprics and bishoprics in the kingdom, subject to papal approval.

On 1 April 1818, Pope Pius VII issued the bull "Dei ac Domini", in which he put into effect canonically the changes agreed to in the Concordat with Bavaria. He began by abolishing the ecclesiastical province of Ratisbon, with all the dioceses within it, including Passau, and the Provostship of Berchtesgaden. When the diocese was reconstituted, it contained, in addition to the city of Passau, 136 parishes, which are listed in the papal bull. The Chapter of the cathedral of S. Stephen in Passau was to consist of two dignities, the Provost and the Dean, and eight canons, four major and four minor. This was a reduction from the 23 canonries which had existed in the 18th century.

Passau was made directly subject to the Holy See until the death of the last prince-archbishop, Leopold von Thun, which took place on 22 October 1826. Thereafter, the diocese became a suffragan of Munich-Freising.

Pope Benedict XVI was born and baptized on Holy Saturday, 16 April 1927, at Marktl am Inn, which is located within the Diocese of Passau.

== Bishops of Passau ==
The auxiliary bishops of Passau are listed and annotated on a separate page.

=== To 1200 ===
No.	Name	from	to	Comments
	Valentin of Raetia	?	475	
	Vivilo	739	745?	Vivilo was consecrated a bishop by Pope Gregory III (731–741).
	Beatus	?	753/754	Beatus is known only from a versified episcopal list.
1	Sidonius	753	756	Nothing is known of his tenure as bishop. His dates are conjectural.
	Anthelm	?	?	Third or fourth bishop, Anthelmus' name appears in a versified episcopal list.
2	Wisurich	770	777	Bishop Wisurich witnessed a donation on 26 September 770; Wiserichus attended a synod of 6 bishops and 13 abbots at Dingolfing on 14 October 772.
3	Waldrich	777	804/805	Leo III wrote to Waldrich on 20 April 798. He was present at a synod of bishops at Reisbach on 20 January 799.
4	Urolf	804/805	806	The purported letter of Pope Eugenius II, mentioning Urolfus' pallium and his possession of Pannonia and Moesia, is a forgery of Bishop Pilgrim.
5	Hatto	806	817	
6	Reginhar	818	838	
	Vacancy	838	840	
7	Hartwig	840	866	
8	Ermanrich	866	874	
9	Engelmar	875	897	
10	Wiching	898	899	
11	Richarius	899	902	Richarius, Rihharius, Richar. He is said to have presided over the diocese for three years, and died before August 903, when Burkhard was already bishop.
12	Burkhard	903	915	
13	Gumpold	915	932	
14	Gerhard	932	946	The purported bull of Pope Agapetus II, confirming the pallium and metropolitan status of Passau, is a forgery.
15	Adalbert	946	970/971	
16	Piligrim	971	991	a member of the Sieghardinger dynasty. Pilgrim was a notorious forger of early documents of Passau.
17	Christian	991	1013	First bishop with secular authority
18	Berengar	1013	1045	
19	Egilbert	1045	1065	Engelbert
20	Altmann	1065	1091	
——	Hermann von Eppenstein	1085	1087	Intrusus. Schismatic counter-bishop of Henry IV, Holy Roman Emperor, brother of Duke Liutold of Eppenstein of Carinthia. He died in 1087.
21	Ulrich	1092	1121	Ulrich I.
22	Reginmar	1121	1138	
23	Reginbert of Hagenau	1138	1148	
24	Conrad of Babenberg	1148/1149	1164	Son of Leopold III, Margrave of Austria and Agnes von Waiblingen; Archbishop of Salzburg (September 1164–28 September 1168)
25	Rupert	1164	1165	Rupert supported the schism of Antipope Paschal III. He was dead by November 1165.
	Albo	1165	1168	Elected on 11 November 1165. Expelled from Passau in 1168 for supporting the pope against the emperor, he was replaced by Albert, the son of the King of Bohemia.
	Henry of Berg	1169	1172	resigned, later Bishop of Würzburg from 1191 until his death in 1197
26	Diepold of Berg	1172	1190	(Theobald). With permission of Pope Alexander III, Dietpold was consecrated on 23 September 1172 in Passau. He died in Antioch, after the interment of Frederick Barbarossa, on 3 November 1190.
27	Wolfger of Erla	1191	1204	Wolfger was appointed Patriarch of Aquileia by Pope Innocent III on 24 June 1204.

=== From 1200 to 1500 ===
No.	Name	from	to	Comments
28	Poppo	1204	1205	Cathedral provost of Aquileia. Poppo succeeded Wolfker, who was transferred to Aquileia by Pope Innocent III on 24 June 1204; he served from 15 October 1204, and died on 26 December 1205.
29	Manegold of Berg	1206	1215	M. died on 9 June 1215.
30	Ulrich	1215	1221	
31	Gebhard von Plain	1222	1232	
32	Rüdiger of Bergheim	1233	1250	Bishop of Chiemsee 1216–1233; excommunicated and deposed by Pope Innocent IV in 1250.
—	Konrad	1248	1249	Uncanonically elected in summer 1248, but never confirmed by pope. Called himself Electus Pataviensis in 1249.
34	Berthold of Pietengau	1250	1254	B. was appointed by the papal legate, Cardinal Petrus de Collemedio, Bishop of Albano, and approved by Pope Innocent IV on 1 October 1250.
35	Otto of Lonsdorf	1254	1265	Otto died on 9 April 1265.
36	Wladislaw of Silesia	1265	1265	Previously Provost of Vyšehrad and a papal chaplain, Ladislaus (Wlodislaus) was elected bishop of Passau on 2 May 1265. He was appointed archbishop of Salzburg by Pope Clement IV on 10 November 1265, despite problems with his holy orders and age. Ladislaus' replacement in Passau was appointed on 24 November 1265. Archbishop Ladislaus died on 27 April 1270.
37	Petrus	1265	1280	Canon of Breslau
38	Wichard of Pohlheim	1280	1282	
39	Gottfried	1282	1285	Gottfried of Westphalia was a Protonotary and Chancellor of Rudolph I of Germany, German king
40	Bernhard of Prambach	1285	1313	
Vacancy due to disputed election		1313	1317	
	Albert II, Duke of Austria	1313	1313	Canon of Passau
	Gebhard Walso	1313	1315	Canon of Passau
41	Henri de la Tour-du-Pin	1317	1319	Bishop-elect only, never ordained or consecrated.
42	Albert II of Saxe-Wittenberg	1320	1342	
43	Gottfried of Weißeneck	1342	1362	Gottfried was the brother of Ordulf of Wiesseneck (1343–1365). He had been Provost of Passau.
44	Albert von Winkel	1363	1380	Albert had been Dean, then Provost, of the cathedral Chapter.
45	Johann of Scharffenberg	1381	1387	Joannes had been Provost of the cathedral Chapter of Passau, since 1374 or 1376. He died on 3 February 1387.
46	Hermann Digni	1387	1388	Hermann had been Dean of the cathedral Chapter. He was elected bishop, but rejected by Pope Urban VI. Hermannus Electus et Decanus and the Chapter nonetheless renewed the covenant between the diocese and the archdukes of Austria on 13 October 1387. On 31 August 1388, as bishop-elect and Dean, he approved the election of the Provost of St. Pölten.
47	Rupert of Jülich-Berg (de Monte)	1388	1390	On 13 March 1389, Rupert was transferred to the diocese of Paderborn by Pope Urban VI, who died on 15 October 1389.
48	George von Hohenlohe	1390	1423	George was named Apostolic Administrator of Strigonia (Esztergom) on 22 December 1418, by Pope Martin V. He died on 8 August 1423.
49	Leonhard of Laiming	1423/1424	1451	
50	Ulrich of Nußdorf	1451	1479	
51	George Hessler	1480	1482	Hessler, a protonotary apostolic and imperial counsellor, was named a cardinal by Pope Paul II on 10 December 1477.
52	Friedrich Mauerkircher	1482	1485	Friedrich was canonically elected by the Chapter of Passau in September 1479, but was not able to take his seat due to the intrusion of Cardinal Hessler. After the cardinal's death, Pope Sixtus IV reappointed him. He was not regularly in Passau, due to his office of Chancellor of the duke of Bavaria.
53	Frederick of Öttingen	1485	1490	Elected on 2 December 1485; confirmed by Pope Innocent VIII on 15 February 1486. He died on 3 March 1490, not having received the regalia from the emperor, and never having been consecrated a bishop.
54	Christopher of Schachner	1490	1500	

=== From 1500 to 1826 ===
No.	Name	from	to	Comments
56	Wiguleus Fröschl of Marzoll	1500	1516	
57	Ernest of Bavaria	1516	1541	Coadjutor of Bishop Fröschl, who died on 6 November 1516. Bishop-elect, but never consecrated. Administrator only.
57	Wolfgang von Salm	1541	1555	Provost of cathedral Chapter. Elected by the Chapter on 11 November 1540, approved by Pope Paul III on 18 February 1541. Died 5 December 1555.
58	Wolfgang von Closen	1555	1561	Wolfgang had been Provost of the cathedral of Passau. He was elected by the cathedral Chapter on 20 December 1555, and approved by Pope Paul IV on 12 June 1556. He died on 7 August 1561.
59	Urban von Trennbach	1561	1598	Issued "Statuta Capitulis" on 15 August 1594.
60	Leopold Ferdinand of Austria	1598	1625	Named coadjutor-bishop of Bishop Urban in 1598, aged 12. Bishop Urban died on 9 August, but Leopold not allowed administratorship until 1 December 1604. Resigned, to marry, in November or December 1625. He was never consecrated, and was thus bishop-elect.
61	Leopold Wilhelm of Austria	1625	1662	Elected coadjutor of Passau on 8 November 1625, with the consent of Bishop Leopold Ferdinand and the approbation of Pope Urban VIII. Never ordained or consecrated, thus bishop-elect.
62	Charles Joseph of Austria	1662	1664	
63	Wenzeslaus von Thun	1664	1673	
64	Sebastian von Pötting	1673	1689	
65	Johann Philipp von Lamberg	1689	1712	Named a cardinal by Pope Innocent XII on 21 June 1700. He died on 20 October 1712.
67, no. 29.	Raymund Ferdinand, Count of Rabatta	1713	1722	
68	Joseph Dominicus von Lamberg	1723	1761	Named a cardinal by Pope Clement XII on 20 December 1737. He died on 30 August 1761.
69	Joseph Maria von Thun	1761	1763	Bishop of Gurk (1741–1762) Elected by the Chapter of Passau on 19 November 1761, and approved by Pope Clement XIII on 29 March 1762. He died on 15 June 1763.
70	Leopold Ernst von Firmian	1763	1783	Named a cardinal by Pope Clement XIV on 14 December 1772. He died on 13 March 1783.
71	Joseph Francis von Auersperg	1783	1795	Named a cardinal by Pope Pius VI on 30 March 1789. He died on 21 August 1795.
72	Thomas Johann Kaspar von Thun und Hohenstein	1795	1796	Titular Bishop of Thyateira and suffragan bishop of Passau (1776–1795), Dean and Canon of Passau with prebend. Elected bishop of Passau by the Chapter on 4 November 1795, confirmed by Pope Pius VI on 18 December 1795, died on 7 October 1796.
73	Leopold Leonhard von Thun und Hohenstein	13 Dec 1796	22 Oct 1826	Canon domicellaris, then Canon capitularis of Passau. Elected by the Chapter on 13 December 1796, confirmed by Pope Pius VI on 24 July 1797, consecrated bishop in Passau on 29 August 1797 by Bishop Joseph von Arco of Seckau. Last Prince-Bishop.

=== Since 1826 ===
No.	Name	from	to	Comments
74	Karl Joseph, Baron of Riccabona	25 Dec 1826	25 May 1839	
75	Heinrich of Hofstätter	6 Jul 1839	12 May 1875	
76	Joseph Francis Weckert	4 Oct 1875	13 Mar 1889	
77	Antonius von Thoma	24 Mar 1889	23 Oct 1889	
78	Michael von Rampf	8 Dec 1889	29 Mar 1901	
79	Anton von Henle	3 Apr 1901	18 Oct 1906	
80	Sigismund Felix, Baron of Ow-Felldorf	18 Oct 1906	11 May 1936	
81	Simon Konrad Landersdorfer, OSB	11 Sep 1936	27 Oct 1968	
82	Antonius Hofmann	27 Oct 1968	15 Oct 1984	
83	Franz Xaver Eder	15 Oct 1984	8 Jan 2001	
84	Wilhelm Schraml	13 Dec 2001	1 Oct 2012	
85	Stefan Oster	24 May 2014	Incumbent	

== See also ==
- List of auxiliary bishops of Passau

== Sources ==
=== Reference works for bishops ===
- Gams, Pius Bonifatius (1873). Series episcoporum Ecclesiae catholicae: quotquot innotuerunt a beato Petro apostolo (in Latin). Ratisbon: Typis et Sumptibus Georgii Josephi Manz. pp. 300–302.
- Eubel, Conradus, ed. (1913). Hierarchia catholica (in Latin). Vol. 1 (Tomus I) (second ed.). Münster: Libreria Regensbergiana.. Archived
- Eubel, Conradus, ed. (1914). Hierarchia catholica (in Latin). Vol. 2 (Tomus II) (second ed.). Münster: Libreria Regensbergiana. Archived
- Eubel, Conradus; Gulik, Guilelmus, eds. (1923). Hierarchia catholica (in Latin). Vol. 3 (Tomus III) (second ed.). Münster: Libreria Regensbergiana.. Archived.
- Gauchat, Patritius (Patrice) (1935). Hierarchia catholica. Vol. 4 (Tomus IV) (1592–1667). Münster: Libraria Regensbergiana.
- Ritzler, Remigius; Sefrin, Pirminus (1952). Hierarchia catholica medii et recentis aevi. Vol. 5 (Tomus V) (1667–1730). Patavii: Messagero di S. Antonio.
- Ritzler, Remigius; Sefrin, Pirminus (1958). Hierarchia catholica medii et recentis aevi. Vol. 6 (Tomus VI) (1730–1799). Patavii: Messagero di S. Antonio.
- Ritzler, Remigius; Sefrin, Pirminus (1968). Hierarchia Catholica medii et recentioris aevi (in Latin). Vol. VII (1800–1846). Monasterii: Libreria Regensburgiana.
- Remigius Ritzler; Pirminus Sefrin (1978). Hierarchia catholica Medii et recentioris aevi (in Latin). Vol. VIII (1846–1903). Il Messaggero di S. Antonio.
- Pięta, Zenon (2002). Hierarchia catholica medii et recentioris aevi (in Latin). Vol. IX (1903–1922). Padua: Messagero di San Antonio. ISBN 978-88-250-1000-8.

=== Studies ===
- Brackmann, Albertus (ed.). Germania pontificia, Vol. 1, Pars I: Provincia Salisburgensis et episcopatus Tridentinus. (in Latin). Berlin: Weidmann 1910. [Passau: pp. 157–257].
- Erhard, Alexander (1864). Geschichte der Stadt Passau. Volume 1 Passau: F. W. Keppler, 1864.
- Hansiz, Marcus. Germaniae sacræ: Metropolis Lauriacensis cum Episcopatu Pataviensi. (in Latin). Tomus I (1727). Augusta Vindelicorum (Augsburg): Happach & Schlüter.
- Higby, Chester P. (1918). The Religious Policy of the Bavarian Government During the Napoleonic Period. New York: Columbia University Press, 1918.
- Kappel, Johann Evangelist (1912). Der Dom des hl. Stephan zu Passau in Vergangenheit und Gegenwart. (in German). Regensburg: Manz, 1912.
- Leidl, August (1993). Das Bistum Passau zwischen Wiener Konkordat (1448) und Gegenwart: Kurzporträts der Passauer Bischöfe, Weihbischöfe, Offiziale (Generalvikare) dieser Epoche. (in German). Passau: Passavia Universitätsverlag und -druck, 1993.
- Meindl, Konrad (1875). Geschichte der ehemals hochfürstlich-passauischen freien Reichsherrschaft des Marktes und der Pfarre Obernberg am In. Vol. 1. (in German). Linz: Katholische Pressverein 1875.
- Monumenta Boica: Codices Traditionum Ecclesiae Pataviensis, olim Laureacenses. (in German and Latin). Vol. 28, 2. München: Typis Academicis, 1830.
- Monumenta Boica: Authentica episcopatus Pataviensis (in German and Latin). Vol. 31, 2. München: Typis Academicis, 1837.
- Pez, Hieronymus (1721). Scriptores rerum Austriacarum, Tomus 1. (in Latin). Leipzig: Sumptibus Joh. Frid. Gleditschii b. filii, 1721. [ "Breve Chronicon Laureacensium et Pataviensium Archiepiscoporum et Episcoporum", pp. 3–8; "Anonymi Poetae Vetustissimi Versus", pp. 7–10; "Alius Recentior Catalogus", pp. 15–20.]
- Roach, Levi (2022). "Forging Episcopal Identity: Pilgrim at Passau", in: Forgery and Memory at the End of the First Millennium. Princeton University Press, 2022, pp. 61–112.
- Rotermundt, Joseph ALois (1833). Geschichte der Begründung des Klerikal-Seminars in Passau. (in German). Passau: Ambrosi, 1833.
- Schöller, Joseph (1844). Die Bischöfe von Passau und ihre Zeitereignisse. (in German). Pustet, 1844
- Schrödl, Karl (1879). Passavia sacra: Geschichte des Bisthums Passau bis zur Säkularisation des Fürstenthums Passau. (in German) Hauptband. 1. Passau: Waldbauer 1879.
- Wurster, Herbert W. (1994). Das Bistum Passau und seine Geschichte: Von den Anfängen bis zur Jahrtausendwende. (in German). Eckbolsheim: Editions du Signe, 1994.
- Zurstrassen, Annette (1989). Die Passauer Bischöfe des 12. Jahrhunderts: Studien zur ihrer Klosterpolitik und zur Administration des Bistums : Vorarbeiten zu den Regesten der Passauer Bischöfe. (in German). Bern: Wiss.-Verlag Rothe, 1989.

=== External links ===
Lins, Joseph (1911). "Passau, diocese of." In: The Catholic Encyclopedia. Ed. Charles Hebermann. Volume 11 New York: Appleton, 1911, PP. 519-521.
