= Reginbert =

Reginbert may refer to:

- Reginbert of Reichenau (d. 846), monk and librarian
- Reginbert of Seldenbüren (d. 964), legendary founder of Saint Blaise Abbey, Black Forest
- Reginbert of Brixen (d. 1140), bishop of Brixen
- Reginbert of Hagenau (d. 1148), bishop of Passau

== See also ==
- Raginpert, king of the Lombards (701)
