= Gumpold (bishop of Passau) =

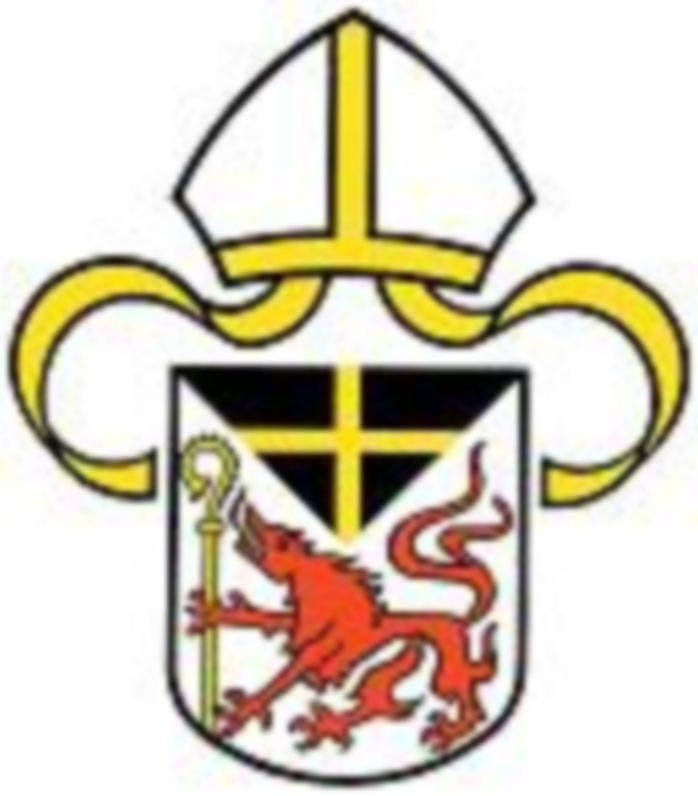
Bistumswappen of Passau.

Gumpold (fl.932) was from 915 to 932 the 15th bishop of Passau.

He was a relative of the preceding Bishop, Burkhard, Bishop of Passau

Because of the occupation of his bishopric by the Hungarians he was severely hampered in his leadership. Gumpold probably took part in the Synod of Hohenaltheim.
