= Bernhard of Prambach =

The Right Reverend Bernhard von Prambach
- Bishop of Passau
- Church: Catholic Church
- Diocese: Diocese of Passau
- Appointed: May 1285
- Term ended: 27 July 1313
- Predecessor: Gottfried of Westphalia
- Successor: Henri, Dauphin of Viennois (1317)
- Previous post: Canon of Passau

Orders
- Rank: Bishop

Personal details
- Born: Bernhard von Prambach c.1220
- Died: 27 July 1313 (aged 92–93) Passau, Holy Roman Empire
- Buried: Passau Cathedral
- Denomination: Roman Catholic
- Residence: Passau
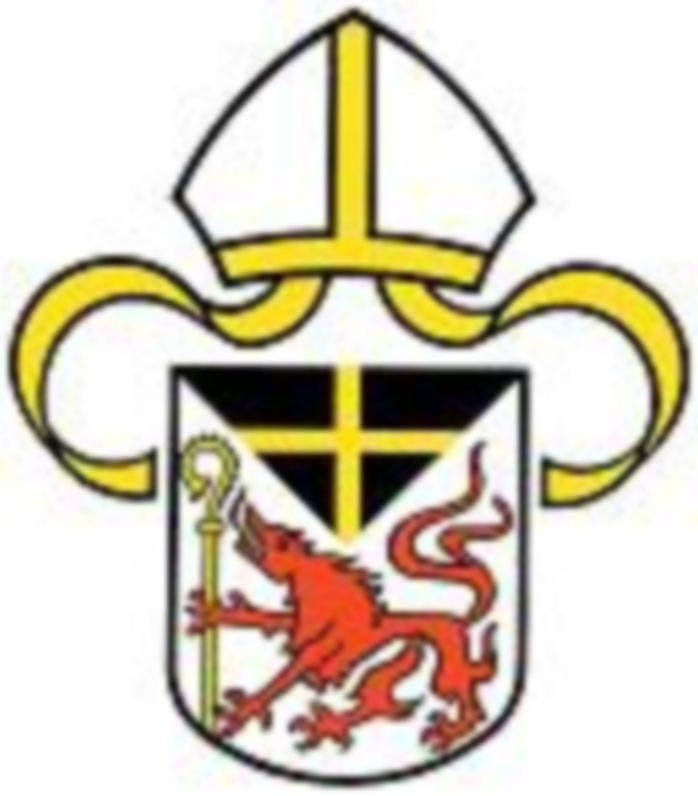
- Coat of arms

Bernard von Prambach, also known as Wernhard (around 1220 – 27 July 1313) was the 42nd Bishop of Passau from 1285 to 1313.

== Life ==
In 1279, Bernhard was already parish priest of Vienna and Canon of Passau, when he was appointed judge by Pope Nicholas III in a lawsuit between the abbot of Lilienfeld and the Provost of S. Pölten.

Bernhard was elected bishop in May 1285, and held a Synod in Ilzstadt in 1288. In the first week of July 1288, he consecrated the new abbot of the monastery of Osterhofen, Ulrich von Holzheim; previous to that, the monastery of canons regular had been governed by provosts.

He also invited several diocesan controversies among them 1293 (according to which the clergy had to wear simple costumes), in March 1294 in St. Pölten (the plundering and firefights were debated), and again in Passau (1302) on whether St. Gotthard was compulsory for the whole bishopric.

From the year 1293 Bernhard paid special attention to the Cistercian order. In Engelhartszell, on the estate inherited from his parents, he founded a new Cistercian penitentiary: the Engelszell monastery.

In May 1298 the Passau citizenship rose to an insurrection, the object of which was to press for Passau to a Reichsstadt, with which the bishop would have lost his position as a Stadtherr. At the end of November, at the Reichstag in Münster, the arbitration by King Albert I took place, which caused the insurrection to fail and thus put an end to the aspirations of the Passau citizens to independence. The citizens accepted the conditions of peace - among other things, even the town hall fell into the possession of the bishop - and Bernhard was once again the unqualified master of the city. Nevertheless, on 15 August 1299 he issued the so-called "Bernardine miunicipal charter", a new binding city law, which was very advanced and extended compared to the previous city charter. This new legal system lasted more than 500 years, until 1806.

Bishop Bernhard died on 27 July 1313.

The conversion of the Romanesque cathedral, which was damaged by the city fire of 1181, is now largely Gothic.

== Sources ==
- Eubel, Conradus, ed. (1913). Hierarchia catholica (in Latin). Vol. 1 (Tomus I) (second ed.). Münster: Libreria Regensbergiana.. Archived
- Hansiz, Marcus. Germaniae sacræ: Metropolis Lauriacensis cum Episcopatu Pataviensi. (in Latin). Tomus I (1727). Augusta Vindelicorum (Augsburg): Happach & Schlüter.
