= Ulrich I =

Ulrich I may refer to:

- Ulrich I, Duke of Brno (died 1113)
- Ulrich I, Bishop of Passau (c. 1027–1121)
- Ulrich I, Duke of Carinthia (died 1144)
- Ulrich I, Count of Württemberg (1226–1265)
- Ulrich I, Lord of Hanau (c. 1255/1260 – 1305/1306)
- Ulrich I, Count of Celje (1331-1368)
- Ulrich I, Duke of Mecklenburg-Stargard (before 1382–1417)
- Ulrich I, Count of East Frisia (1408–1466)
- Ulrich I, Duke of Württemberg (1487–1550)
