= Weckert =

Weckert is a surname. Notable people with this surname include:

- John Weckert, Australian philosopher
- Joseph Francis of Weckert (1822–1889), German bishop
- Noel and Sophia Weckert, Australian murder victims
- Werner Weckert (born 1938), Swiss cyclist

== See also ==
- Wecker (surname)
