= Wisurich =

5th Bishop of Passau

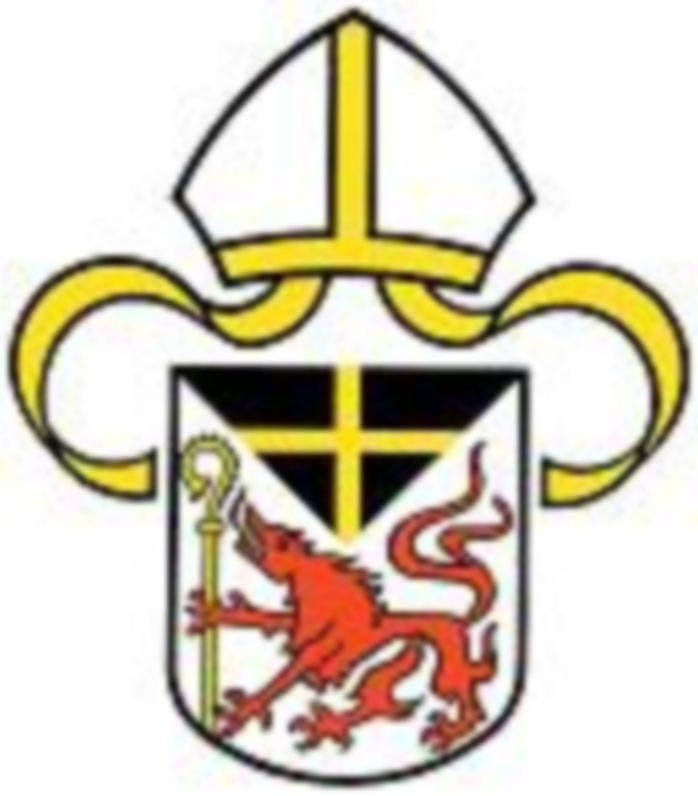
Bistumswappen of Passau.

Wisurich of Passau (777) was the 5th Bishop of Passau from 770 to 777.

There is not much known about the life and work of Wisurich. Like his predecessor, Anthelm, he was a German. He took part in the Landessynode of Dingolfing in 770. He did several valuable acquisitions for the Diocese of Passau. Under his pontificate the bones of St. Valentine were transferred from Rätia to Passau.
