= Peter (bishop of Passau) =

Peter of Passau (Latin: Petrus Passaviensis; died between 19 and 23 February 1280 in Tulln on the Danube) was from 1265 to 1280 Prince-Bishop of Passau.

== Biography ==
Petrus, from 1257 to 1264, exercised the office of a canon in Breslau, and at the same time served as the courtmaster of the Duke Vladislav of Silesia. In 1265 he accompanied him to study in Padua, where both received the academic degree of master's degree. In the same year Vladislav was elected bishop of Passau, and half a year later archbishop of Salzburg. Finally, on 24 November, Pope Clement IV, who had reserved the seat of both bishoprics, appointed Peter as Bishop of Passau.

In 1267 Peter mediated the conflict between King Ottokar of Bohemia, who occupied the city of Passau in 1266, and Henry, the Duke of Lower Bavaria. In May 1267 he took part in a synod in Vienna. On 11 June 1267, he gave his former colleague, Vladislav, the priestly ordination, and the following day the ordination.

In 1274 he called for a diocesan synod to Passau, and in October he took part in a provincial synod in Salzburg, which confirmed and extended the resolutions of Vienna. In the same year, he moved from Ottokar to the side of King Rudolf of Habsburg, which resulted in extensive privilege confirmations, including the preservation of the Innnoll at Obernberg. Peter built the first bridge in Passau.
