= Adalbert (bishop of Passau) =

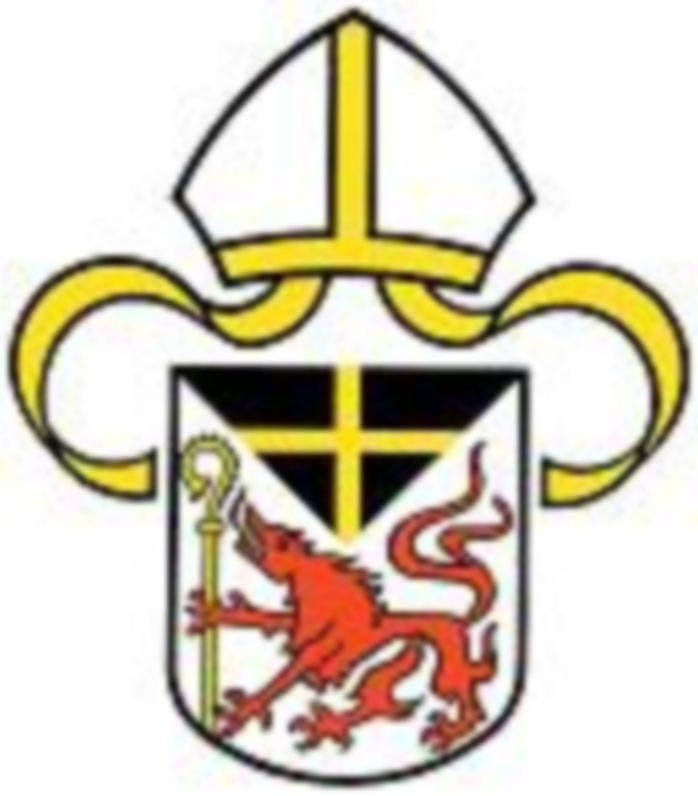
Bistumswappen of Passau.

Adalbert (died 15 June 970) was the 17th Bishop of Passau from 946 to 970.

In his reign was the fateful battle on the Lechfeld of 955, in which Emperor Otto I defeated the Hungarians. For the Diocese of Passau, this meant that it was now again able to exert its effectiveness in the land below the Enns (i.e. Lower Austria).
