= Hatto (bishop of Passau) =

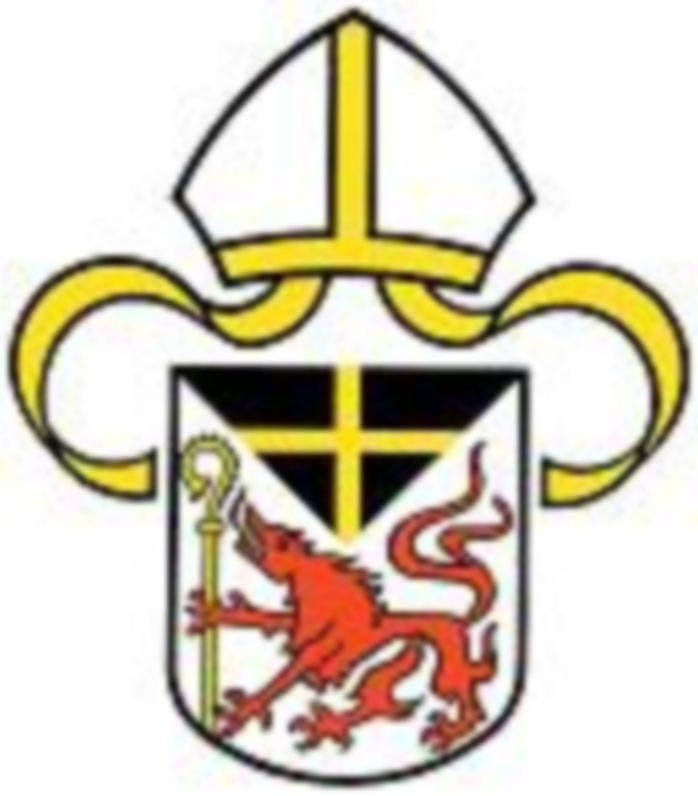
Bistumswappen of Passau.

Hatto (fl.817) was from 806 to 817 the 8th Bishop of Passau.

Hatto was present in 807 on a provincial synod in Salzburg. Provisions on the use of the tenths were adopted.
