= Vivilo =

Vivilo (also Vivolus) was the first bishop of the Roman Catholic Diocese of Passau after the reorganization of the Bavarian Catholic church, appointed by Saint Boniface in 739. Vivilo is the only one of four new bishops mentioned in a letter by Pope Gregory III confirming the establishments of four dioceses in Bavaria—that of Passau, Regensburg, Salzburg, and Freising.

From his name it can be concluded that he was probably from Anglia. The bishops' ordination was given to Vivilo around 731/737 in Rome by Pope Gregory III personally.

Due to a lack of sources, there is little known about Vivilo. Documents and letters from the tenth century claimed that Vivilo had been Bishop of Lauriacum before his Passover, and then moved his seat to Passau (Lorcher fakes). Thus, claims of the Diocese of Passau should be based on a privilege against the Archbishopric of Salzburg for the church organization in the East.
