= Leonhard von Laiming =

German prince-bishop

- Bishop of Passau
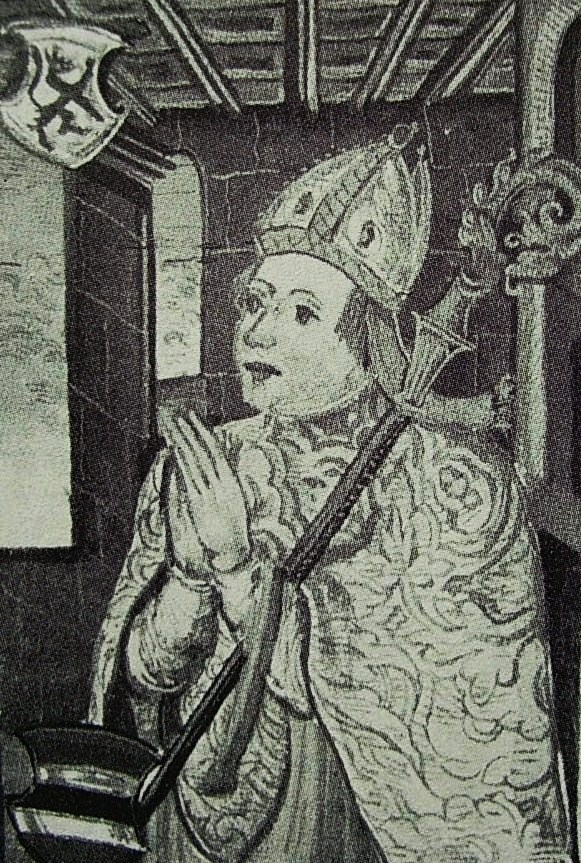
- Church: Roman Catholic
- Diocese: Roman Catholic Diocese of Passau
- In office: 1424–1451
- Predecessor: George of Hohenlohe
- Successor: Ulrich of Nußdorf

Personal details
- Born: 1381; Rosenheim
- Died: 24 June 1451 (aged 69–70); Passau

Leonhard von Laiming (1381 – 24 June 1451) was a German prince-bishop of Passau from 1424 until his death in 1451.
