= Waldrich (bishop of Passau) =

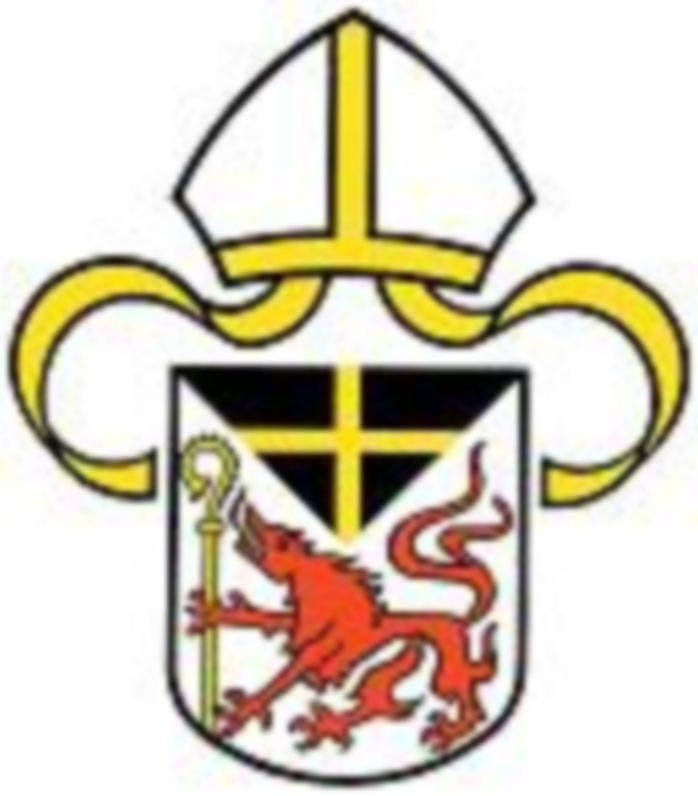
Bistumswappen of Passau.

Waldrich (* unknown; † 22 August 804) was the seventh Bishop of Passau from 777 to 804.

There is not much known about the life and work of Waldrich. He succeeded Wisurich of Passau. In his office, the expansion of the diocesan borders falls to the east, to the rivers March and Leitha. In addition, Passau was subordinated to the new metropolis of Salzburg as a suffragan bishopric. Like many of his successors, Waldrich vehemently, but in the end unsuccessfully resisted this subordination.
