= Albo von Passau =

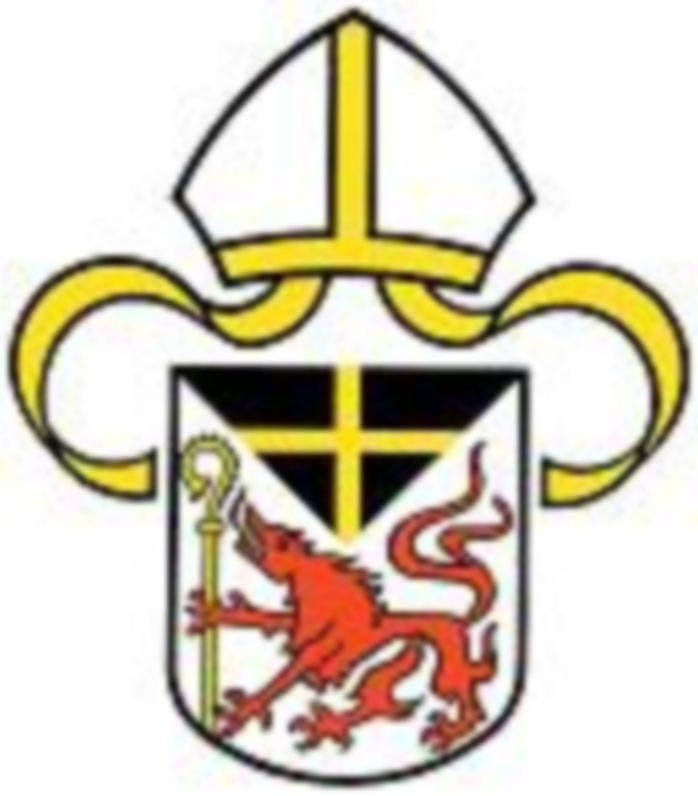
Bistumswappen of Passau.

Albo(no) (year of birth unknown - after 1177 in Freising) was from 1165 to 1169 the 28th Bishop of Passau.

== Biography ==
Until his appointment as bishop, Albo was a canon in Passau and provost in Moosburg. Having been appointed during the schism between Pope Alexander III and Antipope Paschal III he tried to keep a middle ground. In an effort to break neither with Alexander III nor with emperor Frederick Barbarossa who backed Paschal, he did not accept consecration by either Archbishop Conrad II of Salzburg who was loyal to Alexander nor Archbishop Christian I of Mainz who was Frederick's Archchancellor. In 1169 he had to abdicate after a profound disagreement with the cathedral chapter and the citizens of Passau. Albo attempted to get the emperor to reinstate him. Frederick however did not do so, likely because of Albo's earlier refusal to get consecrated by the Archbishop of Mainz. He became a canonist in Freising, where he may have been born and where he died sometime after 1177.
