= Beatus (bishop of Passau) =

Medieval bishop

Beatus was the second bishop of Passau from 746/747 to approximately 754 AD.

Although Beatus is not listed in any of the many bishops' lists, his existence is beyond doubt due to recent research.
