= Egilbert (bishop of Passau) =

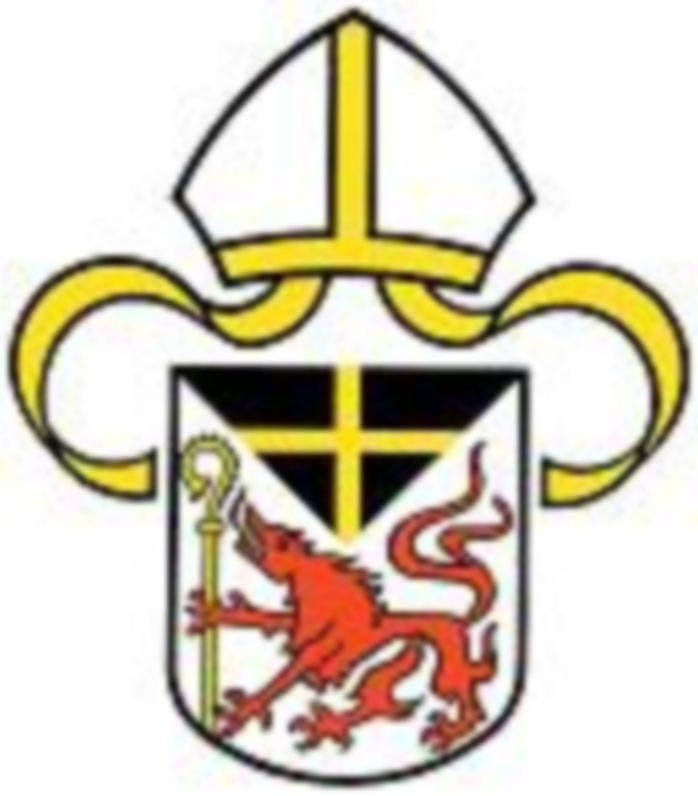
Bistumswappen of Passau.

Egilbert (also Engelbert, b. 17 May 1065 in Passau) was the 21st Bishop of Passau, from 1045 to 1065.

Egilbert probably came from the Rhine-Franconian region and was related to Gundekar II, Bishop of Eichstatt, and to Siegfried, Archbishop of Mainz.

He was the court chaplain of Empress Agnes. After his elevation to Bishop, he called a canonist into the restored St. Florian Monastery. The Agapitus chapel, the churches of Ernstbrunn and Korn and Trainskirchen were consecrated by him.

In 1050 he built the parish of St. Paul and consecrated the new church. On 15 August 1051, Emperor Henry III. On his campaign against the Magyars at Bishop Egilbert and a year later the Emperor traveled with Pope Leo IX to Passau. 1058 and 1063 Emperor Henry IV stayed in Passau.

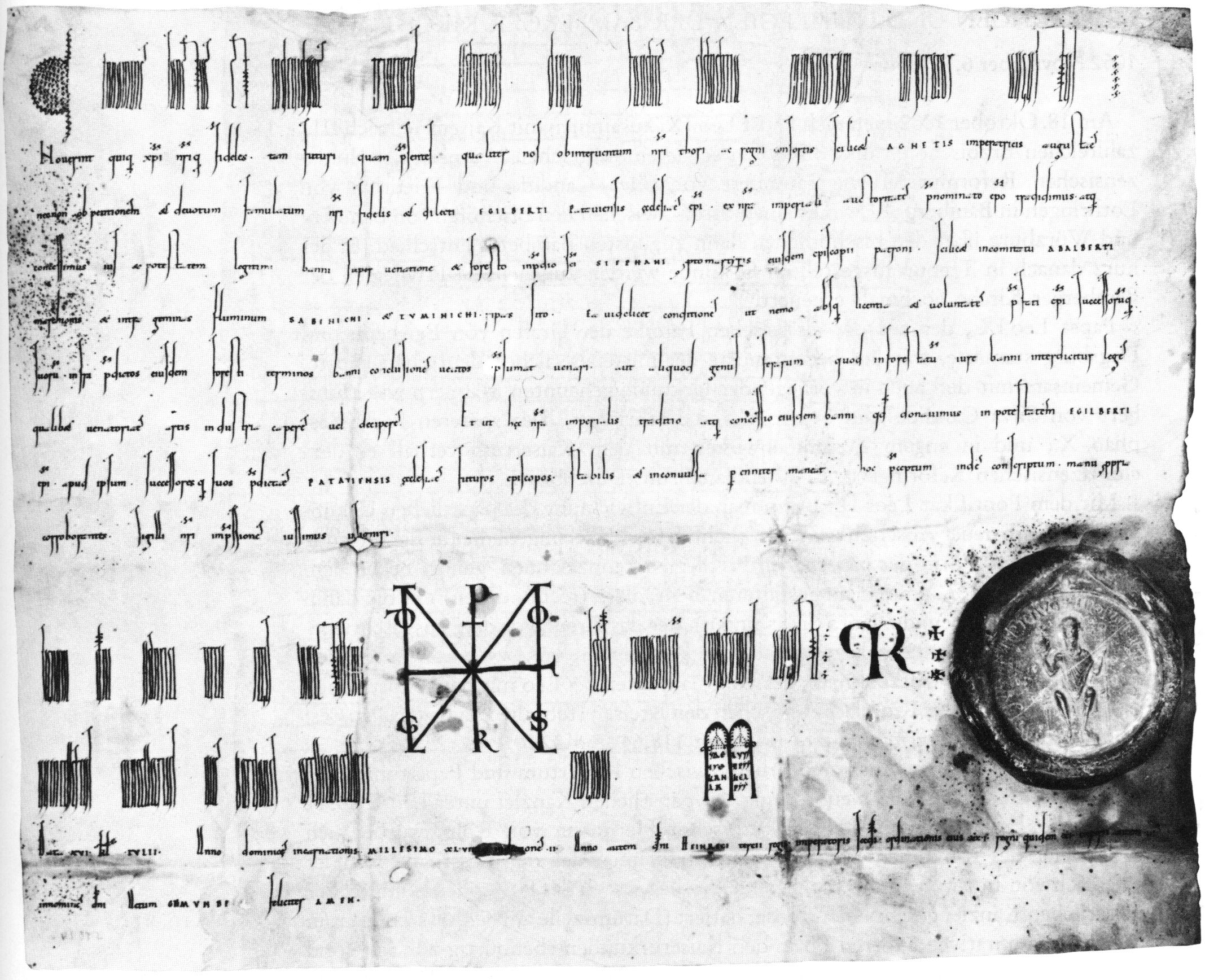
Emperor Henry III, charter of 1049

Emperor Henry III received several property confirmations for Passau churches as well as the game and forestry.

The first testified seal of a Passau bishop is from him, dated 12 November 1046. The earliest Passau coinage dates back to this time. His attention was devoted to the elevation of monastic discipline in his bishopric.
