= Wenzeslaus of Thun =

- Bishop of Gurk and Passau
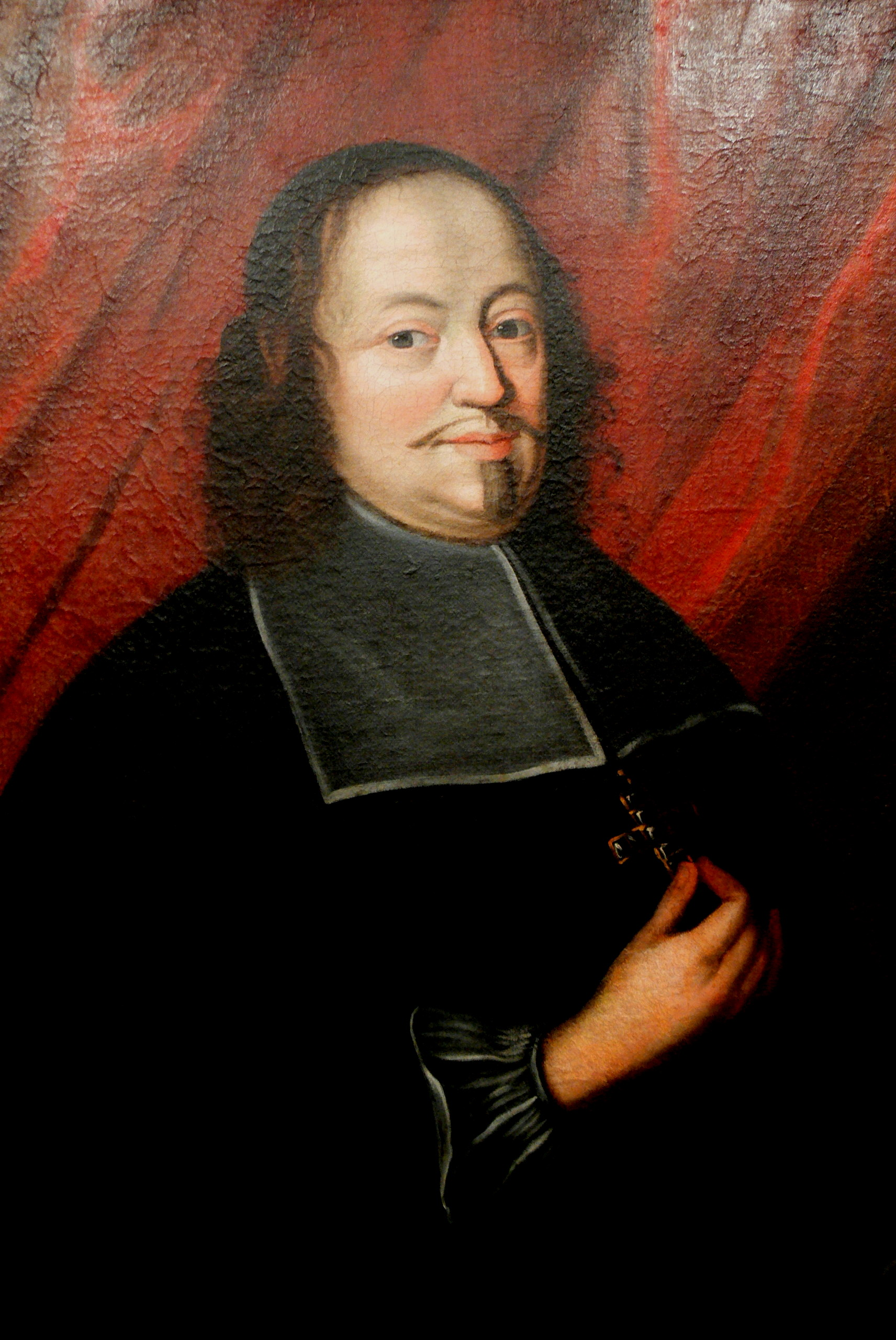
- Portrait of Wenceslaus of Thun (1629-1673)
- Native name: Václav z Thun
- Church: Catholic Church
- Diocese: Diocese of Gurk; Diocese of Passau
- In office: Gurk: 1665–1673; Passau:1664–1673
- Predecessor: Gurk: Sigismund Francis; Passau: Charles Joseph
- Successor: Gurk: Polykarp von Kuenburg; Passau: Sebastian von Pötting

Orders
- Ordination: 1655
- Consecration: 20 April 1664 by Guidobald of Thun

Personal details
- Born: 13 August 1629 Tetschen, Leitmeritzer Kreis, Kingdom of Bohemia, Holy Roman Empire
- Died: 6 January 1673 (aged 43) Passau, Prince-Bishopric of Passau, Holy Roman Empire

Wenzeslaus of Thun (13 August 1629 – 6 January 1673) was a Czech clergyman and bishop for the Roman Catholic Diocese of Passau.

== Biography ==
Wenzeslaus was born on 13 August 1629 in Děčín. He was the son of Count Johann Sigismund of Thun und Hohenstein and his second wife Anna Margareta of Wolkenstein. He was the half-brother of the two Salzburg prince-archbishops Guidobald and Johann Ernst von Thun und Hohenstein.

Wenzeslaus of Thun und Hohenstein was ordained a priest in 1655.

During the city fire of 1662, Wenzeslaus of Thun was the Passau cathedral-provost and, after St. Stephen's Cathedral had been partially destroyed by the flames, advocated building a modern baroque cathedral. To do this, he got the Italian master builder Carlo Lurago from Prague, who was commissioned to build a baroque cathedral, integrating the remains of the Gothic cathedral.

Just two years after the city fire, the only 35-year-old Wenzeslaus, who had previously been a canon in Salzburg and a capitular in Passau, was elected on 27 March 1664 to succeed Karl Joseph of Austria and thus become the new prince-bishop. The episcopal consecration followed on 20 April.

On 10 August 1665 he was also elected Bishop of Gurk.

He dedicated his reign as Prince Bishop of Passau to the reconstruction of the cathedral and the repair of the damage caused by the Thirty Years' War. In addition, a serious quarrel arose between him and the Passau Jesuits, which ultimately even entailed the withdrawal of priestly training for the Jesuits.

Wenzeslaus of Thun died on 6 January 1673 in Passau. He was the first bishop to be buried in the newly built bishop's crypt under St. Stephen's Cathedral in Passau. His monument is to the left of the high altar.

== Sources ==
- Roswitha Juffinger, Christoph Brandhuber: Wenzel Graf von Thun (1629-1673). In: Roswitha Juffinger (Hrsg.): Erzbischof Guidobald Graf von Thun 1654–1668. Ein Bauherr für die Zukunft. Residenzgalerie, Salzburg 2008, ISBN 978-3-901443-32-9, pp. 39–42.
- Franz Mader: Tausend Passauer. Biographisches Lexikon zu Passaus Stadtgeschichte. Neue-Presse-Verlags-GmbH, Passau 1995, ISBN 3-924484-98-8.
- Jakob Obersteiner: Die Bischöfe von Gurk. 1072–1822 (ISSN 0067-0642). Verlag des Geschichtsvereins für Kärnten, Klagenfurt 1969, pp. 392–396.
