= Christian (bishop of Passau) =

Bishop of the Diocese of Passau

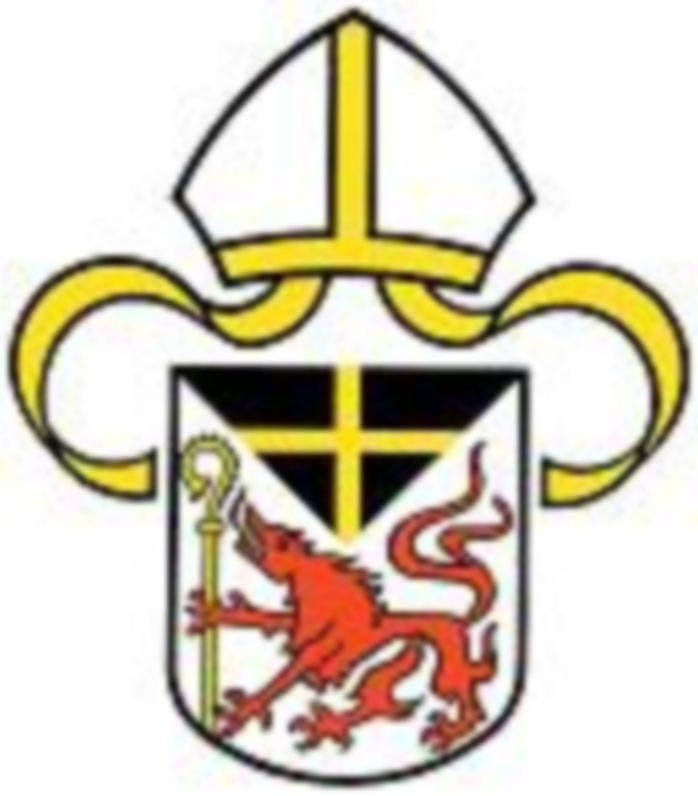
Bistumswappen of Passau.

Christian von Passau (September 1013 – ?) was the 19th Bishop of the Diocese of Passau from 991 to 1013. He was also the first bishop who had secular rule over the city of Passau.

== Life ==
Christian possibly came from the Saxons and belonged to the cathedral chapter of Hildesheim. In 991 he became Bishop of Passau. In 993 King Otto III confirmed his entire possession of the Passau church with a special mention of the Kremsmünster and Mattsee abbeys, the chapel of Ötting and the court of Reut. With this confirmation, the emperor took the church of Passau under his protection. Also in 993, Christian of Otto III. The granting of the freedom of services to any person, especially the Duke of Bavaria, with the restriction that the Passau Church was obliged to perform the royal and imperial power. The bishop thus became richly endowed and endowed with princely sovereign rights.

In 996 Christian joined Otto and took part in his imperial crown and synod. In 999 he received from Otto III. The law of market, customs, ban, and mint as well as the entire public authority within and outside the city of Passau. Thus he became a town with the privileges hitherto reserved for the king.

In the year 1002 he accompanied Duke Henry IV of Bavaria to the king's election to Mainz and chose him as king. In 1007 he took part in the Frankfurt Synod. He signed the founding protocol of the Bishopric of Bamberg, possibly in 1012 when he was consecrated.
