= Reginhar (bishop of Passau) =

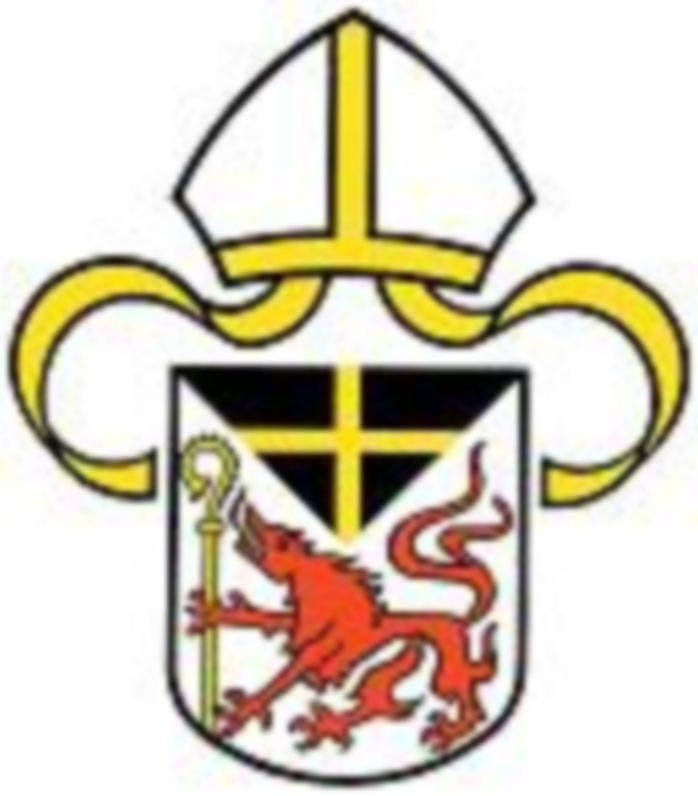
Bistumswappen of Passau.

Reginhar (also Reginar, Latin Reginharius, OHG Reginheri, † 838) was the 9th Bishop of Passau.

The origin of Reginhar is not known, although it is theorized he had been Bishop of Passau at the latest since 818. Under Reginhar the bishopric received various donations, including from King Ludwig the Pious 823 in Lower Austria. In 829, the border to the Archbishopric of Salzburg was redefined at Raab and Spratzbach. 833 and 836 received the bishopric donations in "Awarenland" (Bavarian Ostmark) by King Ludwig the Germans. In older writings his scholarship and his exemplary life change are praised.

His life and significance are no longer certain, as the news about him was changed in the 13th century by the documents known as the "Forgeries of Lorch". In this way, special demands of the bishopric should be substantiated by appropriate "evidence" from the early period. It is therefore unlikely that he was ordained as Archbishop of Passau, as it is handed down. It is also uncertain whether the mission area of the bishopric reached as far as Moravia, as a title apostolus Mavarorum (Apostle of the Moravians) is to suggest.

After his death, the diocese was sedis vacantia for two years.
