= Karl Joseph, Baron of Riccabona =

Italian clergyman and bishop (1761–1839)

Coat of arms of Karl Joseph von Riccabona

Karl Joseph, Baron of Riccabona (born 1761 in Cavalese) was an Italian clergyman and bishop for the Roman Catholic Diocese of Passau. He was ordained in 1783. He was appointed bishop in 1826. He died in 1839.
