= Sidonius (bishop of Passau) =

Medieval bishop

Sidonius was a Bishop of Passau, perhaps the third bishop, in the mid-8th century, perhaps from about 754 to 764.

Jean Mabillon (1632–1707) conjectured that he had the same origins as Virgilius, Scottish or Irish, and that they came to Germany together to follow Boniface, "Apostle to the Germans."

A deacon named Sidonius appears as a witness in litigation concerning the Cella of S. Maximinus, against the priest Ursus, with whom Bishop Virgilius had a suit c. 748 (?).

Sidonius belonged to the circle of the (later) bishop of Salzburg, Virgilius, and had a reputation as a theologian.

In a letter of Pope Zacharias to Saint Boniface, Sidonius is referred to as a priest. In a letter of 1 July 746, the pope notes that Sidonius and his associate Virgilius, apparently on instructions from Boniface, had been rebaptizing Christians who had been baptised by other priests with the formula, "Baptizo te in nomine Patria, et Filia, et Spirita sancta;" the pope points out that this was not introducing error or heresy, but mere ignorance of good Latin, and the rebaptizing by Sidonius and Virgilius should cease.

On 1 May 748, Pope Zacharias wrote again to Boniface, inter alia about the priests Virgilius and Sidonius. Virgilius was accused of trying to drive a wedge between the legate Bishop Boniface and Duke Otilo of Bavaria, by blackening the reputation of Boniface, who had accused Virgilius of wandering away from Catholic doctrine (adversum te, pro eo quod confundebattur a te erroneum se esse a catholica doctrina). Pope Zacharias was also distressed that Virgilius and Sidonius were propagating a theory about the antipodes which the pope called perversa et iniqua doctrina They claimed that there was another land (mundus) under the earth (terra), and other people and another sun and moon.

Pope Zacharias died on 15 March 752.

Marcus Hansiz pointed out that the name of Sidonius does not appear in the early episcopal lists of Passau. In a manuscript from the library of the monastery of Tergensee, compiled c. 1500, the following is found: "Sidonius, secondus, anno Domini DCCXLV Archiepiscopus Laureacensis eligitur Pataviae et sedit annis XII." ('Sidonius was the second, elected archbishop of Lorsch in Passau in 745, and held the seat for 12 years.') This source makes no room for the alleged second bishop of Passau, Beatus. It also obviously misstates the beginning of his tenure, since he was still only a priest in 748.

== Sources ==
- Brackmann, Albertus (ed.). Germania pontificia, Vol. 1, Pars I: Provincia Salisburgensis et episcopatus Tridentinus. (in Latin). Berlin: Weidmann 1910.
- Hansiz, Marcus. Germaniae sacræ: Metropolis Lauriacensis cum Episcopatu Pataviensi. (in Latin). Tomus I (1727). Augusta Vindelicorum (Augsburg): Happach & Schlüter. Pp. 130-135.
- Pez, Hieronymus (1721). Scriptores rerum Austriacarum, Tomus 1. (in Latin). Leipzig: Sumptibus Joh. Frid. Gleditschii b. filii, 1721. [ "Breve Chronicon Laureacensium et Pataviensium Archiepiscoporum et Episcoporum", pp. 3-8; "Anonymi Poetae Vetustissimi Versus", pp. 7-10; "Alius Recentior Catalogus", pp. 15-20.]
