= Poppo (bishop of Passau) =

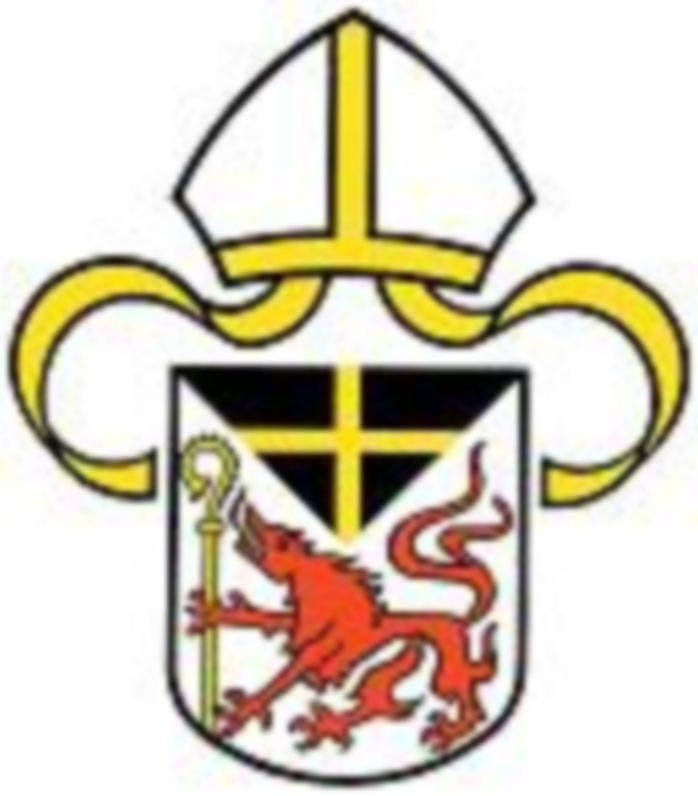
Bistumswappen of Passau.

Poppo of Passau was Bishop of Passau from 1204 to 1206.

Poppo, before taking over his office, was Dompropst of Aquileia Cathedral.
