= Urolf =

9th-century religious leader

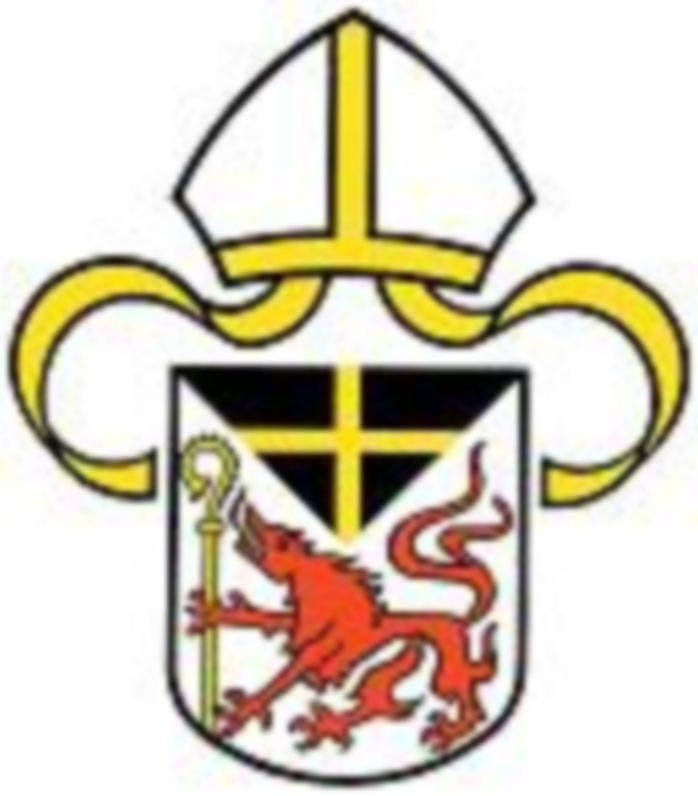
Bistumswappen of Passau.

Urolf (* / † unknown) was the seventh Bishop of Passau from about 804 to 806.

The Domstift could acquire several donations under his rule: Schärding, Machendorf, Schalchen and Andießen.
