= Leopold Leonard, Count of Thun =

Czech nobleman (1748-1826)

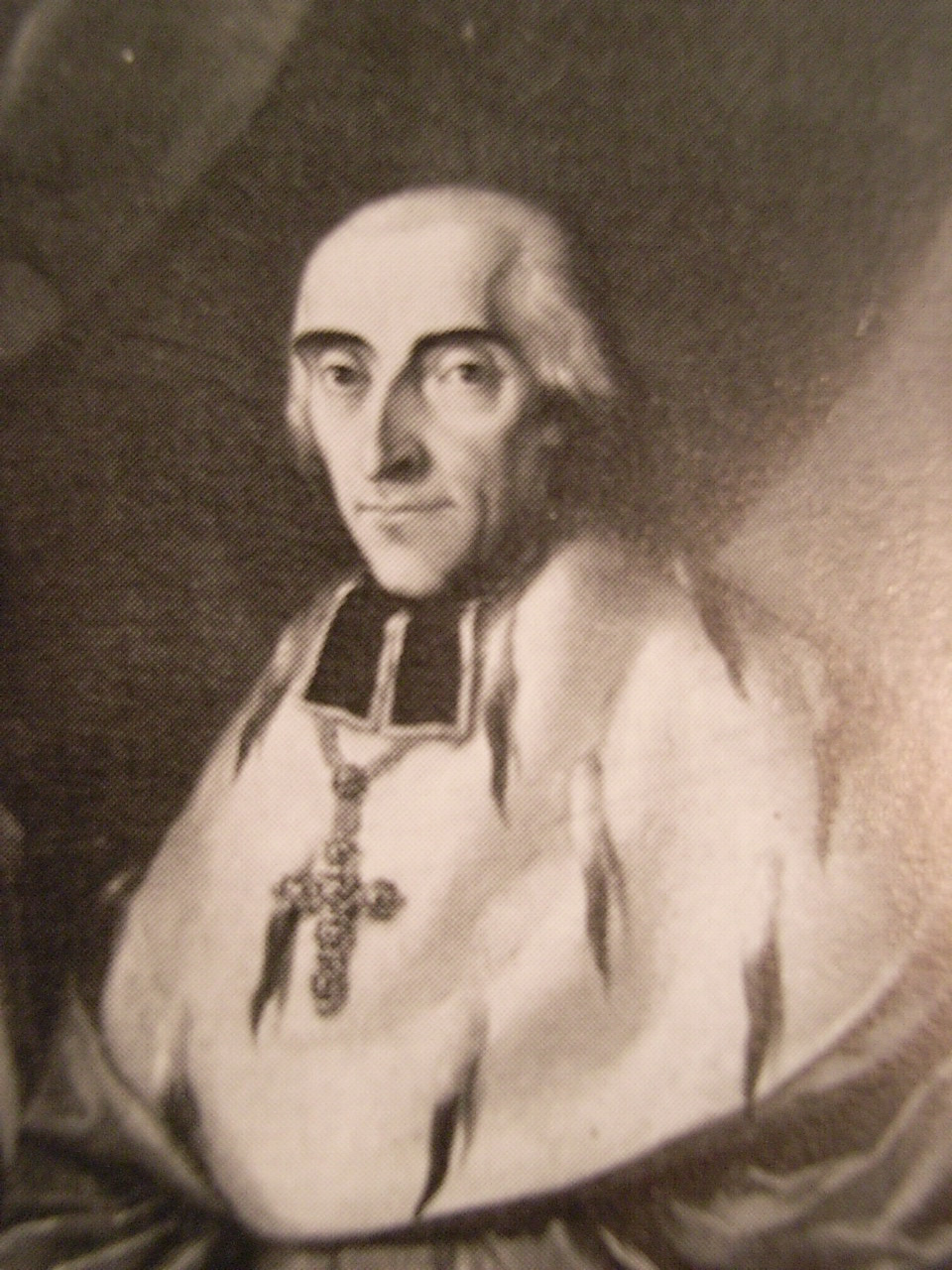
Leopold Leonard

Leopold Leonhard Raymund Count of Thun and Hohenstein (17 April 1748 – 22 October 1826 at Košíře) was the 73rd Bishop of Passau and the last Prince-Bishop of Passau.

== Life ==
Leopold Leonhard was born on 17 April 1748, in Děčín. He was the youngest of twelve children from the first marriage of Johann Joseph Count von Thun and Hohenstein with Maria Christiana Countess of Hohenzollern and Hechingen.

Thun had been a canonist in Passau since 1768 and was ordained in Litoměřice on 10 September 1771. In 1787, he became a cathedral capitular in Passau. In 1795, he was appointed a Dompropst, and on 29 May 1796 he became auxiliary bishop and vicar general.

After the death of his cousin, the prince-bishop Thomas Johann Graf von Thun and Hohenstein, he was elected by the chapter of the cathedral on 13 December 1796 as his successor. Papal confirmation followed on 24 July 1797. On 27 August 1797, he received the ordination of bishops through Seckauer Prince Bishop Joseph Adam Count of Arco in Passau Cathedral.

On 22 February 1803, the Hochstift Passau was abolished by the Reichsdeputationshauptschluss and divided between the electorate of Salzburg and the electorate of Bavaria, Thun left the controversy in the hands of Bavarian Minister Montgelas Passau in June 1803 and did not return.

He refused to acknowledge the changes that had occurred. Thun handed over his business affairs to his general vicar, Count Auersperg, and episcopal functions to his auxiliary bishop, Karl Kajetan von Gaisruck. In 1804 he let himself be dispensed with his residence. When the General Vicar Auersperg Passau also left in 1806, confused administrative conditions prevailed.

His tomb, built by Václav Prachner, can be found in the cemetery of the Lesser Side (Malostranský hřbitov) in Smíchov in Prague. Leopold Leonhard Count von Thun and Hohenstein lived up to his death on his property in Cibulka near Prague, the business in the bishopric of Passau took the spiritual council. In 1818, Archbishop Gaisruck went to Milan as an archbishop, which meant that no pontifical trials had taken place until 1824 in Passau. Thun offered his resignation to the Holy See in 1819, but it was not accepted.
