= Hermann of Eppenstein =

Passau councillor from 1085 to 1087

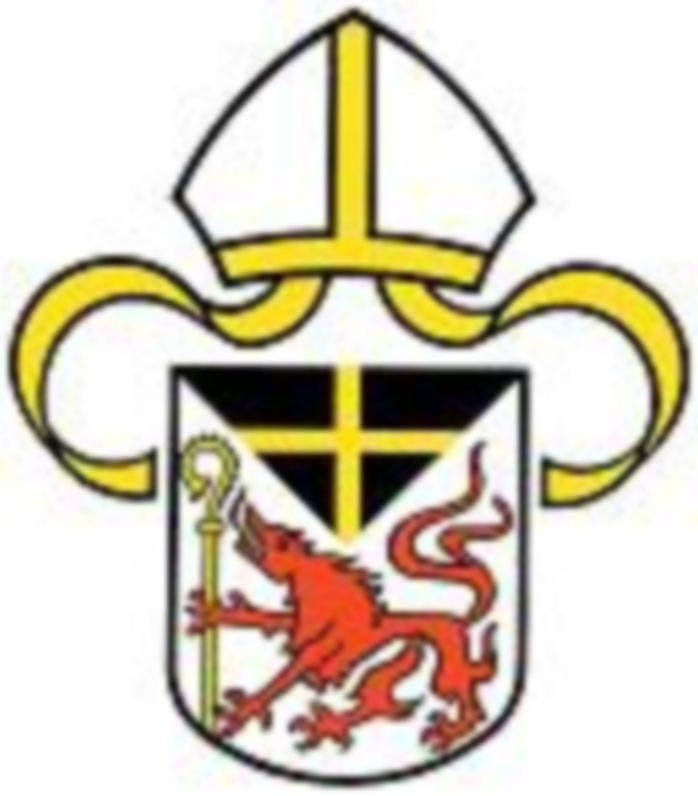
Bistumswappen of Passau.

Hermann von Eppenstein (* unknown; † 1087) was a Passau councilor from 1085 to 1087.

Hermann von Eppenstein, son of the Duke Markwards of Carinthia, came from an influential family. His first two brothers were Dukes of Carinthia, the third was abbot of St. Gallen, and later even Patriarch of Aquileia.

In April 1085, the Emperor Henry IV appointed him to the bishop of Mainz as a counter-bishop at the Synod of Mainz, declaring the papal faithful Altmann, the real Bishop of Passau. Altmann had to flee from Passau, where Hermann was received by his followers joyfully.

1086, a year later, Hermann was occupied by Archbishop Gebhard of Salzburg, by Bishop Altmann of Passau, and by Bishop Meginward of Freising with the church spokesman.

On his deathbed, Hermann was allegedly repent, and asked for the resignation of the church-bearer, since he regretted the repression of Altmann. According to this he was to have sent him the episcopal insignia. His followers believed in this behavior to recognize feverish fantasies.

As an anti-bishop, he is not led today by the Bishop of Passau as a former bishop.
