= Berengar (bishop of Passau) =

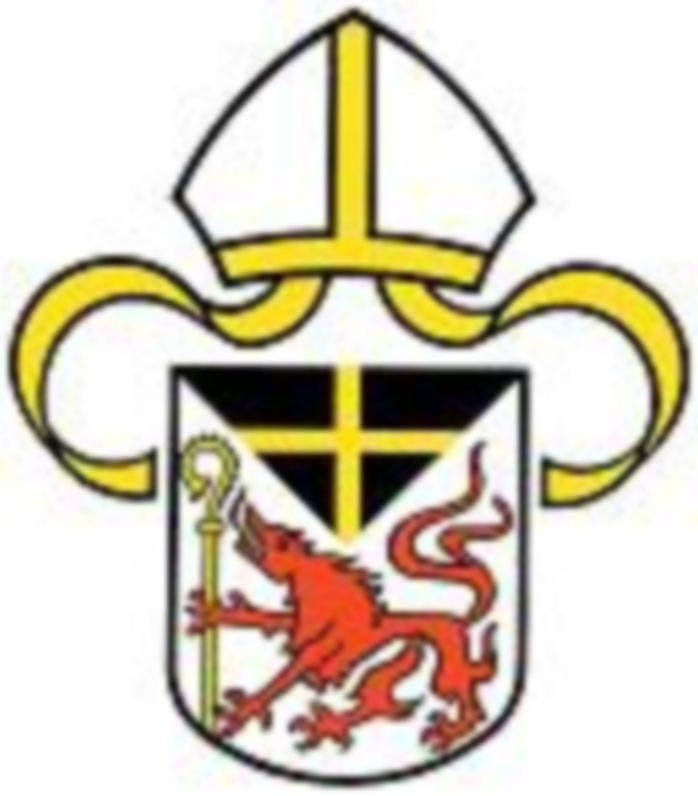
Bistumswappen of Passau.

Berengar of Passau (* in Passau, 14 July 1045 in Passau) was the Bishop of Passau from 1013 to 1045.

Berengar was the son of a wealthy citizen and probably one of the few Bishops of Passau born there. During Berengar's reign, the Hungarian Queen Gisela came to Passau to enter the Benedictine nunnery of Niedernburg, where she became an abbess. As a guest of Bishop Berengar in Passau, Emperor Henry IIImaintained close relations with the later Abbot Gotthard of Niederaltaich and the hermit Gunther.
