= Reginmar =

Reginmar (30 September 1138) was bishop in the diocese of Passau from 1121 to 1138.

Reginmar's origin is unknown. He promoted the monasteries and founded the abbeys at Aldersbach (1120), Asbach (1125), Ranshofen (1125), Klosterneuburg (1133), Heiligenkreuz (1134) and Altenmarkt (1138). At the same time, he extended the parish network of the diocese. It was only now that more and more clearly defined spheres were laid down with their own priest, with which the individual churches lost their importance.

Reginmar worked closely with Markgraf Leopold III Of Austria. In September 1135, the Margrave in Greifenstein renounced the tithes of 13 separate parishes in favor of the bishop. With his successor, Leopold IV, he concluded the exchange agreement of Mautern in 1137: the Vienna parish with the St. Peter's was handed over to the bishop by the Markgraf, the Markgraf received extensive lands around Vienna with the exception of a site outside the Stadtmauer, where a large new parish church was built From which later the Stephansdom hervorging.

The Annals of Melk Abbey and other monastic chronicles criticize Reginmar's secular lifestyle as well as his deprivation of world priests.
