= Otto of Lonsdorf =

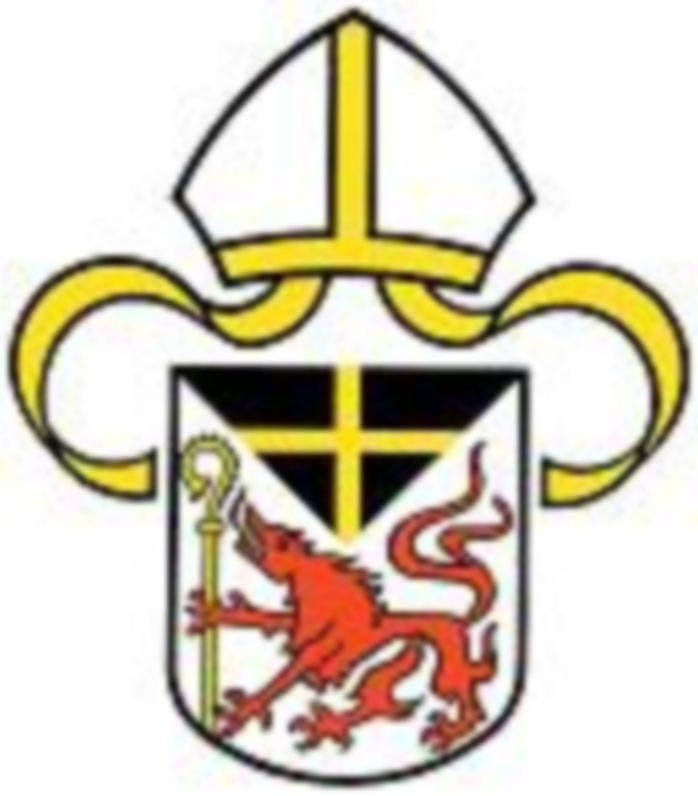
Bistumswappen of Passau.

Otto von Lonsdorf (ca.1200 – 1265) was a 13th-century Bishop of Passau.

== Life ==
He was probably educated at the Passau cathedral school. He was documented for the first time in 1240 as chaplain in the wake of Passau bishop Rudiger. In 1242, he was admitted to the cathedral chapter of Passau, before he became Bishop of Passau in 1254. His term in office saw the Treaty of Linz with King Ottokar II of Bohemia (1257), the coin reform of 1260, the reconciliation with Bavaria in 1262, and the "Ilzstadtweistum" in 1265 in the Stephansdom in Passau.

Otto von Lonsdorf is also well known for his cartulary "Codex Lonsdorfianus", which provides numerous important sources of mediaeval history even beyond the diocese (among other things, the Raffelstetten Customs Order of 903/905.

== Literature ==
- Josef Breinbauer: Otto von Lonsdorf. (Köln, 1992)
- Josef Breinbauer: Otto von Lonsdorf. In: Neue Deutsche Biographie (NDB). Band 19, (Duncker & Humblot, Berlin 1999), ISBN 3-428-00200-8, S. 691 (Digitalisat).
- Franz Xaver Kohler: Otto von Lonsdorf, Fürstbischof von Passau : (1254–1265). (Burghausen, 1902).
- Ulrich Schmid, Otto von Lonsdorf Bischof zu Passau. (Würzburg 1903).
