= Rüdiger of Bergheim =

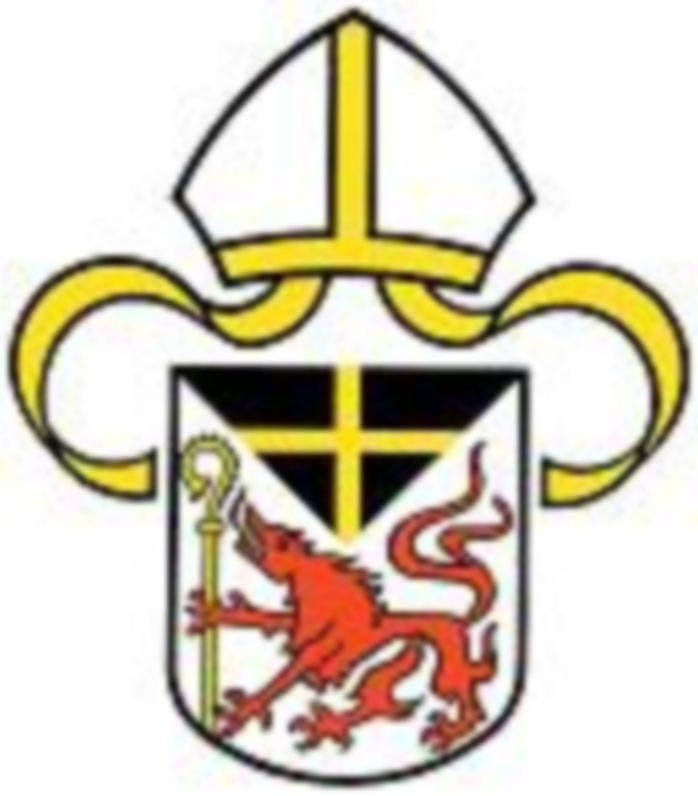
Coat of Arms of the diocese of Passau.

Rüdiger von Bergheim (c.1175 – 14 April 1258) was Bishop of Chiemsee from 1216 to 1233 and Bishop of Passau from 1233 to 1250. He was a constant vassal and active supporter of the Emperor Frederick II. He was deposed by the papal legate, Petrus de Collemedio, with confirmation by Pope Innocent IV.

== Biography ==
Rüdiger came from the Salzburg ministerial class of the Bergheimer. Since 1198 he had been a canon of Salzburg. From 1208 to 1211, he was a pastor of Salzburghofen, and until 1215 a provost of the Augustine Monastery Zell am See. In 1215 he became a canon of Passau.

=== Bishop of Chiemsee ===
In 1216 he was appointed the first bishop of the newly founded Diocese of Chiemsee, which was a suffragan bishop of Salzburg. The episcopal ordination, by the archbishop of Salzburg, Eberhard von Regensberg, took place at Chiemsee.

=== Bishop of Passau ===
After the resignation of Bishop Gebhard von Plaien on 10 October 1232, the diocese of Passau was vacant for a year, because the cathedral chapter of Passau could not agree on any candidate. Pope Gregory IX then sent a mandate on 27 June 1233 to the archbishop of Salzburg, the metropolitan of the diocese of Passau, to transfer the bishop of Chiemsee to Passau. The bishop of Chiemsee, Rüdiger von Bergheim, was advised by the pope, on 1 July 1233, not to postpone his move to Passau.

It is not known whether Rüdiger was able to reduce the debt assumed by his predecessor. Soon he fell into conflict with the Kurie, as he stood in the political disputes on the side of the Hohenstaufen. From 1234 to 1235, summoned by the emperor, he supported Frederick II in the struggle against his son Henry; and, from 1236 to 1239, he took part, with Otto of Bavaria, against Duke Frederick II "the warring" of Austria. Otto and Rudiger besieged the city of Linz, but failed. Duke Frederick captured Rudiger of Passau and Konrad of Freising, and held them in captivity for some time. During his captivity, the Archdeacon Albert usurped the powers and functions of the bishop. In 1237, Bishop Rudiger and the Canons of the cathedral unanimously deprived Albert of Beham, Dean of the cathedral, of his faculties and expelled him from Passau. Albert fled to Rome, but returned in 1238, with a papal decree against all the archbishops and bishops of Germany who were supporting Frederick II.

For that reason he was excommunicated in 1240 by the papal legate Albert Beham, who was a declared opponent of Frederick II. In consequence, the diocese had to accept the loss of Vilshofen as well as the Ortenburg fiefs. Otto II "the Illustrious", Duke of Bavaria, took the opportunity and undertook a foray into the region of Passau. After the imperial party collapsed in the southeast of the Reich in 1245, Rüdiger von Bergheim achieved the abolition of excommunication. After the extinction of the Babenbergs in 1246, whose efforts had always been rejected by the Diocese of Passau, he endeavored to expand his position as a sovereign.

=== Excommunication ===
Rüdiger von Bergheim was excommunicated in summer 1248, by the papal legate, Petrus de Collemedio, probably on the urging of Albert von Beham. In his place the Silesian Duke Konrad II was elected, but he was not confirmed by the pope. On 4 February 1249, Innocent IV refers to Rudiger as excommunicated and interdicted, but still bishop; he had dared to celebrate Mass and perform episcopal functions.

Early in 1249, Pope Innocent IV issued a mandate to the Vicedominus of Ratisbon, and the Franciscans Hermann de Bothenberunen and Henricus de Honkespeh, that they should inhibit the bishop of Passau from investing, selling, exchanging, or parcelling out any property belonging to the diocese of Passau. The two Franciscans were occupied in other business and unable to work with the Vicedominus, and thus the mandate was not carried out. On 15 February 1249, the pope authorized him to proceed alone according to the previous mandate, and to denounce as null and void any alienations attempted by the bishop. On the same day, the pope wrote to two abbots in Ratisbon, ordering them to prudently induce the bishop of Passau to resign his episcopate, though without loss of status, since he had seriously harmed the diocese with his negligence, inattention, and malevolence; and to accept the resignation on behalf of the pope. In a third document, issued on the same day, if the bishop should resign or die, the Chapter of the cathedral was inhibited from proceeding to the election, nomination, or request of some person, without special papal license.

=== Deposition ===
In the same year Pope Innocent IV repeated the excommunication of Rüdiger von Bergheim and demanded his resignation. Since Rüdiger was not ready to take this step, he was excommunicated once more by the papal legate, Petrus de Collemedio, Cardinal Bishop of Albano, on 17 February 1250, and deposed, being degraded from episcopal orders. On 11 March 1250 Pope Innocent IV confirmed the legate's actions. Subsequently, Rüdiger von Bergheim was expelled from his bishopric.

He lived for four years after his deposition. His place of death is not known.

== Sources ==
- Eubel, Conradus, ed. (1913). Hierarchia catholica (in Latin). Vol. 1 (Tomus I) (second ed.). Münster: Libreria Regensbergiana.. Archived
- Hansiz, Marcus. Germaniae sacræ: Metropolis Lauriacensis cum Episcopatu Pataviensi. (in Latin). Tomus I (1727). Augusta Vindelicorum (Augsburg): Happach & Schlüter.
- Höfler, Karl Adolf Constantin Ritter von (1847). Albert von Beham und Regesten Pabst Innocenz IV. (in German). Stuttgart: Literarischer Verein, 1847.
