= Burkhard (bishop of Passau) =

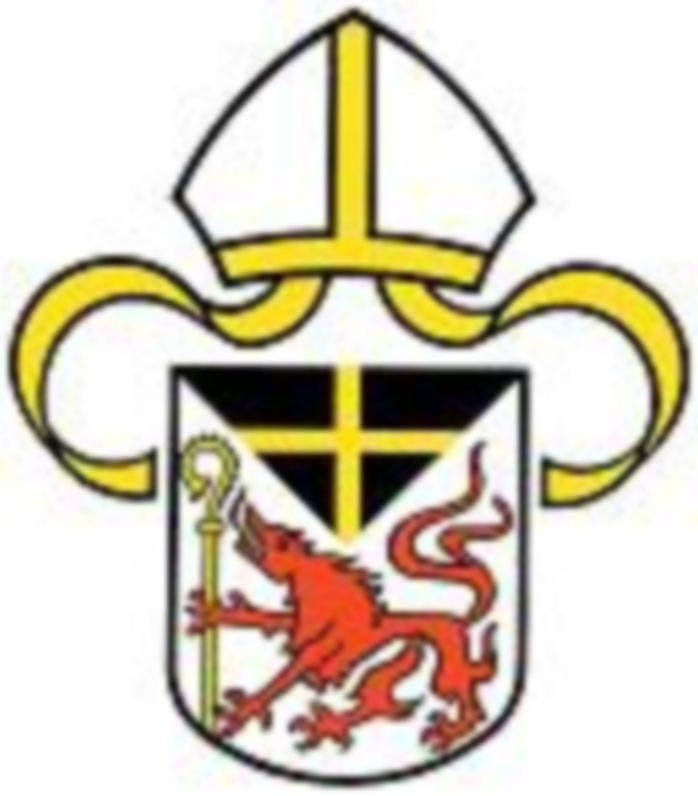
Coat of arms of the Bishop of Passau

Burkhard (died 915) was the 14th Bishop of Passau from 903 to his death in 915.

Burkhard was head of Altötting Abbey until 903, when he was elected bishop of Passau. In the same year he called a diocesan synod.

On 8 September 903, Burkhard reported the gift to the church of Passau of liturgical robes and some books of his chorbishop Madalwin. This is the earliest document of a bishop of Passau and is therefore considered the first deed of a bishop of Passau.

In 907 he supported the campaign of King Ludwig and Luitpold, Margrave of Bavaria, against the Hungarians. Burkhard accompanied the king to Enns. When they received the news of the defeat at the Battle of Pressburg (6 July 907) and the death of Luitpold, Burkhard fled with the king to Passau.

== Literature ==
- Egon Boshof: Die Regesten der Bischöfe von Passau. München 1992, pp. 49–52
- Alexander Erhard: Geschichte der Stadt Passau. Bd. 1, Passau 1862, pp. 49–52
- August Leidl: Die Bischöfe von Passau 739–1968 in Kurzbiographien. Passau 1978, p. 18
- Franz Mader: Tausend Passauer. Biographisches Lexikon zu Passaus Stadtgeschichte. p. 38
