= Ulrich I (bishop of Passau) =

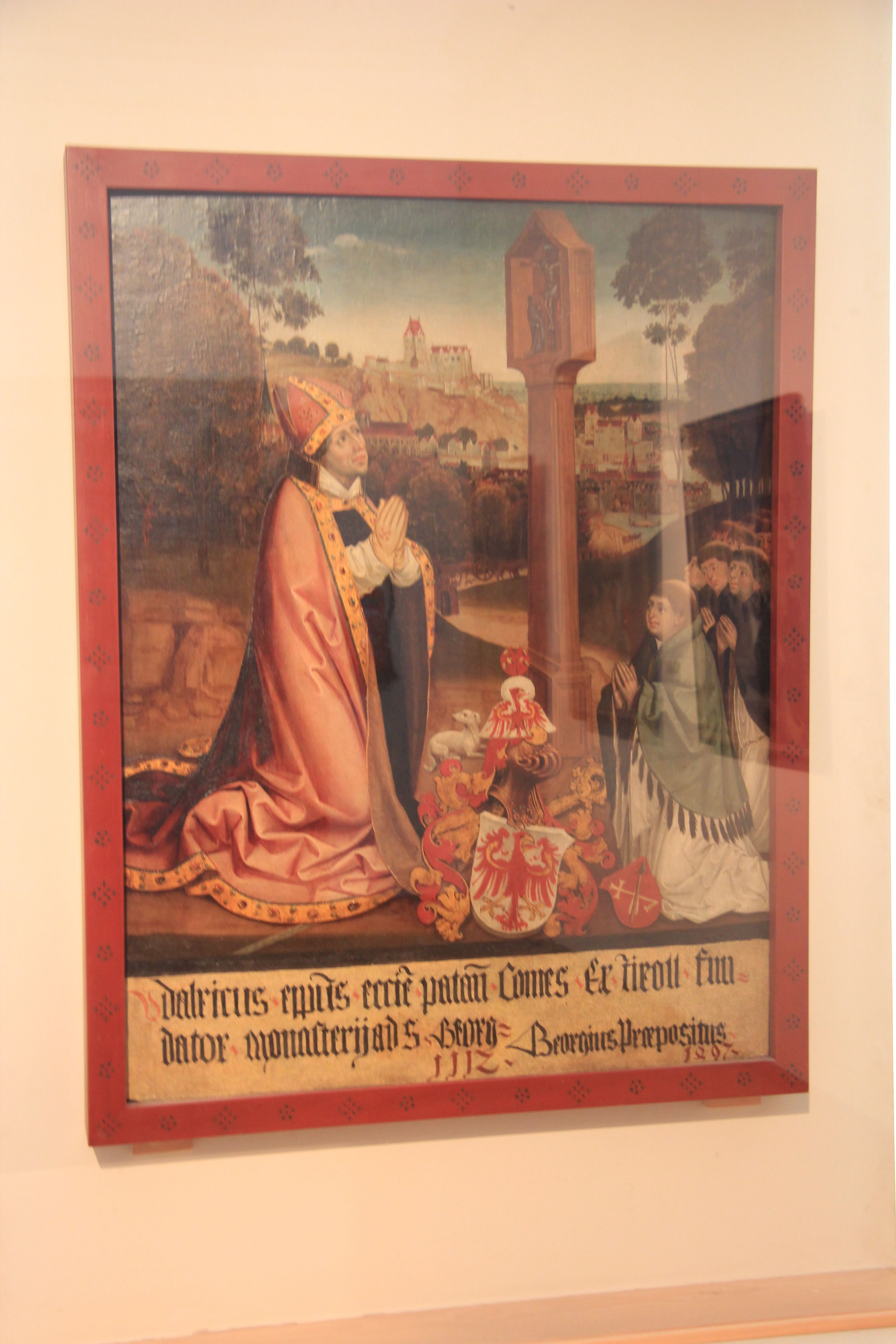
Portrait from Herzogenburg Monastery

Ulrich I of Passau, also called Udalrich (c. 1027 - 7 August 1121, Passau), was a monastery founder and bishop of the diocese of Passau.

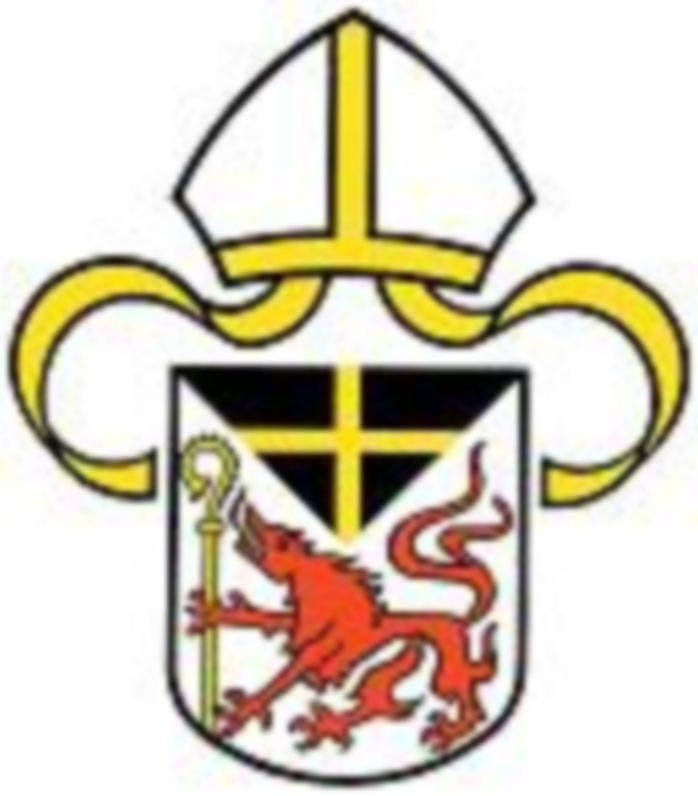
Coat of arms of the Diocese of Passau

== Life ==
It was earlier assumed that Ulrich I was from Tyrol. Later, his ancestry was plausibly attributed to a Swabian or Bavarian noble family. He was Dompropst of Augsburg Cathedral and was appointed Bishop of Passau in 1092, when he was about 65 years old. Since the antibishop Thiemo (who was appointed by Emperor Henry IV) was residing in Passau, Ulrich stayed in the east of the diocese, where he was protected by Babenberger Leopold II. However, from 1103 to 1105 he was forced to leave his diocese altogether and escaped to the Bavarian monastery of Rottenbuch.

In 1111, after he was able to return to his diocese, he reestablished the Abbey of St. Nikola, founded by Bishop Altmann of Passau. He donated his inheritance to Mertingen and to the Passau Cathedral in the year 1112. He founded the monastery of St. Georgen on the Traisen, which was later moved to Herzogenburg. He supported the foundation of Seitenstetten Abbey and converted the Garsten and Göttweig abbeys into Benedictine monasteries.
