= Joseph Francis of Weckert =

Joseph Franz of Weckert (12 September 1822 in Wallerstein, 13 March 1889 in Passau) was 76th Bishop of Passau.

== Life ==
He was the son of the brewer-defender Franz Alban Weckert and his wife Maria Bosch. He graduated from the Gymnasium in Dillingen on the Danube in 1839. Afterwards, he studied philosophy at the Lyceum there, and since 1841 in Munich, he first studied the rights, then theology. In 1843 he entered the Dillinger clerical seminar.

Weckert was ordained a priest on 2 April 1845. He then worked as a chaplain in Kleinerdingen near Nördlingen and in Augsburg / St. Ulrich. In 1848 he became a vicar and secretary of Bishop Richarz. He also exercised these offices under his successors. King Ludwig II nominated him Bishop of Passau on 4 October 1875; the papal appointment was made on 28 January 1876. On 30 April 1876 he was consecrated in Passau by Archbishop Gregor von Scherr as bishop. With the awarding of the Order of Merit of the Bavarian Crown, he was elevated to Bavarian personal knighthood.

The ecclesiastical authority exercised by his predecessor, Heinrich von Hofstatter, and the strictness in the education of priestly growth, were considerably weakened by him. Because of illness, Weckert had little contact with the citizens or his own clergy, because he could not conduct a single visitation and only a few confirmations. He died on 13 March 1889 and was buried in the cathedral before the Pauline conversion age. A simple monument remains on the wall next to the altar. It is also named after him, the Bischof-Weckert-Strasse in Wallerstein.
