= Gottfried (bishop of Passau) =

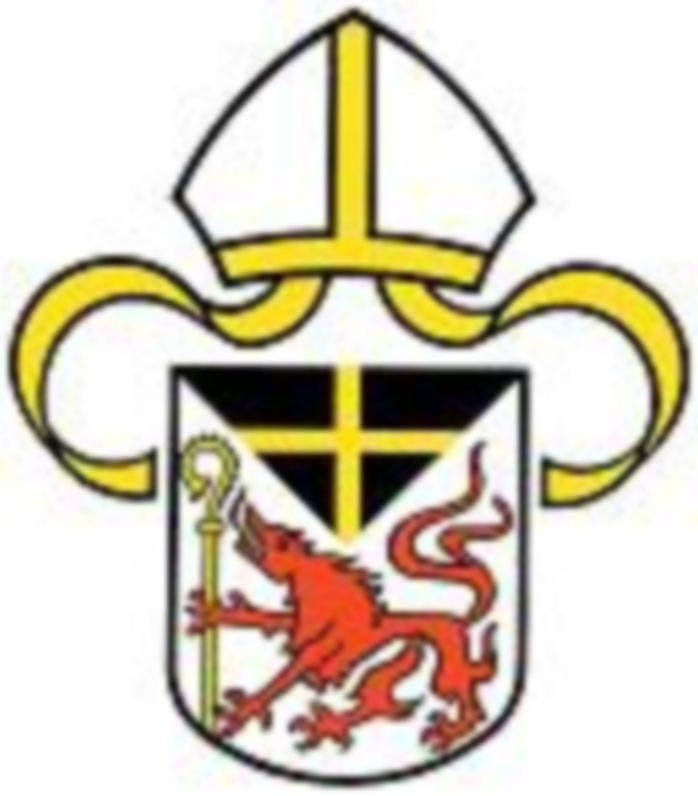
Bistumswappen of Passau.

Gottfried von Passau also Gottfried I ( - 16 April 1285 in Nuremberg) was the 41st bishop of Passau from 1283 to 1285.

== Life and work ==
The Westphalian, probably from Osnabrück, was prothonotary for King Rudolf of Habsburg. Following his proposal, the Passau cathedral chapter chose Gottfried to be the bishop on 11 February. The consecration took place on 7 March 1283 in Salzburg. Together with Heinrich, bishop of Regensburg, he was successful as an intermediary in a dispute between Duke Albert of Austria and Duke Henry XIII. In March 1284 Gottfried organized a synod in St. Pölten, where important resolutions were adopted to promote the clergy. In addition, he managed to organize the finances of the Passau diocese. He dedicated the choir of the St. Florian church to the cross altar to the west of the nave with the high altar and the two altars in the sides of the side ships.

In the Bavarian State Archives there is a certificate recording the birth of the 5th season of the town fair (Carnival). Bishop Gottfried confirms the "festival" in 1283 for the clothmaker's trade - it included a feast, the last which may be celebrated before the fasting season of lent begins on Ash Wednesday.

His bones are located in the bishop's tomb of Passau's cathedral.
