= Reginbert of Hagenau =

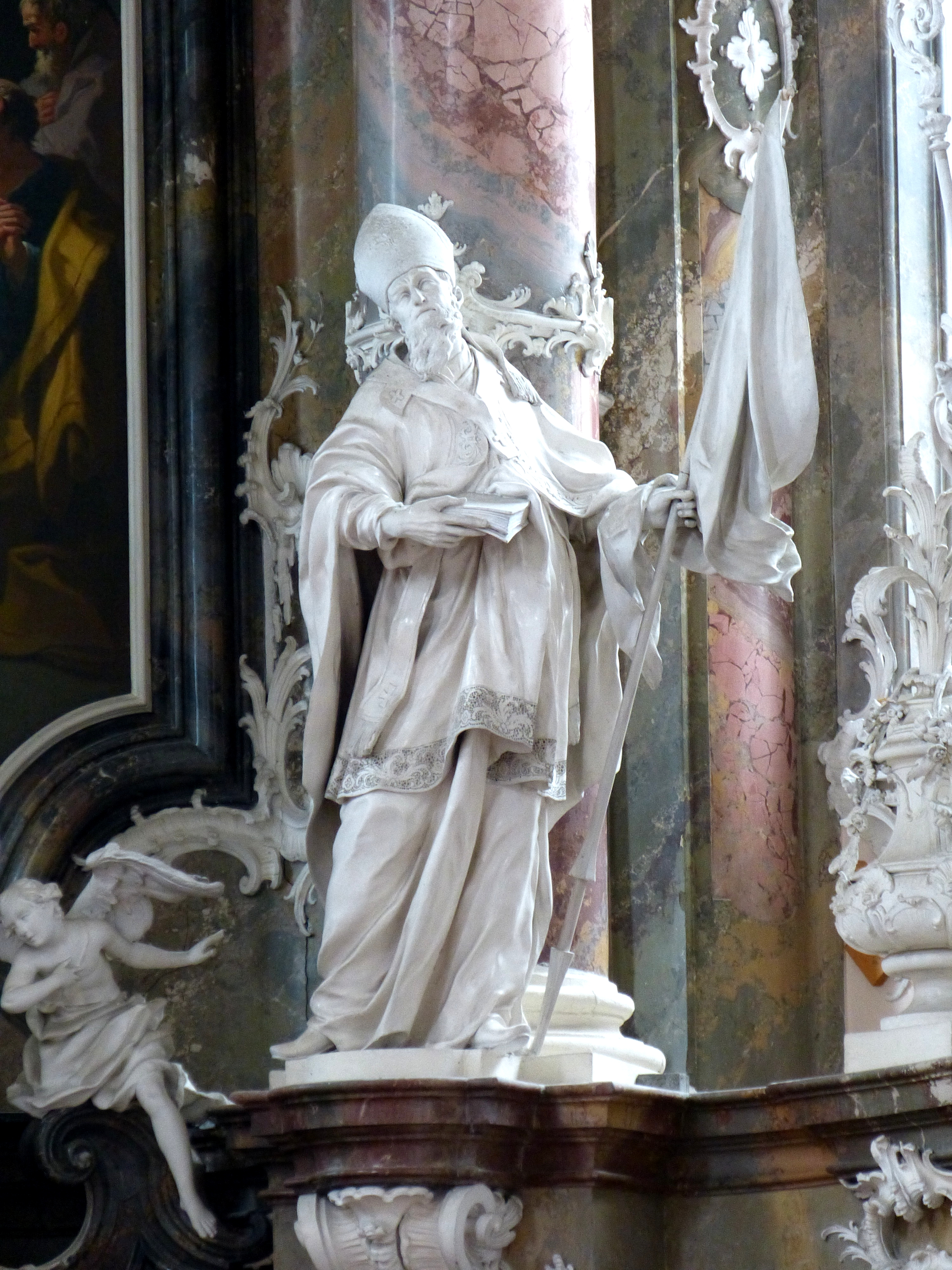
Reginbert.

Reginbert of Hagenau also called Raimbert (10 November 1148) was 1130 provost of the Stift St. Pölten and in 1138 bishop of Passau.

== Family ==
At 1130 at the latest, Reginbert was the abbot of the St. Pölten Abbey. As a prophet of St. Pölten, he had the epitaph of his parents (the co-founders of Seitenstetten) built into the Stiftskirche Seitenstetten (St. Pölten) from the family shrine of the branch church of St. Peter am Anger.

Reginbert stemmed from the Austrian Hagenau noble family. His father was Reimprecht (also Reginbert I) of Hagenau, the co-founder of Seitenstetten. Reginbert had an older brother Werinhart and a younger named Hartwig, as well as a younger sister, Richarde, who joined the Familienstiftung Seitenstetten as a nun. Reginbert, however, is expressly mentioned in documents as one of the family of the Counts of Peylnstein and Playen (Plain), from which a clan relationship between the Plainer and Hagenauer can be deduced. After Bishop Reginmar died on 30 November 1138, Reginbert was elected as his successor as Bishop of Passau. In April or May 1139, he was consecrated by Pope Innocent II as a priest and a bishop. That a priest ordination was necessary at this time indicates that he was only a deacon before then.

== Career ==
During his administration, he closely linked his family, especially his brother Hartwig, to the episcopal policy. In the conflict between Welfen and Staufern, he behaved pro-stubbornly. In 1139, against the will or without the participation of the Stiftskanoniker, he handed over to a candidate of his choice the proclamation of the Reichsstiftes Ranshofen. However, according to a mandate of the Pope, Innocent II, Reginbert had to grant the convent a free, canonical election, from which Manegold emerged. The years 1139 to 1144 were characterized by an argument with the monastery Reichersberg: Proclamation against Pope Innocent II against the tenths of the Passau bishop. On the basis of the resolutions of the Synod of Pisa in 1135, according to which clergymen, who by their own hand and with their own resources, were engaged in goods, were not obliged to pay ten, the pope forbade the demands of Reginbert. He ignored the mandate three times. Only when Pope Lucius II undertook more energetic steps did Reginbert intervene, escaping presumably from his excommunication. In 1140 Reginbert took part in the Reichstag in Frankfurt. He is responsible for the construction of a hospital and around 1143 the construction of the first bridge with the defensive gate at the residence in Passau. For the failure of the ferry, the penitent St. Nikola was compensated by the donation of the church to Hartkirchen. Under Reginbert's leadership the monasteries of Zwettl, Baumgartenberg, Suben, Altenburg and Waldhausen were founded. In 1146 he appointed his brother Hartwig to the post of the hospital in Vöcklabruck.

As a loyal follower of the Staufer, he accompanied Konrad III On the Second Crusade. He broke up with his contingent in 1147 to join the army of Konrad in Regensburg. On the way out, Reginbert consecrated the Stephanskirche in Vienna in the same year, the predecessor of St. Stephan's cathedral (patronate after the mother church Passau). On the return journey from Palestine through the Byzantine Empire he fell ill and died there on 10 November 1148.

Reginbert had previously convinced his childless brother Hartwig von Hagenau, before he went with him to the Second Crusade, to make a will in favor of the Passau diocese. In fact, Hartwig was also on the crusade and there was a dispute over Hartwig's abandoned estates between the third brother Werinhardt von Hagenau and his sons and Hartwig's widow. The Archbishopric of Passau also reported his claims. Henry II, Duke of Austria held a hoftag and decided in favor of the now bishop Konrad I of Passau, which in 1150 received the Lehenhagenau near Braunau. The brother of Hartwig and his sons were rewarded.
