= Valentine of Passau =

Monk and abbot venerated in the Catholic Church

Saint Valentine of Passau
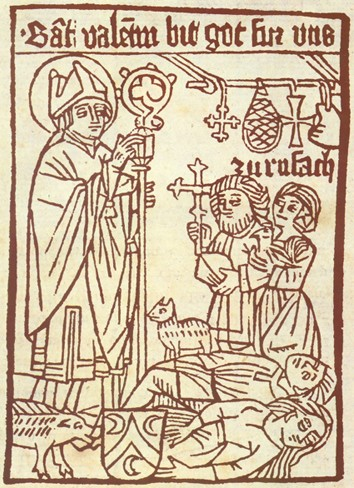
- Valentine of Passau

Bishop, Missionary, Venerable
- Died: 7 January 475
- Venerated in: Eastern Orthodox Church; Roman Catholic Church
- Feast: 7 January
- Attributes: bishop preaching to pagans
- Patronage: convulsions, cramps, epilepsy

Valentine of Passau (died 7 January 475) was a bishop, abbot, monk, and hermit, who is venerated as a saint in Eastern Orthodoxy and Roman Catholicism.

== Biography ==
He was a papal missionary bishop to Rhaetia (present-day Switzerland, Bavaria, Tyrol, and South Tyrol); and among the first patrons of Passau. He finally lived as a hermit in Zenoburg, Merano, South Tyrol, northern Italy.

== Sources ==
- Nirschl, Joseph (1889). Der heilige Valentin, erster Bischof von Passau und Rhätien: eine historisch-kritische Untersuchung aus dem kirchenhistorischen Seminar der Universität Würzburg. (in German). Mainz: Kirchheim, 1889.
