= Anthelm (bishop of Passau) =

Medieval bishop

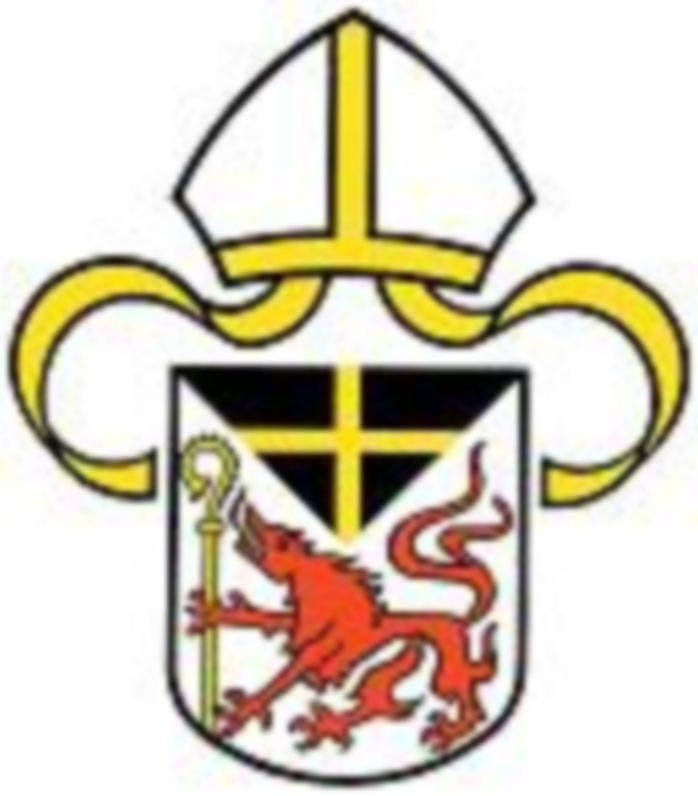
Bistumswappen of Passau.

Anthelm (fl. 763–770) was the 4th Bishop of Passau from 763–764 to 764–770. His existence is verifiable. The exact dates of his reign are unknown. It is probable that during his office (or his successor's), the bones of St. Valentin were bought from Trent to Passau.
