= Cultural depictions of Otto the Great =

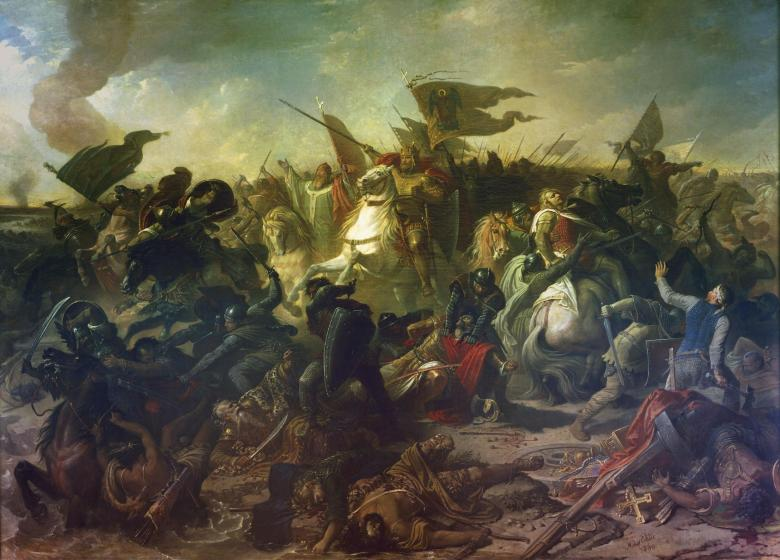
Battle of Lechtfeld (955) by Michael Echter, 1860.

Otto I, also called Otto the Great, is seen by many as one of the greatest medieval rulers. His name is usually associated with the foundation (or consolidation of the Holy Roman Empire, depending on the sources, although the modern vỉew generally considers Otto, rather than his father Henry the Fowler or Charlemagne, as the founder), the victory in the Battle of Lechfeld gained him, according to historian Jim Bradburn, a reputation as the great champion of Christendom, and the Ottonian Renaissance. Although historians in different eras have never denied his reputation as a successful ruler, the image of the nationalist political strongman which was usually perceived during the nineteenth century has been questioned by more recent sources. Modern historians explore the emperor's capability as a consensus builder, as well as the participation of princes in contemporary politics and the important roles played by female actors (notably his wives Eadgyth and Adelaide of Italy) and his advisors in his endeavors. Mentioned also is that Otto did have a strong character. Oft mentioned is Otto's strong character, which led to multiple unsuccessful rebellions.

== Historiography ==
=== Politics and the Imperial Church system ===
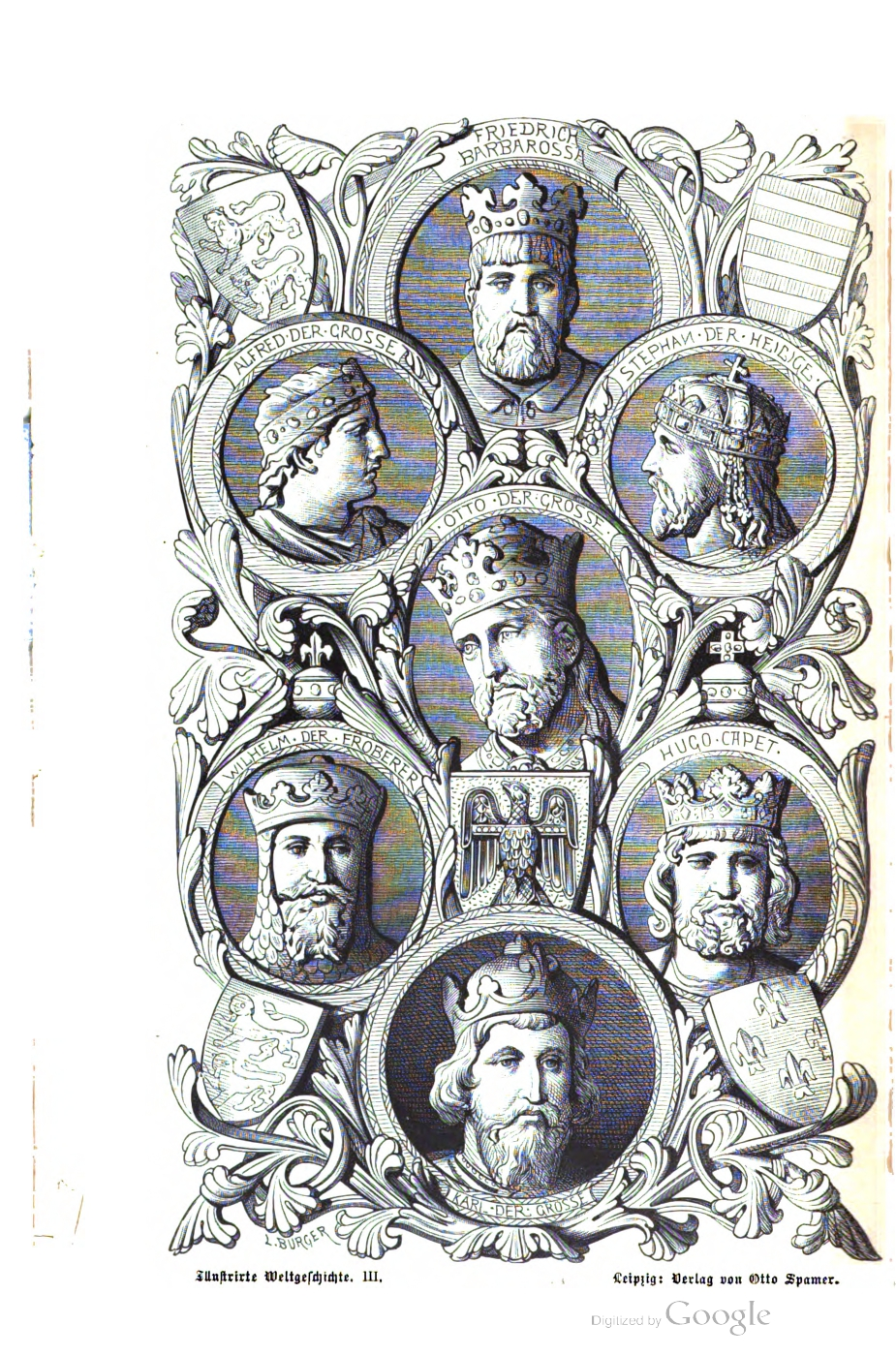
Medieval rulers from Illustrierte Weltgeschichte für das Volk: Geschichte des Mittelalters (1882) by Otto von Corvin: Otto the Great as the central figure, Frederick Barbarossa (top center), Alfred the Great (upper left), King Saint Stephen (upper right), William the Conqueror (lower left), Hugh Capet (lower right), Charlemagne (lower center). Artist: Ludwig Burger (1825–1884).

Kurt Reindel comments on the legacy of Otto as the following:

Otto I’s achievement rests mainly on his consolidation of the Reich. He deliberately made use of the bishops to strengthen his rule and thus created that “Ottonian church system of the Reich” that was to provide a stable and long-lasting framework for Germany. By his victorious campaigns, he gave Germany peace and security from foreign attack, and the preeminent position that he won as ruler gave him a sort of hegemony in Europe. His Italian policy and the acquisition of the imperial crown constituted a link with the old Carolingian tradition and was to prove a great responsibility for the German people in the future. All areas under Otto’s rule prospered, and the resultant flowering of culture has been called the Ottonian renaissance.

In the nineteenth century, Otto the Great was often considered a leader who brought the Germans the first place among European people. In his and R. Köpke's 1876 Kaiser Otto der Grosse, Ernst Dümmler, "the author of the most detailed description of Otto's government to date", described a "youthful upswing, a national trend went through the hearts of the people under Emperor Otto [...]" Writing in 1926, Robert Holtzmann continued this sentiment, praising Otto as the ruler who "showed the way and goal of Medieval German history, and not only initiated the German imperial period, but truly dominated it for centuries to come."

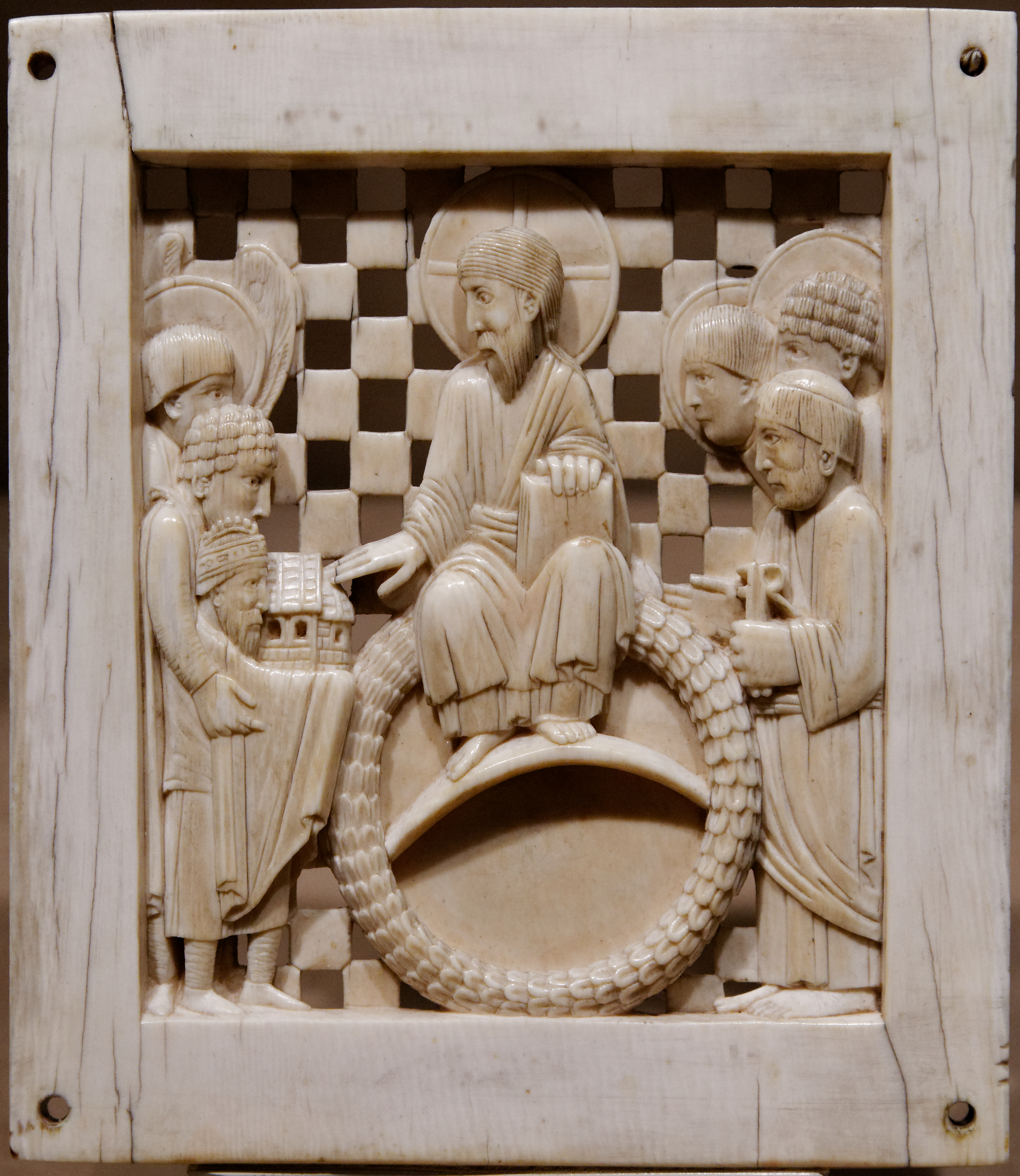
Plaque with Christ receiving Magdeburg Cathedral from Emperor Otto I. Between 962 and 968. MET 41.100.157

In the recent decades, scholars had revised certain important concepts about medieval politics, not only concerning Germany but also Western and Central Europe in general. Beginning with Gerd Althoff and Hagen Keller's 1985 work on Henry the Fowler and Otto I, royal or imperial rulership has been seen as a phenomenon that happened both above and in the conflicts between magnates. The princes were partners in policy formulating processes and the monarch's position could only develop gradually. This was by no means a continuous process with clear patterns. In this form of rulership, called "consensual rulership" by Bernd Schneidmüller (konsensuale Herrschaft), consultations and assemblies were important for building consensus, although absolute consensus was not needed and consensus could also be enforced by might, but the monarches could not always coerce and likely had no desire to rule absolutely without consent. The consensus through which the monarch cooperated with the princes would become disturbed in the Salian period. This does not mean that Otto was not a strong-willed ruler or just a mediator. By contrast, as Laudage writes, even as a young ruler, Otto "consciously accomplished a break in continuity and set himself apart from his father by more strongly emphasizing his decision-making power and authority". (Note: […] denn der junge Herrscher hat auch bewußt einen Kontinuitätsbruch vollzogen und sich durch stärkere Akzentuierung seiner Entscheidungsvollmacht und Autorität von seinem Vater absetzen […]) Partly inheriting conflicts with the nobles from his father's reign, partly creating such conflicts himself by vigorously defending his rights to allocate offices and intervening in the nobility's power structure, in the end, he emerged victorious from those conflicts (the most serious came from his own family).

Christian Hillen compares Johannes Laudage's Otto der Große (912-973). Eine Biographie (2001) with Gerd Althoff's Otto III. and notes that both reserve special focus for the role of "staged and symbolic actions, gestures and other non-verbal forms of communication"; both note that the rulers' politics were more improvised than planned (this also reflects on the nature of medieval politics in general): "It was not through long-term plans that dominance was achieved, but a long chain of instantaneous decisions." (Note: "Nicht in langfristig geplanten Konzepten, sondern in einer langen Kette von Augenblicksentscheidungen verwirklichte sich die Herrschaft.")

Althoff writes the following on Otto I:

Purposefulness, resoluteness and success characterize Otto's reign. Dealing with the conflicting interests of royalty, nobility and church, he defended the royal decision-making prerogatives against aristocratic interests, particularly during the early stages of his reign. However, he also showed flexibility, as shown by the recognition of dynastic succession, which enabled continuity in the ruling entities (Herrschaftsbildung) of the nobility. He supported the imperial churches and their leading representatives in many ways, but also tied them intensively to imperial service. He is regarded as the founder of the Ottonian-Salian "imperial church system", which, however, should not be misunderstood to mean that the church was used as a compliant instrument for the monarchy and against the nobility. For this ruler of the tenth century, consensus-building was an indispensable prerequisite for governance. To do this, he had to integrate different groups and interests, reward outcomes and merits appropriately, and honor his loyal followers. Power politics and asserting one's own interests, on the other hand, were in essence not what was expected of a ruler at that time. From this perspective, many of the difficulties that Otto faced can be explained, like the temporary successes of his various opponents as well as the positive evaluations they received from many contemporaries. However, his contemporaries and posterity have always acknowledged that he went his own way unwaveringly and ultimately successfully. The nickname 'the Great' was already given to him by his contemporaries.

Becher opines that describing Otto as the great leader who found the German Empire or a pioneer of (Western) Europe against "the East" would be misleading, because Otto and his contemporaries did not think in such terms (Becher also considers the epithet "the Great" as usually applied to notable leaders a problematic term on its own.). In Becher's opinion, there were five areas Otto achieved lasting contributions to the Empire he ruled: "his work in combatting the rebellions directed against himself, his policy towards the West Frankish Empire, his victory over the Hungarians on the Lechfeld, the mission to the areas up to the Oder and the imperial coronation". Becher emphasizes that, he did not complete these achievements alone: "Otto [...] certainly always coordinated his actions with a group of advisers headed by his wives Eadgyth and Adelheid and he continuously depended on the support of as many influential people as possible." Wozniak opines that Becher's work is a suitable introduction to Otto, that is not overloaded with too many details, but notes that the influence of female characters are not shown enough.

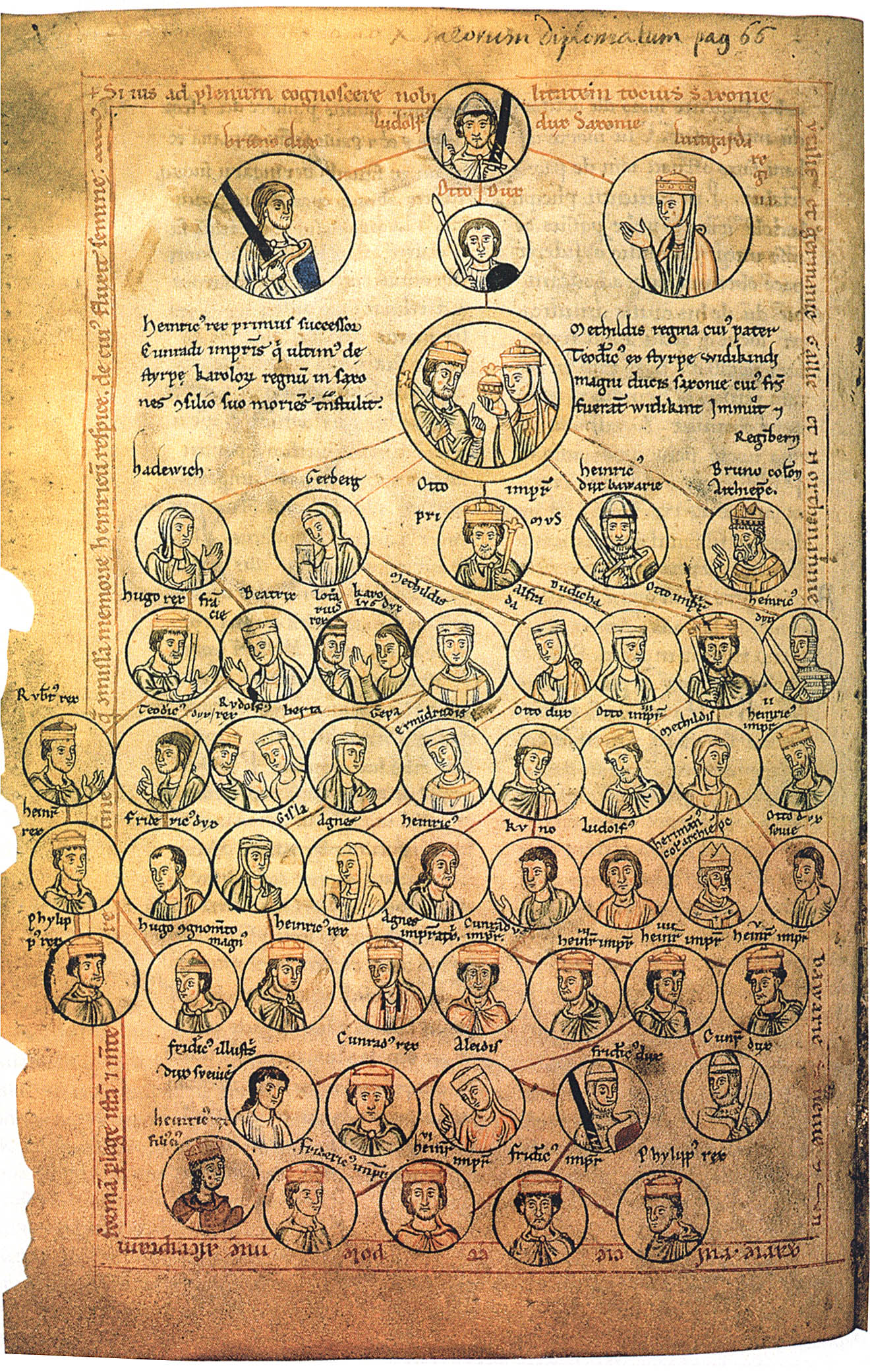
Genealogy of the Ottonians with Heinricus rex and Methildis regina in the double circle (Chronica St. Pantaleonis, 2nd half of 12th century. Herzog August Bibliothek, Wolfenbüttel, Cod. Guelf. 74.3 Aug., pag. 226)

While he claimed the ideal of the universal empire that Charlemagne once represented, traditional and modern historians have noted the practical aspect of his intervention in Italy, which on some level was a reaction to the Pope's interference with ecclesiastic princes in Germany, and his program of tying the Church firmly to his government. The intervention in Italy tied the fates of Germany and Italy. Later, German rulers, notably his grandson Otto III (who was considered more idealistic and less practical than his grandfather), would be criticized by nineteenth century historians for weakening Germany's own nationality in favour of the universal ideal and their role as protectors of Italy.

Brian Downing opines that societies in Western Europe remained decentralized throughout the Middle Ages and Otto was no more successful than Charlemagne in ensuring aristocratic fealty in the long term. Although the Ottonians and their Salic and Hohenstaufen successors built their systems of local officials, the vassals in response created their own ministeriales. But Otto made a good arrangement by incorporating the resources of the church system, that provided administrative skills and wealth. This arrangement worked until the Church's ambition to develop its own corporate structure clashed with the secular rulers. However, the decentralized nature of societies would foster democracy in the long run.

=== Military affairs ===
Otto's military ability has been discussed quite frequently. Writing in 1982, Karl Leyser noted that there were dispute, but on the level of combining the military and the political in exploiting his victories. it was indisputable that his vision did not fall short of a Clausewitz. Recent works generally see his generalship in a positive light. Franke notes that the hallmark of his generalship was his ability to conduct multiple campaigns on multiple fronts in one year, although his rule began with minor defeat against the Bohemians, and his Italian campaigns were not as successful as campaigns in the north. Up until Lechfeld, he faced repeated trouble in ensuring cooperation from the aristocrats with his chosen commanders. Kohler notes that he had an ability to turn weakness into strength, was cool and calm and knew how to inspire his troops in the face of difficulty, was merciful when dealing with internal rebels but totally ruthless to foreign opponents. The year of 955 was the foremost example. Facing enemies on two fronts, he was able to destroy the Hungarians before return to deal with the Slavs.

David Bachrach notes that Henry I (the Fowler) and Otto the Great achieved the remarkable feat of waging war across the whole of Europe, from the Oder to the Seine and from the Baltic Sea to the Adriatic and Mediterranean, recreating Charlemagne's empire and establishing themselves as hegemons of Western Europe. on the back of a well-built administration system inherited from the Carolingians and ultimately the Ancient Romans (and expanded by the Ottonian themselves), which was able to mobilize resources for very large armies (as shown by archaeological excavations) and successful conduct of operations. In combination with extensive diplomatic activities, this allowed the Ottonian rulers to succeed.

=== Cultural patronage ===
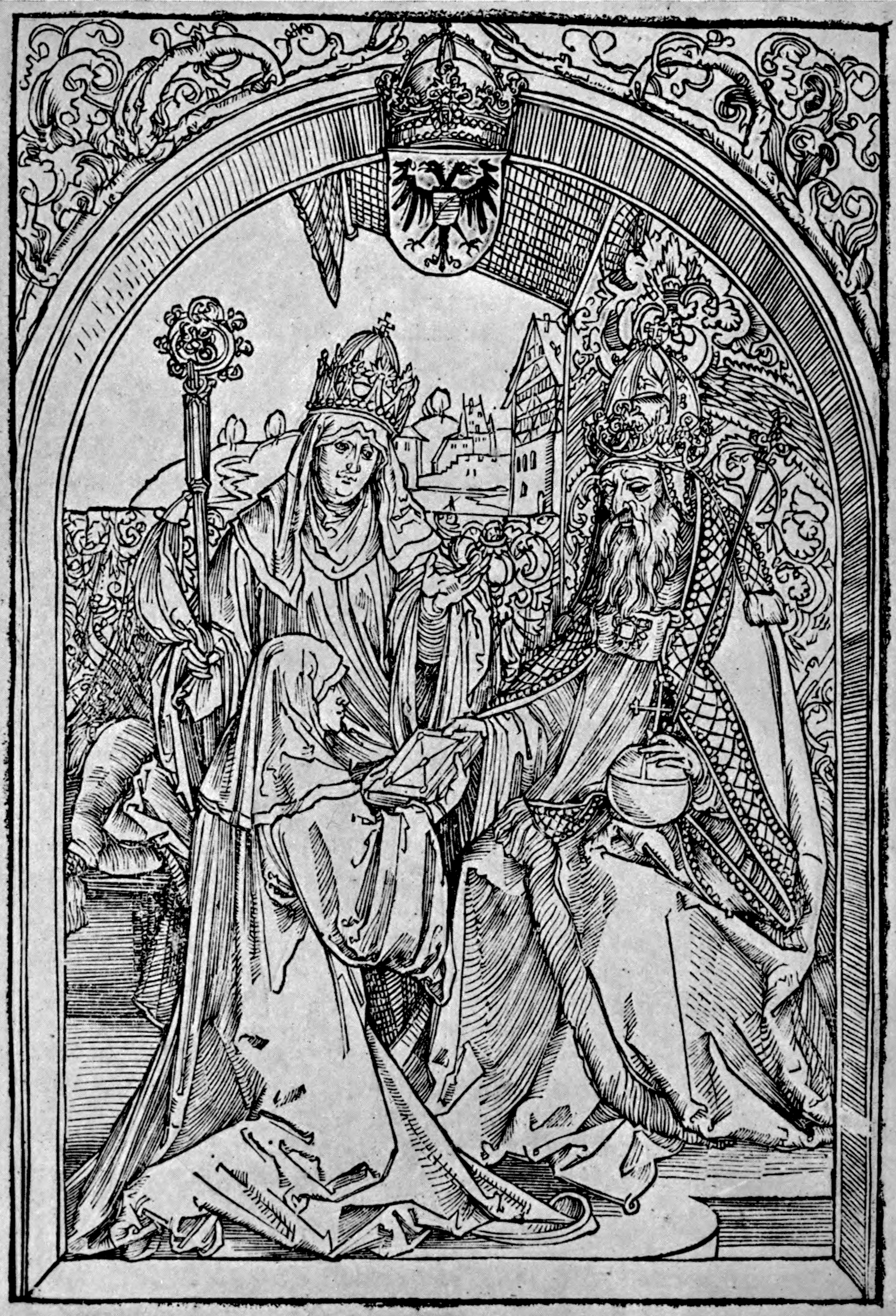
Albrecht Dürer's illustration for Opera Hrosvite, illustris virginis et monialis Germane, gente Saxonica orte, nuper a Conrado Celte inventa, edited by Konrad Celtis.

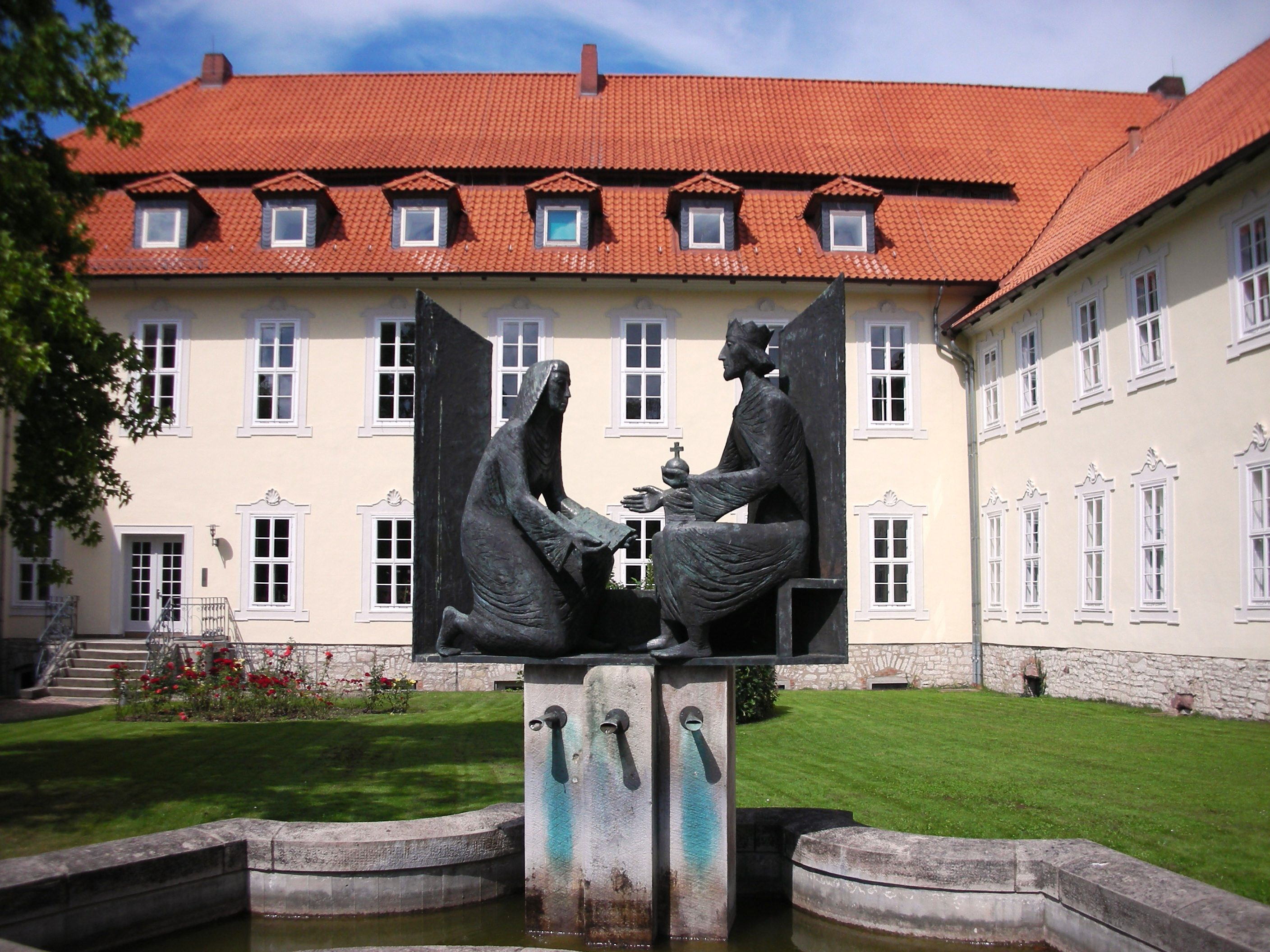
The Roswitha Fountain (Roswitha-Brunnen) in Gandersheim, erected by Siegfried Zimmermann in 1978, is a modern rendition.

The scene of Hrosvitha presenting her work to Otto (not recorded in historical accounts)

Unlike his heirs, Otto only learned to read at age thirty. It was under his reign that Ottonian architecture was first developed. Blending Mediterranean, Byzantine and Christian influence with Germanic elements, it was an innovative style reflecting the high regards the Ottonian architects had for mathematical sciences. There was no centre of cultural or literary patronage yet, but learning was encouraged and scholars and artists were summoned by the court from Italy or Constantinople.

According to Ullmann, "The Saxon dynasty, established by Henry I in 919, during the reign of his son, Otto the Great (936–973), had rapidly become the leading European power, territorially, militarily, economically, and also to some extent culturally."

- Althoff, Gerd (1985). Heinrich I. und Otto der Grosse: Neubeginn auf karolingischem Erbe (in German). Muster-Schmidt. ISBN 978-3-7881-0122-0.
- Althoff, Gerd (1985). Heinrich I. und Otto der Grosse : Neubeginn auf karolingischem Erbe. Göttingen: Muster-Schmidt. ISBN 9783788101220.
- Gerd Althoff (1999). "Otto I., der Große". Neue Deutsche Biographie (in German). Vol. 19. Berlin: Duncker & Humblot. pp. 656–660. (full text online).
- Becher, Matthias (2012). Otto der Grosse: Kaiser und Reich : eine Biographie (in German). C.H.Beck. ISBN 978-3-406-63061-3.

(Review by Thomas Wozniak)

- Reindel, Kurt (19 November 2021). "Otto I - Legacy Britannica". www.britannica.com.
- Köpke, Rudolf and Dümmler, Ernst: Kaiser Otto der Große. Darmstadt 1962, Nachdruck der 1. Auflage, Leipzig 1876.
- Köpke, Rudolf (29 September 2013). Kaiser Otto der Große (in German). DOGMA. ISBN 978-3-95580-848-8.
- Laudage, Johannes (2001). Otto der Grosse (912-973): eine Biographie (in German). WBG. ISBN 978-3-7917-1750-0.

(Review by Christian Hillen)

- Salewsky, Dietmar (2019). Otto I. : Leben und Wirken im Spiegel der Quellen. Darmstadt. ISBN 9783534403301.
- Schneidmüller, Bernd; Weinfurter, Stefan (2003). Die deutschen Herrscher des Mittelalters: historische Portraits von Heinrich I. bis Maximilian I. (919-1519) (in German). C.H.Beck. ISBN 978-3-406-50958-2.
- Schneidmüller, Bernd (2000). "Konsensuale Herrschaft. Ein Essay über Formen und Konzepte politischer Ordnung im Mittelalter". In Paul-Joachim Heinig; Sigrid Jahns; Hans-Joachim Schmidt; Rainer Christoph Schwinges; Sabine Wefers (eds.). Reich, Regionen und Europa in Mittelalter und Neuzeit. Festschrift für Peter Moraw (= Historische Forschungen. Bd. 67). Berlin: Duncker & Humblot. pp. 53–87. doi:10.11588/heidok.00012062.

== Legends and anecdotes ==
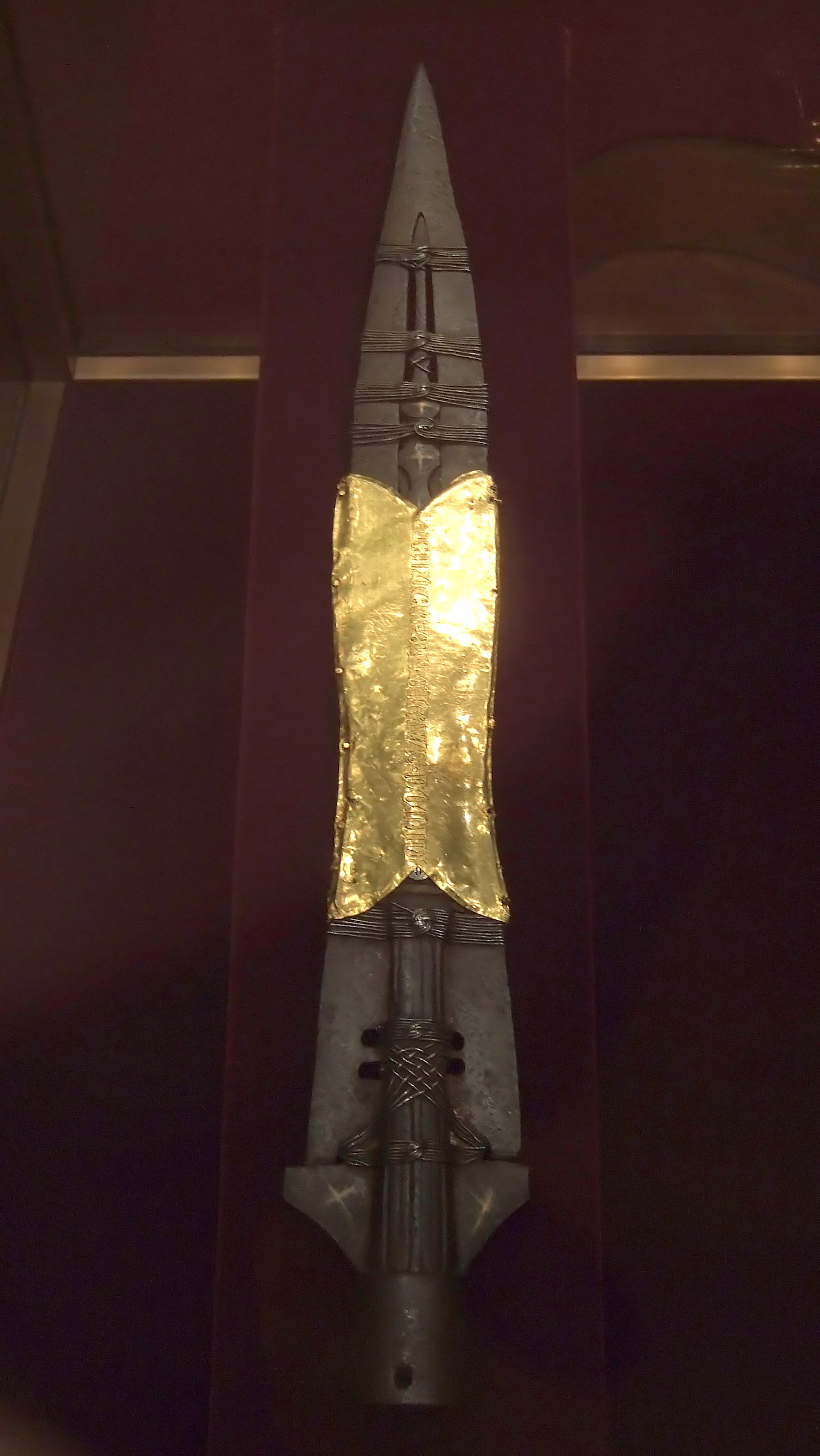
The Holy Lance in Vienna

- Otto and the Battle of Lechfeld associated with the legendary Holy Lance, also called the Hofburg spear. Metallurgical investigation by the Montanuniversität Leoben in 1914 showed that the Holy Lance could not have been manufactured before the eighth century AD. At the Court Diet of Worms in 926, King Henry I acquired the Holy Lance from the Burgundian King Rudolf II, who had received it in 922 from Count Samson along with the rulership of Italy, in exchange for the south-west corner of East Francia (the city of Basel). The legend soon grew that Henry I owed his victory over the dreaded Hungarian army in the Battle of Riade on the Unstrut in 933 solely to the use of the Holy Lance. The lance is also said to have been used at the Battle of Birten in 939, in which Otto I prevailed against opponents within the empire, and in the Battle of Lechfeld in 955, in which the Hungarians were finally defeated by King Otto I. However, work by scientists from the University of Vienna did not reveal any typical signs of battle on the tip of the lance. Trevor Ravenscroft recounts that he was its first possessor, and that a previous Holy Spear that belonged to Henry the Fowler had mysteriously disappeared before Otto came to possession of it.
- The Rammelsberg legend or Gose legend: According to Gose: Brewing a Classic German Beer for the Modern Era, the Rammelsberg silver mine was found in 970: "Legend has it that during the rule of the Saxon Emperor, Otto the Great, a hunting party, led by his most favored hunter Ramm, was tracking a deer through theforest in the foothills of the Harz mountains. "The terrain became steep and the forest thick, so Ramm decided to dismount from his horse and proceed on foot. He tied his horse off to a nearby tree and went on to pursue the deer for some time. In Ramm’s absence his horse became agitated and nervously pawed at the ground. In repeatedly doing so the horse unearthed a large nugget of metallic ore. Upon Ramm’s return he found the nugget, which he immediately took to his king. By the color and weight of the ore, King Otto could tell it was of great value. He called for his miners to be sent out to investigate. The miners found silver and other metals of such quality and in such quantity as had never before been seen in all of Christendom. The Emperor was so pleased that he named the mountain Rammelsberg after Ramm, and he declared the stream that ran nearby the mines to be named after Ramm’s Wife, Gosa (Goslarer Museum 2017). The town that grew up around the stream was called Goslar and the beer that was brewed from the stream’s water was called Gose."
- According to Bayard Taylor, Otto I might have been associated with an early version of the Kyffhäuser legend, now primarily associated with Frederick Barbarossa.
- Legend associates the art of meistergesang with Otto the Great.

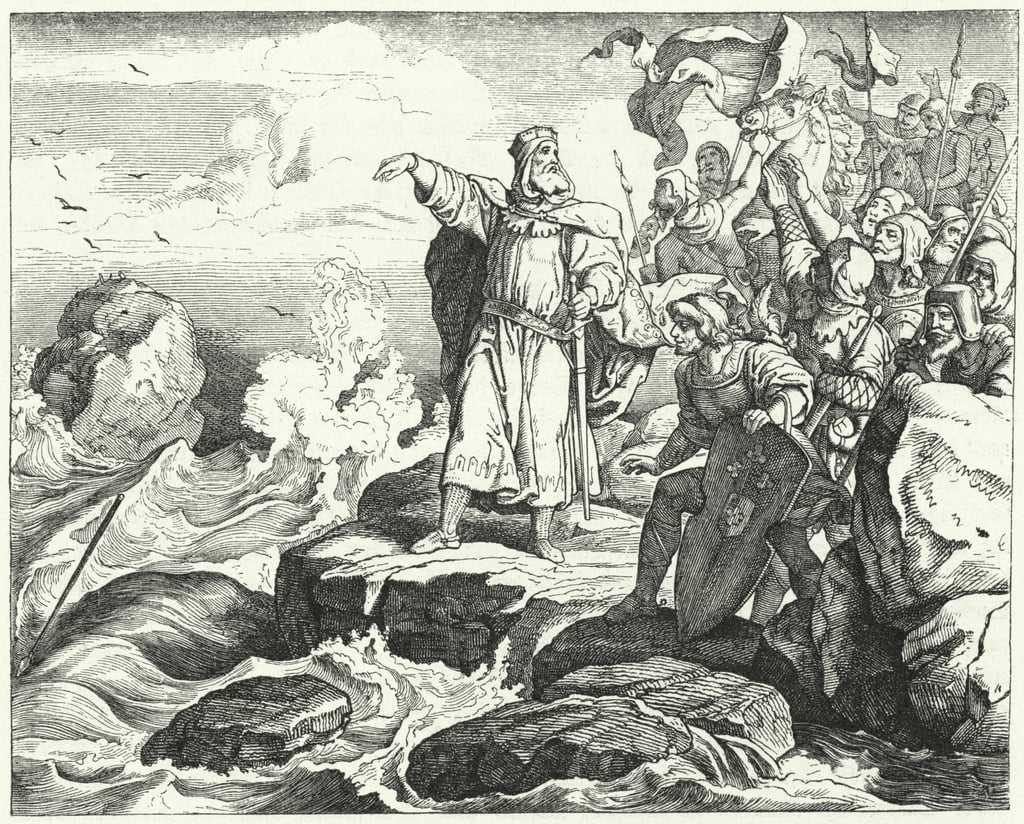
Otto am Nordsee, by Ludwig Richter

- The tenth century manuscript Fuit Tempore, dedicated to Archbishop Gero, recounts that the cult of Saint Ursula was brought to Köln by a Count Hoolfus, who was sent on behalf of Emperor Otto to ask for the hand of Edith. He was introduced to the tale of Saint Ursula and the Virgin Martyrs by the Canterbury Bishop Dunstan. The chronology does not match though. The legend and the export of Ursuline relics reflected the tie between the city and the Anglo side, as well as the growing commercial and ecclesiastic relations between Köln and other European locales of the time.
- There are stories about the relationship between Otto and Harald Bluetooth (who, as Otto's vassal, probably converted to Christianity either because Otto forced him to do so or as a calculated move to gain the emperor's friendship). Reportedly, Otto chased away an invasion force led by Harald, driving them beyond the northernmost point of Jutland and then threw his spear into the North Sea, signalling that this was the limit of the emperor's sovereignty. Ludwig Richter(1803–1884) depicted this scene in an engraving, used as illustration for the book Die deutsche Geschichte in Bildern(1862) by Friedrich Bülau.

== Depictions in arts ==
=== Visual arts ===
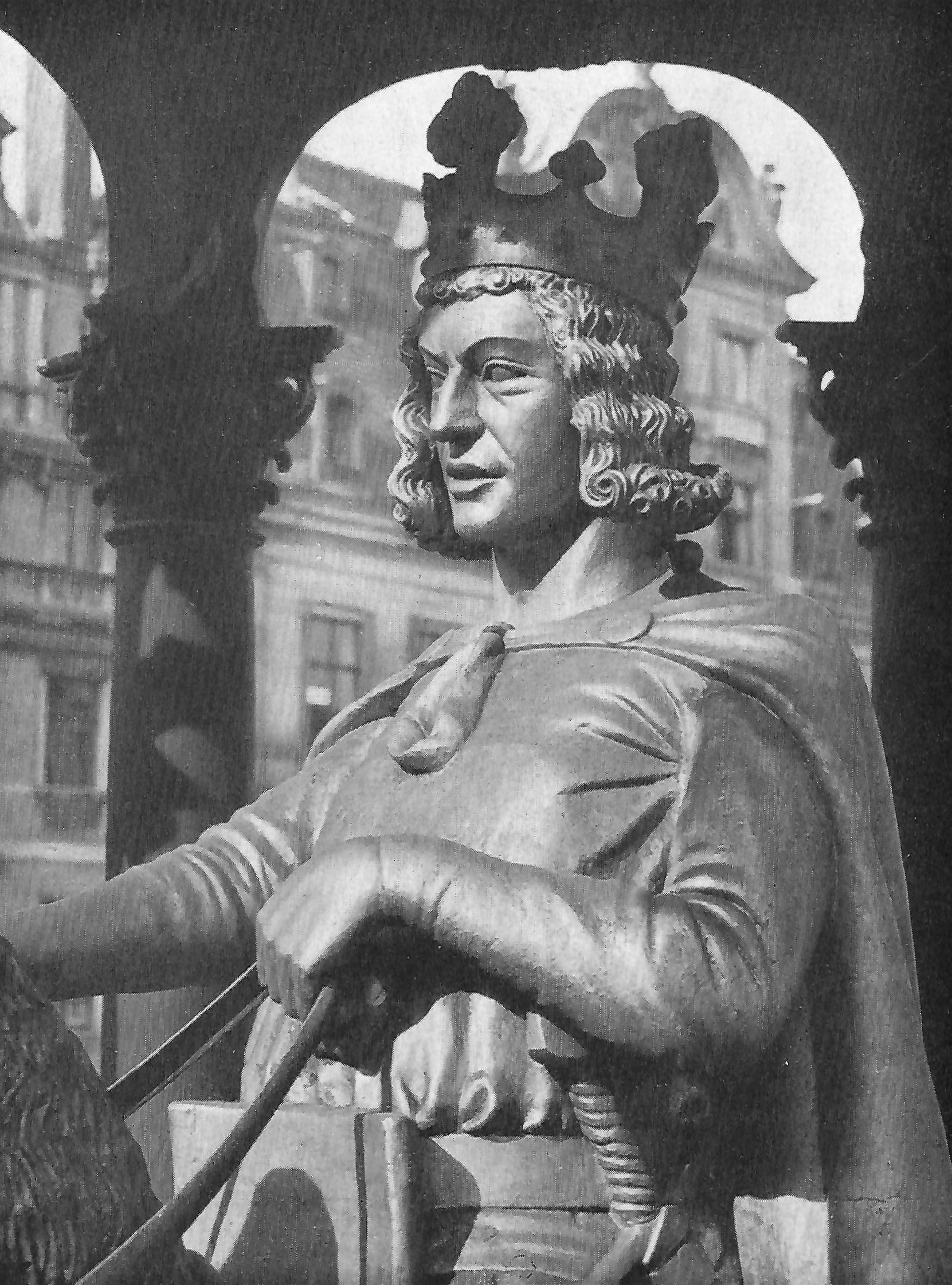
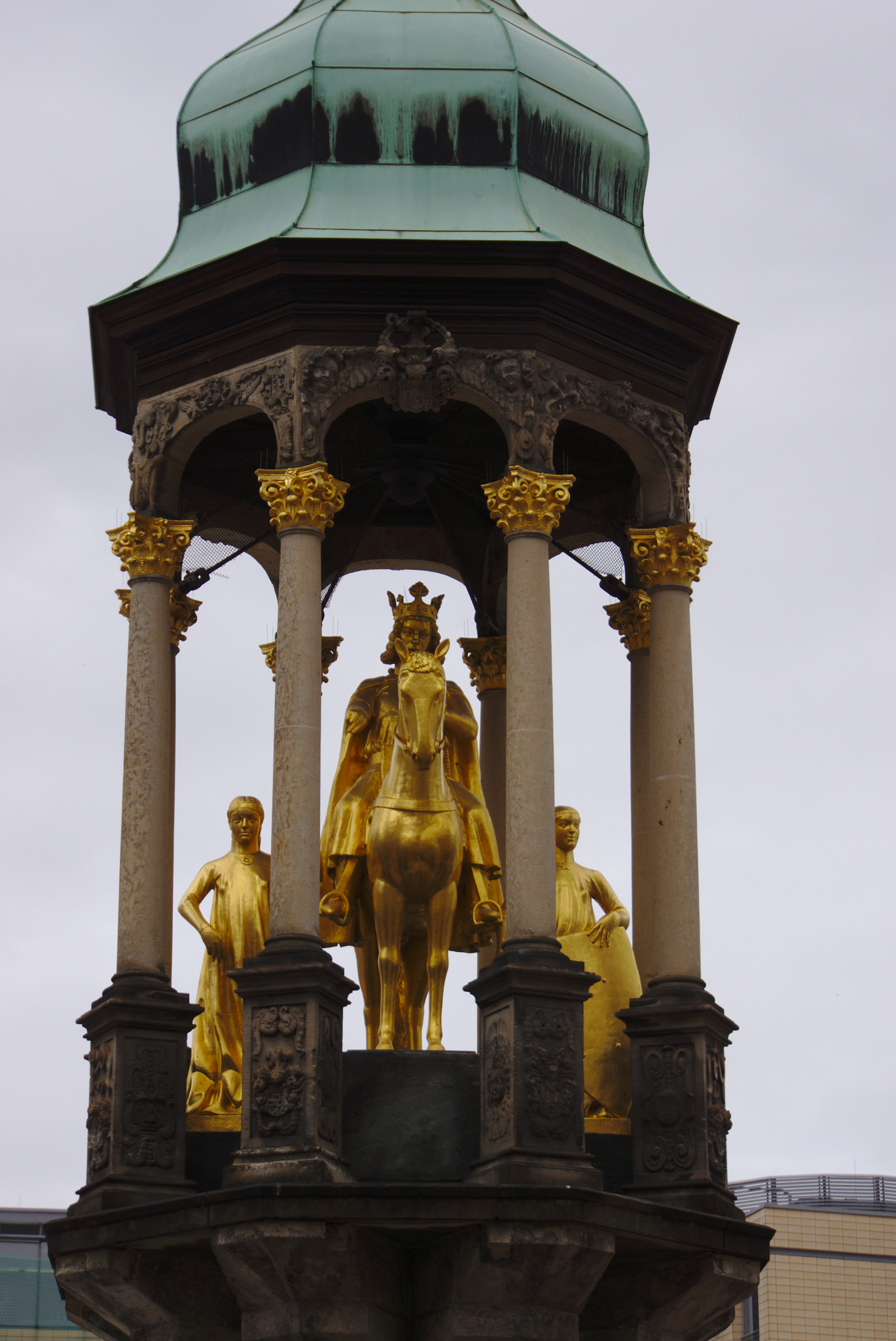
Magdeburg Rider, original (left) and copy (right)
- The royal seal of Otto I, (use from 936 to 961, during the time he used the title of King), shows him with a lance and shield. The lance depicted is the Holy Lance (see also:the Holy Lance in Vienna. His imperial seal (used since 966) shows him holding the imperial orb, the cross scepter and wearing the imperial crown. Since Otto, the cross scepter became popular on imperial seals.
- Plaque with Christ Receiving Magdeburg Cathedral from Emperor Otto I (ivory, between 962 and 968) features a contemporary depiction of the emperor. This belongs to the series Magdeburg Ivories, likely commissioned by Otto. According to the MET, this is "One of the most famous ivory carvings to survive from the tenth century".
- The Magdeburg Rider, most likely a portrayal of Otto I (together with two maiden flanking him), erected in 1240 and now in the Kulturhistorischen Museum Magdeburg (a famous copy stands at the Alten Markt) is Germany's oldest equestrian statue. As the founder of the city and the diocese, Otto has always had an important role in the city's culture of remembrance. Since 2010, the city has been called the Ottostadt (Otto's city) The Magdeburg Rider influenced Maximilian I's plan for his own equestrian monument.

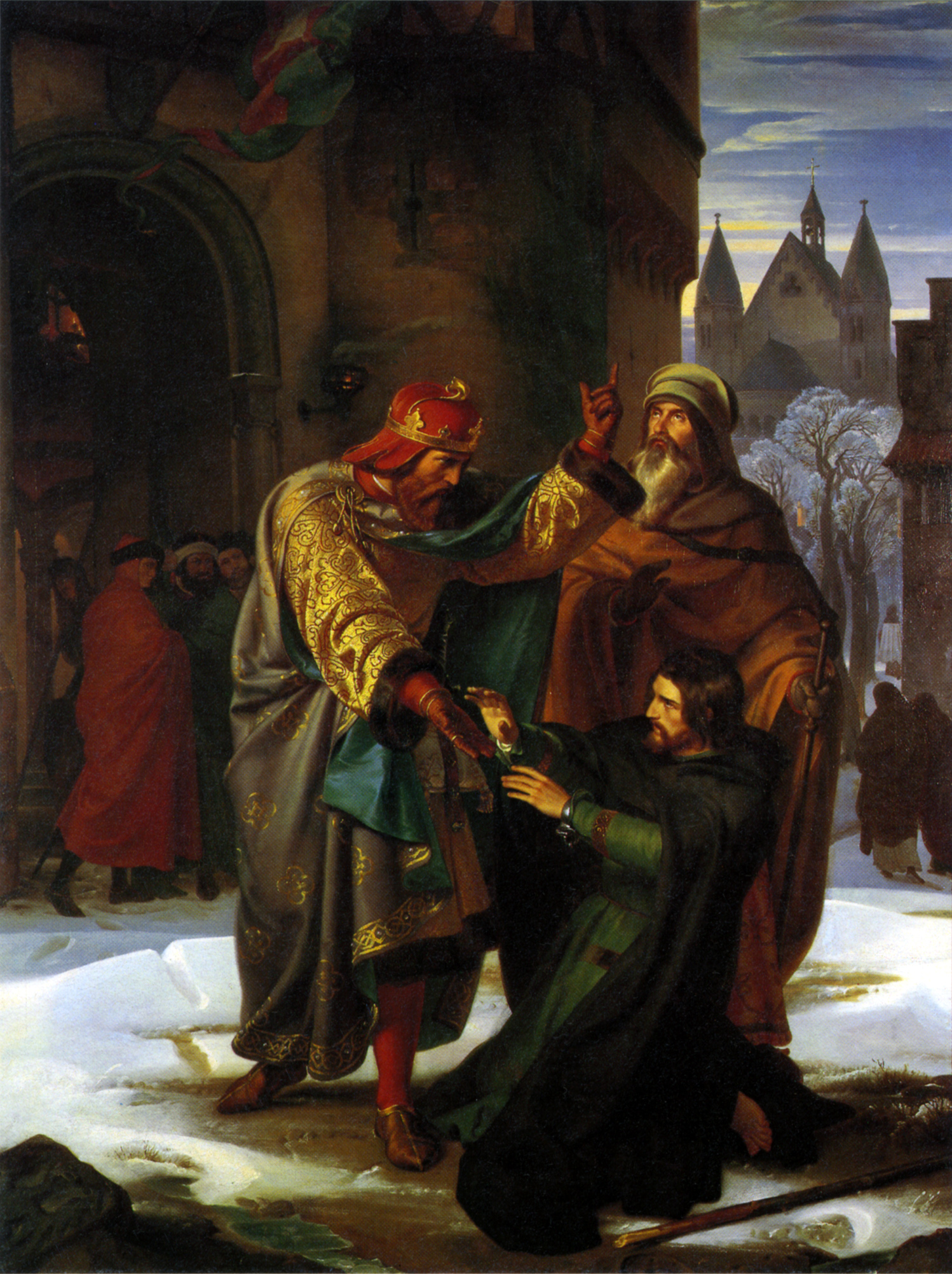
Alfred Rethel's Die Versöhnung Ottos des Großen mit seinem Bruder Heinrich. 1840.

- Among the 32 copperplate engravings depicting the history of Augsburg (the explanations for the engravings were created by historian Paul von Stetten, targeting female readers specifically) for the supraports of the Schaezlerpalais (these engravings were commissioned by the banker Benedikt Adam Liebert (1731-1780), based on drawings by Gottfried Eichler (1715-1770)), No.7 depicts victory of Otto in the Battle of Lechfeld.
- Franz Sales Lochbihler (1777–1854) painted Die Schlacht auf dem Lechfeld, depicting the battle of Lechfeld. Otto, wearing a winged helmet and riding a white horse, was trampling upon a bare-chested Hungarian. Harald Jakobs opines that the painting shows Otto's spirit controlling the wildness of the Magyars, represented by mad-looking horses.
- Alfred Rethel painted the Die Versöhnung Ottos des Großen mit seinem Bruder Heinrich (The Reconciliation of Otto the Great with his brother Henry) in 1840.
- On the subject of Lechfeld, Emil Eugen Sachse(1828–1887) produced the engraving Otto I. schlägt die Ungarn am Lech ("Otto the Great battles the Hungarians in Lechfeld").
- Rudolf Maison (1854–1904) created the statue Kaiser Otto I., verkleinerte Replik der Statue am Reichstagsgebäude around 1897
- The Otto's portrait by Philip Veit, painted in 1843, is part of a series depicting emperors who reigned from 768 to 1806 (created from 1839 to 1853) in the Kaisersaal in Frankfurt am Main

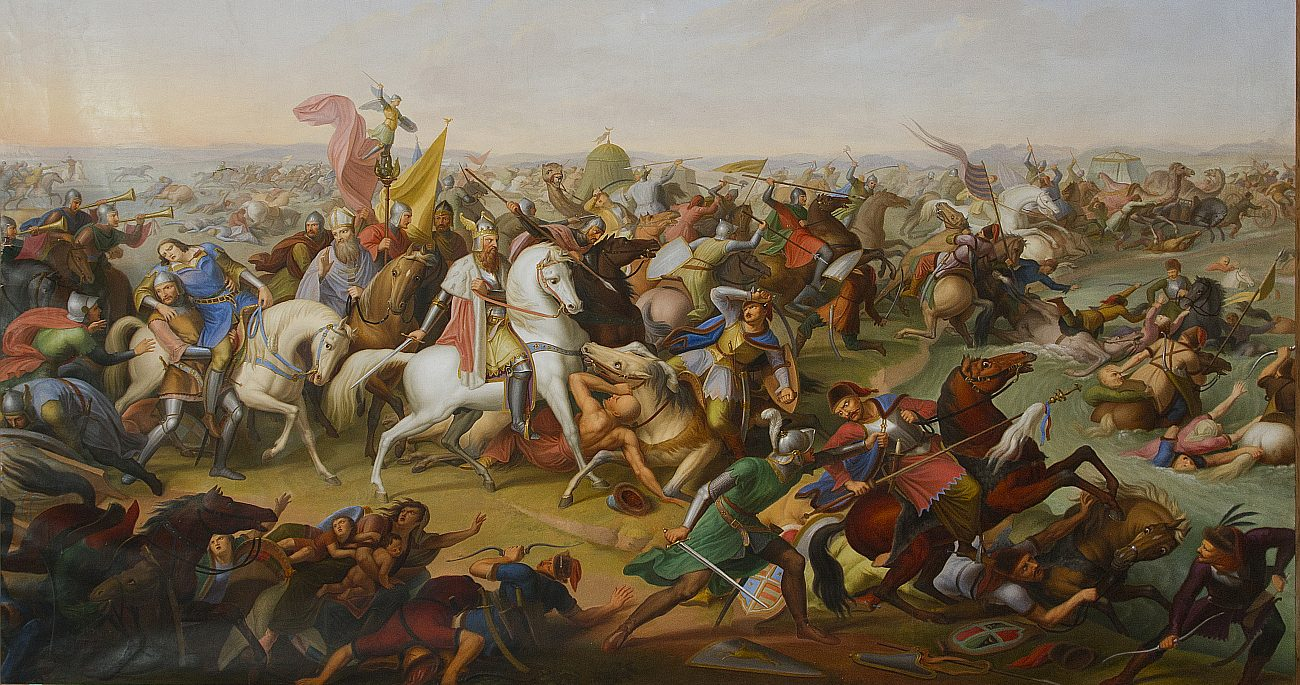
Battle of Lechfeld by Franz Sales Lochbihler

- Albert Baur the Elder (1835–1906) left several paintings that depict Otto's life, among which are Kaiser Otto am Bosporus (1885), depicting the emperor on the coast of Bosphorus, throwing his lance into the sea.; 1874 "Otto the Great triumphs over his dead brother Thankmar".
- In 1892, in 1892, Konstanz's sculptor Hans Baur (1829-1897), won the competition to build a fountain to replace the then dilapidated fountain in the Marktstätte. Baur built a red sandstone four-sided stele or obelisk at the centre of a granite basin of the fountain, now called Kaiserbrunnen (Imperial Fountain). Four great German emperors, representing four great ruling dynasties were chosen: Heinrich III (Franks), Friedrich Barbarossa (Hohenstaufen), Maximilian I (Habsburg) und Wilhelm I (Hohenzollern). The choices and manners of depicting the emperors were considered traditional. When the new fountain was unveiled on 30 October 1897, Bauer had died six months before. Later, the portraits were melted down during wartime. In 1993, new imperial portraits were made by Gernot and Barbara Rumpf. Maximilian, together with his second wife Bianca Maria Sforza, and Frederick Barbarossa returned, depicted in a caricatural manner, while Otto (left) was introduced, replacing Henry – unlike the other two emperor, Otto is depicted in a serious, reverent manner. The bird on his shoulder is similar to the bird on Bianca's bonnet, seemingly a representation of the female power and influence on the throne (Otto has a reputation of working in harmony with his wives, unlike Maximilian with Bianca).

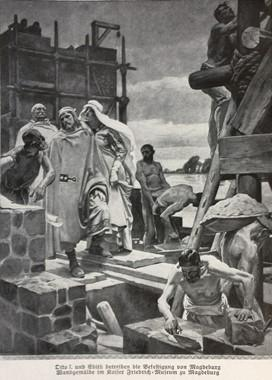
Otto I und Edith betreiben die Befestigung von Magdeburg

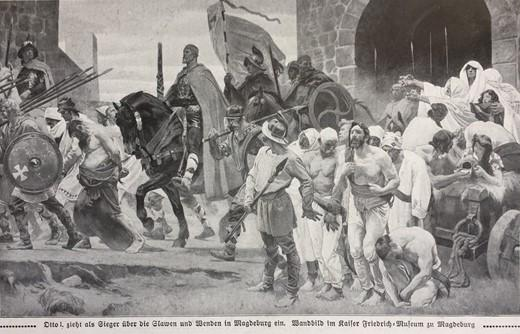
Otto I zieht als Sieger über die Slawen und Wenden in Magdeburg ein

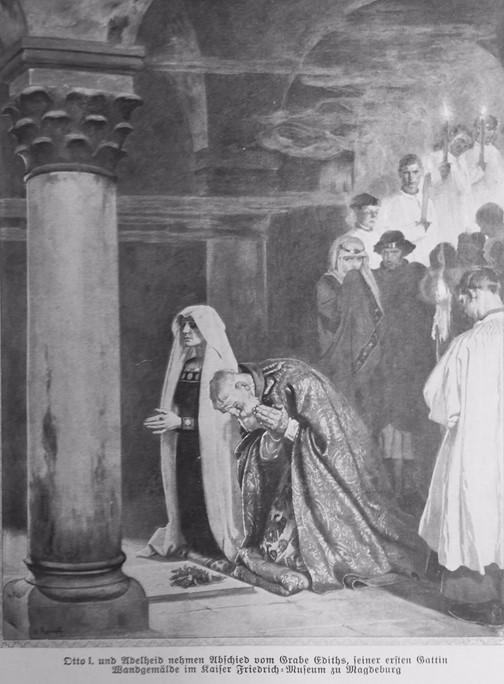
Otto I and Adelheid nehmen Abschied vom Grabe Ediths, seiner ersten Gattin

Arthur Kampf's 1906 series Otto des Grossen Beziehungen zu Magdeburg (Otto the Great and his relation to Magdeburg)
- Alexander Zick (1845 – 1907) created the historical painting Otto der Große vergiebt seinem Bruder Heinrich (Otto the Great forgives his brother Henry), which is the model of the woodcut of the same name, shown in the 1897 book Die Gartenlaube.
- In 1906, Arthur Kampf created the monumental wall painting, Otto des Grossen Beziehungen zu Magdeburg (German King Otto the Great (912-973) and his relation to the city of Magdeburg), composed of three parts: The left part of the painting,Otto I und Edith betreiben die Befestigung von Magdeburg (Otto I and Edith running the Fortification Magdeburg); the mid part, Otto I zieht als Sieger über die Slawen und Wenden in Magdeburg ein (Otto I, conqueror of the Slavs and the Wends, enters the city of Magdeburg); the right part, Otto I and Adelheid nehmen Abschied vom Grabe Ediths, seiner ersten Gattin (Otto I and Adelheid at the grave of Edith, his first wife).
- In 1930, Tancredi Scarpelli (1866–1937) made a photolithography artwork that depicts Otto crossing the Brenner Pass to invade Italy in 951 as illustration for the work Storia d' Italia - narrata al popolo, di Paolo Giudici.

=== Literature ===
- The famous nun and scholar Hrosvitha wrote the epic poem Gesta Ottonis, commissioned by Abbess Gerberga II, Abbess of Gandersheim. Hrosvitha played special attention to the female characters in Otto's life and the partnership between male rulers and female consorts as well.
- Liudolf: A Historical Drama of the Time of Otto the Great is an 1899 five-act drama about Otto's son Liudolf. At the last scene, Liudolf reconciled with his father after saving his life.
- Die Krone von Gott historischer Roman über Kaiser Otto den Großen und den Kampf für ein einheitliches Reich ("The crown of God, historical novel about Emperor Otto the Great and the struggle for a unified empire") is a 2001 novel by Theo Winnen.
- Abgründe der Macht: Ein Roman über Otto den Großen ("Abysses of Power: A Novel about Otto the Great") is a 2016 novel about the emperor by Robert Gordian.
- Das Haupt der Welt historischer Roman by Rebecca Gablé is a 2018 historical novel about Otto the Great. Book 1 is Otto der Große; Book 2 is Die fremde Königin ("The foreign queen", referring to Adelaide of Italy).

=== Music ===
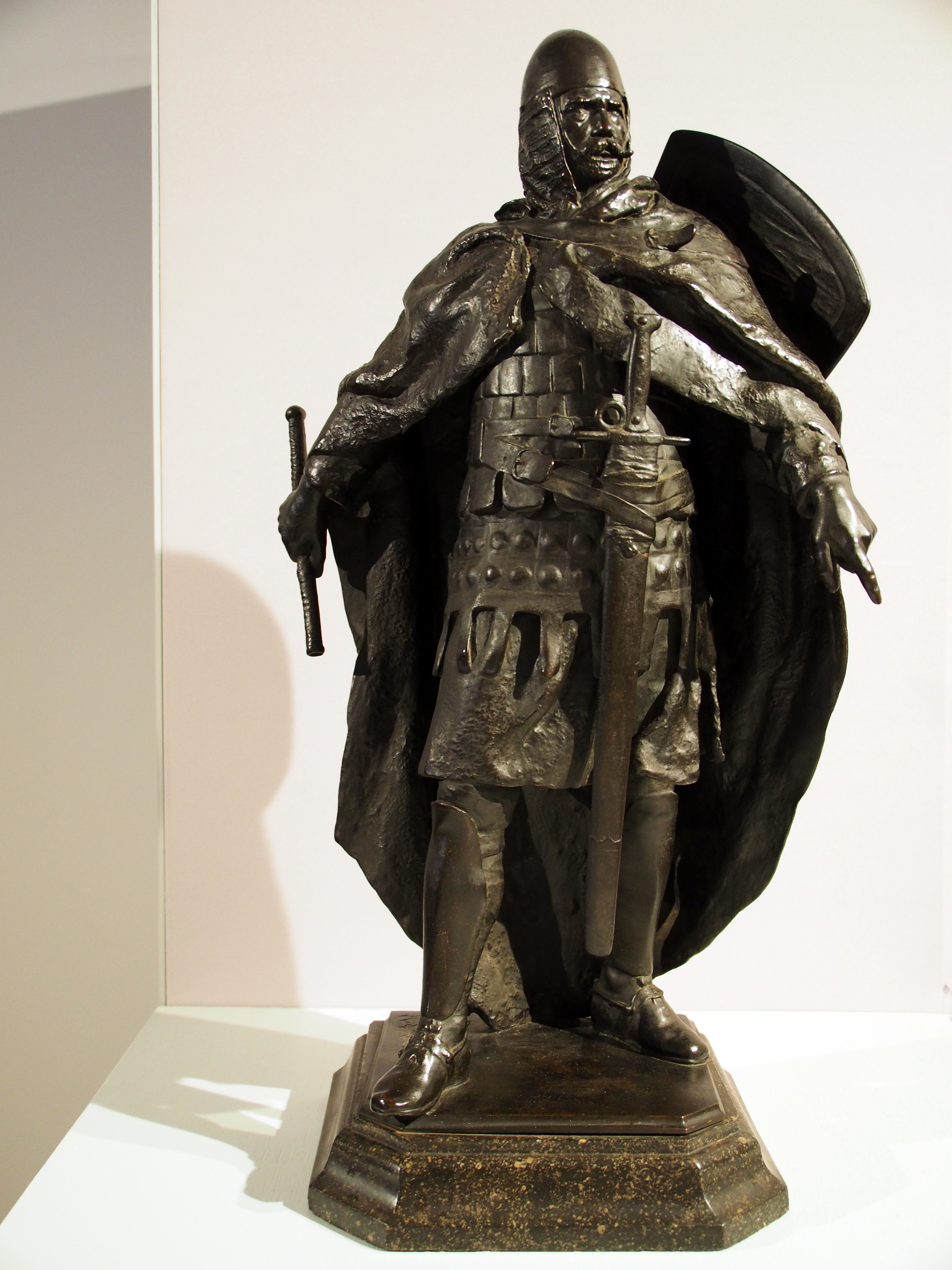
Rudolf Maison's Kaiser Otto I. Historisches Museum Regensburg 20160929 21

- The story of Baldracca (dramma per musica, 1679), with music by Antonio Draghi and text by Nicolo Minato, is about Henry's rebellion against his brother Otto.
- Ottone il Grande (dramma per musica, 1682), with music attributed to Paolo Biego and text by Francesco Silvani recounts Otto's career and his marriage to Adelaide.
- Foca superbo (dramma per musica, 1715) with Music attributed to Antonio Lotti and text by Antonio Maria Lucchini, dedicated to Karl, Landgrave of Hesse). The main story is about the historical Phocas, who murdered Maurice in 602 to control the Eastern Roman Empire and ruled until 610. But the account is tangled anachronistically with tales of Otto the Great, his son (Otto) and Honoria.
- He is a character in Heinrich der 'Vogler' Hertzog zu Braunschweig, nachmahls Erwehlter Teutscher Käyser (1718), a Singe-Spiel with music by Georg Caspar Schürmann and text by Johann Ulrich König, premiered in Braunschweig (Part 2 by the same authors were premiered in 1721).
- Teofane (1719) by Antonio Lotti is about Otto's reign and written for the occasion of Charles Albrecht of Wittelsbach, later Holy Roman Emperor (the only non-Habsburg emperor of the late Empire) and Maria Amalia of Habsburg. In the same occasion, Adelaide (1719) was written by Pietro Torri with text by Antonio Salvi.
- Ottone. Re di Germania is a 1723 opera in three acts written by Georg Friedrich Händel, Haym/Stephano Pallavicino.
- In Amore e Sdegno (dramma per musica, 1726) with music attributed to Luigi Tavelli and text by Michel Angiolo Boccardi tells the following story: "After murdering the Eastern emperor, the tyrant Nicophoros Phocas worried that the widowed empress Nicaea would ascend to the throne. To smooth his own way to a higher post, he offered the hand of his daughter to the [Holy Roman] emperor Otto [the Great. 962-73]. He later regretted not having offered her instead to seal an alliance with the Persian king, Tigraes".
- Dalisa by Johann Hasse (1730).
- Otto der Große is a great concert-cantata written by Karl Adolf Lorenz (1837 – 1923)
- Georg Wilhelm Rauchenecker (1844 – 1906) wrote Kaiser Otto I., a "Cantata for solo and choral singing with piano accompaniment." The poetry is by H. Y. Müller. The content is about Otto's reconciliation with his brother Henry.
- Ottone (Adelaide), "A dramma per musica" with music by Gennaro D'Alessandro with text by Antonio Salvi and Carlo Goldoni, is a 1739 work with Otto as its subject.
- Adelaide di Borgogna is an 1817 opera by Gioachino Rossini, that features Otto as a character.
- König Otto's Brautfahrt ("King Otto's bridal ride"), a historical-romantic opera in three acts (historisch-romantische Oper in drie Akten) by Adalbert Ueberlée with text by Roderich Fels, is an 1881 work about Otto and Adelaide.
- Otto der Große is a 1907 opera in three acts by Bernhard Karlipp about the emperor.

=== Theater ===
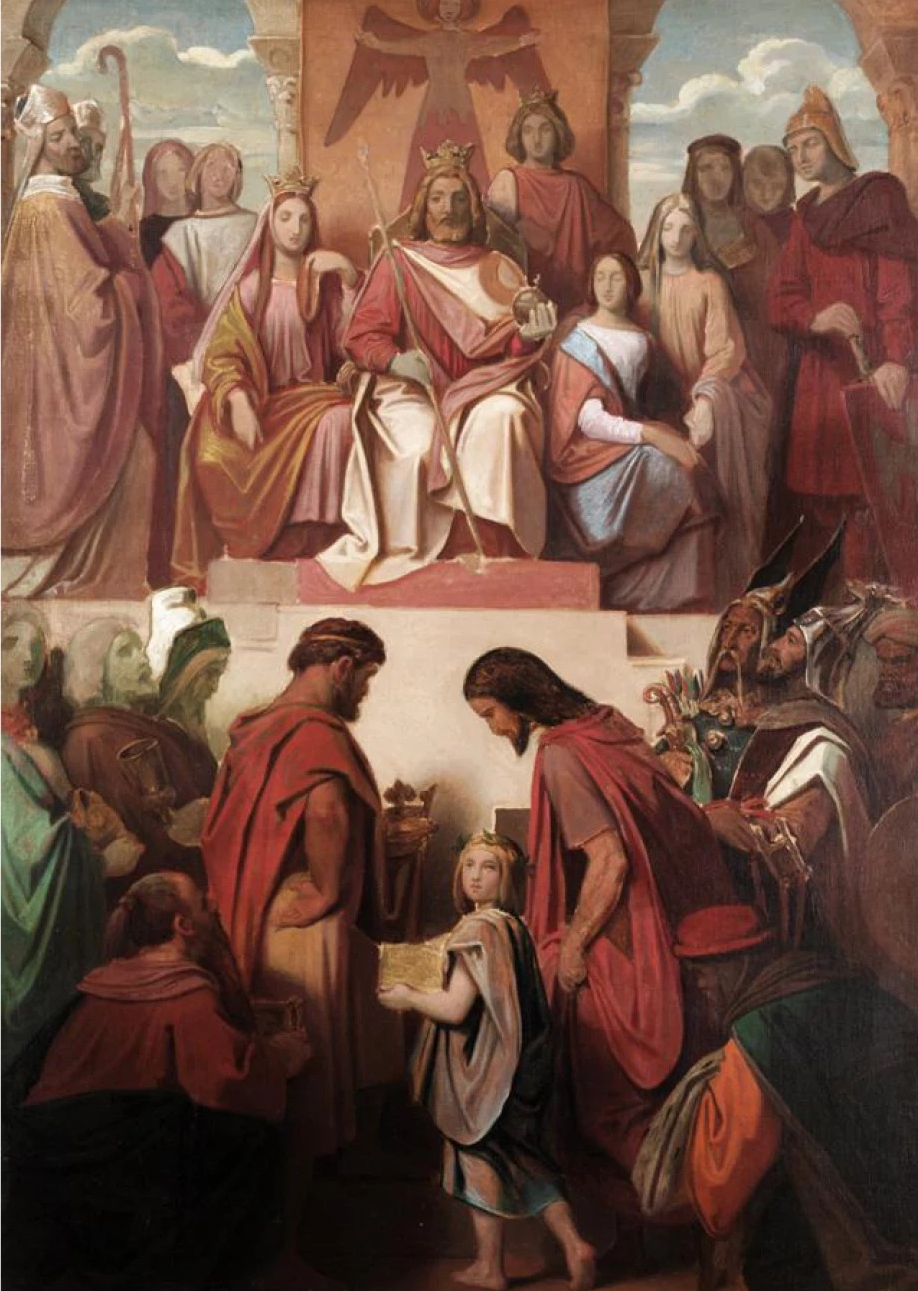
Der Hoftag Ottos des Großen in Quedlinburg 973, um 1850 (The Court of Otto the Great in Quedlinburg or Emperor Otto I celebrating Whitsuntide at Quedlingburg, 973) by Moritz von Schwind, 1850. Oil on canvas.

- Jo Fabian's 2013 Ottos Traum addresses the founding myth of Magdeburg, the Ottostadt, mixing elements of theater, dance and visual art.

=== Documentaries ===
- In the first episode of Die Deutschen, Otto und das Reich (2008), he is portrayed by David Bunners.
- He is depicted in Terra X's Deutschland-Saga (2013–2015), also by David Bunners.

== Commemoration ==
The year of 2023 will be the 1050th commemoration of the emperor's death. The Kulturhistorisches Museum Magdeburg and Cathedral Museum Ottonianum Magdeburg are planning various events, including exhibitions, educational programs and expert talks honouring Otto's last journey to his homeland, now in Saxony-Anhalt.

== See also ==
- Cultural depictions of Adelaide of Italy
- Cultural depictions of Theophanu
- Cultural depictions of Otto III, Holy Roman Emperor
- Cultural depictions of Conrad II, Holy Roman Emperor
- Cultural depictions of Frederick I, Holy Roman Emperor
- Cultural depictions of Frederick II, Holy Roman Emperor
- Cultural depictions of Charles IV, Holy Roman Emperor
- Cultural depictions of Sigismund, Holy Roman Emperor
- Cultural depictions of Maximilian I, Holy Roman Emperor
- Cultural depictions of Charles V, Holy Roman Emperor
