= Forgeries of Lorch =

The Forgeries of Lorch, also known as Lorch Forgeries, is a collection of forged papal bulls completed in the second half of the 10th century. It is attributed to the Bishop Pilgrim of Passau in 971 to 991 and contained forged epistles that dealt with the definition of the bishopric's jurisdiction.

== Background ==
Most specialists agree that the collection of documents, known as the Forgeries of Lorch, was completed for Pilgrim, who was made Bishop of Passau in 971. After he came into conflict with Frederick I, Archbishop of Salzburg for the ecclesiastic jurisdiction in Pannonia, Pilgrim forged the papal bulls. The earliest of the bulls was attributed to the 4th-century Pope Symmachus.

Pilgrim believed that Lauriacum (now Lorch in Enns in Austria) was the metropolitan see of the Diocese of Pannonia in the Roman Empire. He also thought that the archdiocese of Lauriacum had been moved from Lauriacum to Passau.

== Documents ==
Pilgrim's forgeries include six papal documents falsified or corrupted by Bishop Pilgrim of Passau between 971 and 985 as scribes of the royal firm, a letter from the bishop to Pope Benedict VI or Benedict VII. There were also two alleged letters of Archbishop Hatto from Mainz to an unnamed Pope. A total of five papal bulls were forged and one of the letters from Hatto of Mainz to an unknown Pope, attempted to prove that Lorch was an archiepiscopal see before Salzburg. Pilgrim's counterfeits, were to make the diocese of Passau the legal successor to the ancient archbishopric of Lauriacum, thus establishing the rank of an archbishopric. This late antique bishopric Lauriacum was mentioned in the Vita Sancti Severini.

One of the specific contents involved the claim that Saint Peter sent missionaries to convert Lorch in the year 47 and establish a see. Furthermore, the documents also indicated that Passau be endowed with a vast archdiocese, immense property, and no less than twenty-two suffragan bishoprics including Grado, Würzburg, and Prague.

== Sources ==
- Arnold, Benjamin (2003). "Episcopal Authority Authenticated and Fabricated: Form and Function in Medieval German Bishops' Catalogues". In Reuter, Timothy (ed.). Warriors and Churchmen in the High Middle Ages: Essays Presented to Karl Leyser. Bloomsbury Academic. pp. 63–78. ISBN 1-85285-063-9.
- Bowlus, Charles R. (1994). Franks, Moravians and Magyars: The Struggle for the Middle Danube, 788–907. University of Pennsylvania Press. ISBN 0-8122-3276-3.
