= Lauriacum =

Ancient Roman city, now Enns, Austria

Coordinates: 48°13′0″N 14°28′30″E

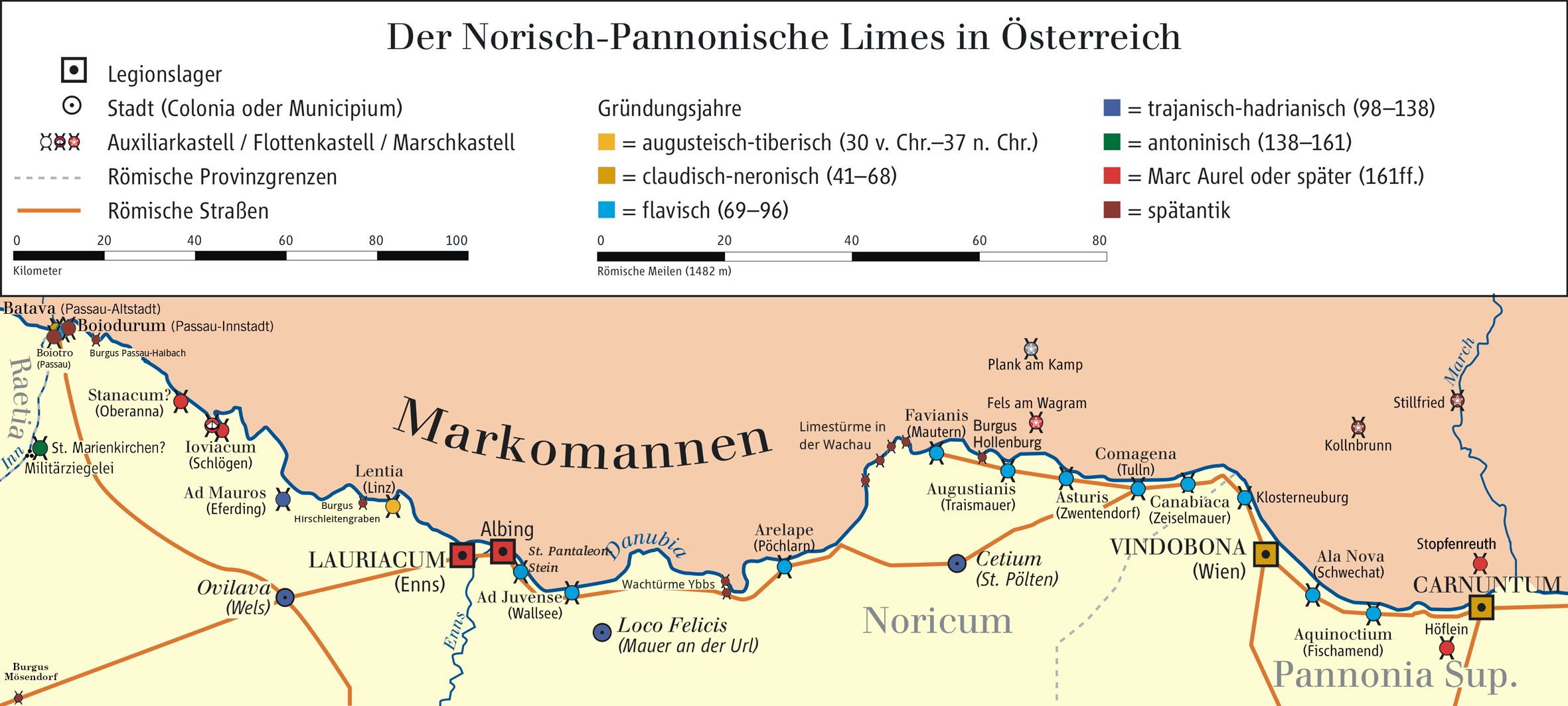
Map of the Danubeian Limes.

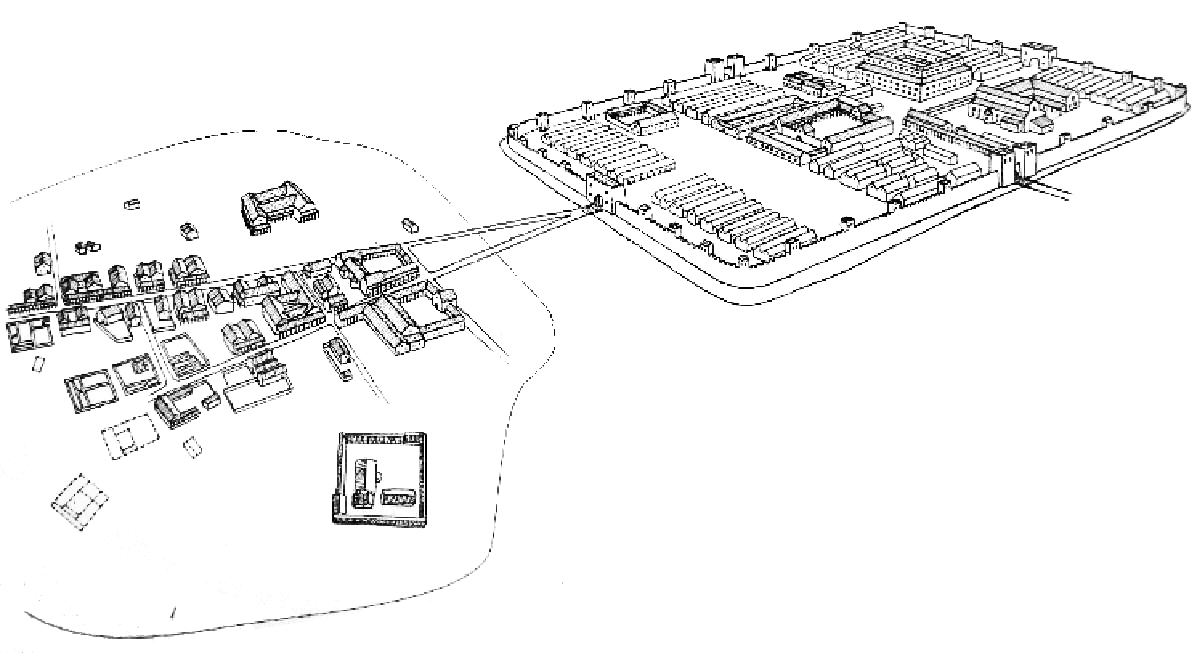
Reconstruction of the camp and adjoining oppidum.

Lauriacum (or Laureacum) was an important legionary Roman town on the Danube Limes in Austria.

== History ==
=== Roman era ===
Initially only a small Roman settlement was located at a ford over the Enns. The Legio II Italica built a legion camp around 200 AD, after the abandonment of an older site in Albin next to Virunum (In the area of today's Zollfeld at Maria Saal) and Ovilava (Wels) as administrative center for the Roman province of Noricum. The legionary camp was subsequently also part of the fortifications of the limes and probably from the 3rd to the 5th century continuously occupied with Roman troops. In the north and south-west was an extensive civilian settlement, which was probably raised to the municipality in the early third century and rose to the bishop's seat of the northern Noricum in the 5th century. Grave fields could also be found at numerous places inside and outside the settlement area.

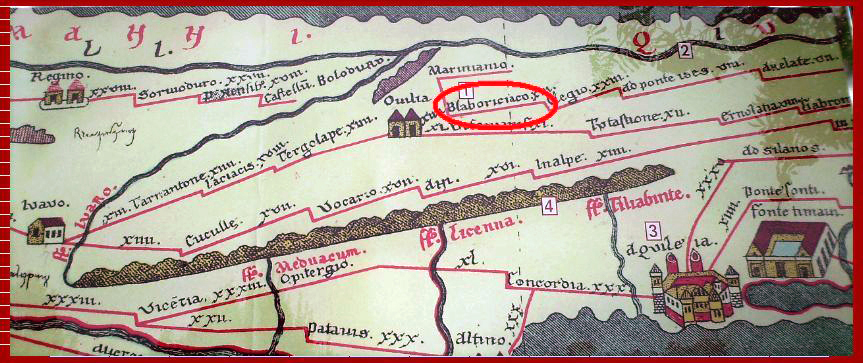
Lauriacum on the Tabula Peutingeriana.

In the late period, it became the base for a patrol boat fleet and the production site of a state shield factory. After the abandonment of the border in Noricum and Rhaetia as a result of the dissolution of the Western Roman Empire, Lauriacum once again played a historically important role in the evacuation of the Roman population by Severinus of Noricum. The bulk of the ancient building fabric fell victim to the extraction of stone material in the Middle Ages and in modern times, various building activities, agricultural use and soil erosion. The best preserved ancient and early medieval testimonies are the remains of their predecessors accessible in the lower church of the today's Basilica of St. Lawrence.

=== Middle Ages ===
Although today it is part of the city of Enns, the district was its own settlement in the Middle Ages. The town emerged from the Roman town of Lauriacum, named for St Lawrence.

Roman Lauriacum (Lorch) was mentioned in the Vita Sancti Severini and the Lauriacensis scutaria (fabrica). Notitia Dignitatum.

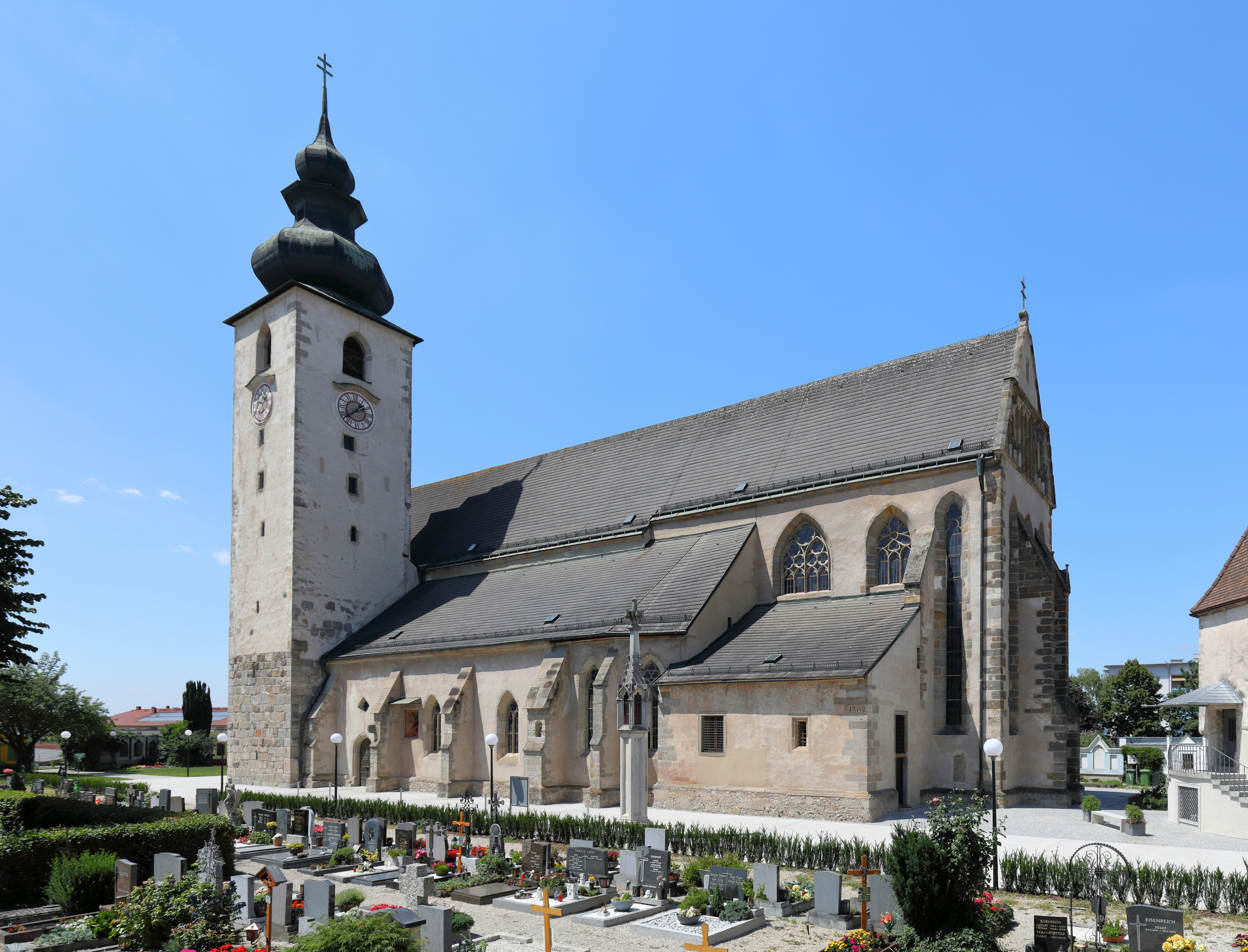
Basilica of St. Lawrence

Between 1960 and 1966 archaeological excavations were used to open walls of Roman predecessors (dated from 180 AD). The first Christian church (4th–5th century) and other church buildings from the first millennium were also excavated. The town's present church is Gothic and was built around 1300.

== Archaeology ==
After completion of the excavation work in 1966 St. Laurenz quickly received new attention:

- 1968: new survey of the town parish church
- 1968: survey of the first titular archbishopric of Central Europe; First titular archbishop of Lauriacum was Girolamo Prigione, former nuncio in Guatemala, El Salvador and Mexico.
- 1970: Ascent to the Basilica minor by Pope Paul VI.
- 1988: Visit by Pope John Paul II, who conducted a Wort-Gottes-Feier ("Celebration of the word of God") liturgy at the Basilica of St. Lawrence with thousands of devotees in attendance.

== Diocese of Lauriacum ==
Lauriacum is a titular see of the Roman Catholic Church, and the cathedra was centered in the district of Lorch in the city of Enns.

The ancient diocese may have been a somewhat structured missionary mission founded by Aquileia and moved to the Limes with the relocation of the capital of Noricum from Teurnia (in Carinthia, Diocese of Tiburnia) to Ovilava (Wels). In the turmoil of the Migration Period, it was abandoned after the withdrawal of the Romans in 488, and was not replaced by the Bavarian and Hiberno-Scottish missions at the dioceses of Salzburg and Passau).

=== Known bishops ===
- Maximilian of Celeia (fl about 284), the first bishop according to legend
- Constantius of Lauriacum (5th century), head of the municipality of Enns, mentioned the Vita Sancti Severini.
- Girolamo Prigione, apostolic nuncio, Apostolischer Pro-Nunctio, Apostolischer Delegat (1968–2016)
- Andrzej Józwowicz, apostolic nuncio, 2017–current

=== Lorcher fakes ===
The so-called Lorcher counterfeits, also known as the Pilgrim Fakes, were an attempt by Bishop Pilgrim of Passau to claim the Diocese of Passau as the legitimate successor to the Diocese of Lauriacum.

In the Basilica of St. Lawrence is an oversized painting (8 x 5 m) dating from 1728 which the corresponding bishops call and depict according to the Lorcher falsification.
