= Dümmler family =

Dümmler is a German surname:

- Ferdinand Dümmler (publisher) (1777–1846), German book seller and publisher
  - Ernst Ludwig Dümmler (1830–1902), German historian; son of Ferdinand
    - Georg Ferdinand Dümmler (1859–1896), German classical philologist and archaeologist; son of Ernst
