= Book of Songs (Heinrich Heine) =

Poetry collection by Heinrich Heine

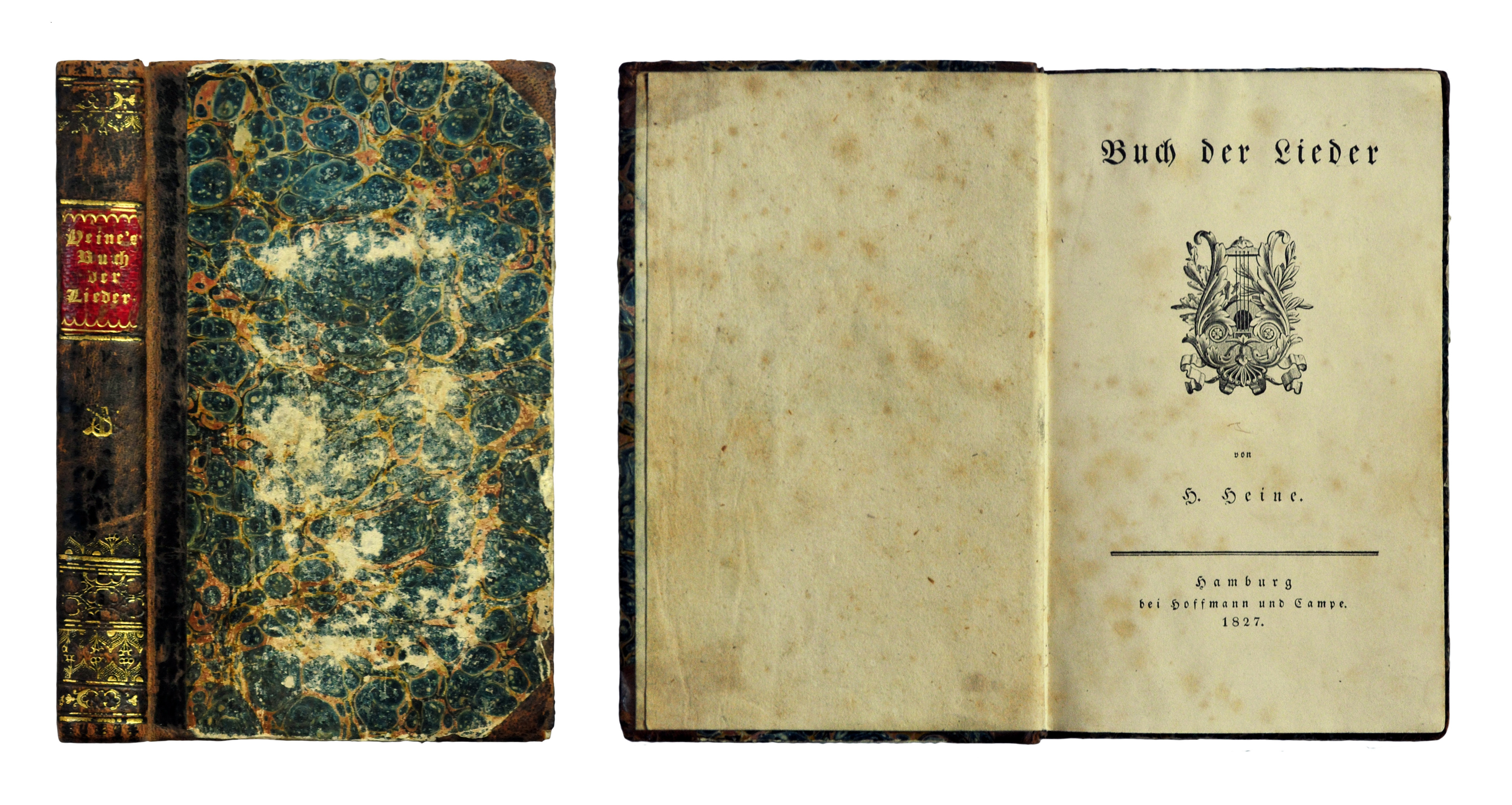

The Book of Songs (Buch der Lieder) was Heinrich Heine's first major collection of poetry, in which he compiled all his poems known at the time. The first edition was published in 1827 in Hamburg by Hoffmann und Campe.

== Background ==
The Book of Songs contains hardly any new poems, but rather represents a chronological collection of already published works. In a letter dated November 16, 1826, to Friedrich Merckel, Heine writes:

Some friends insist that I should publish a selected collection of poems, arranged chronologically and rigorously chosen, and believe that it will be just as popular as the Bürger, Goethe, Uhland, etc. Varnhagen gives me many rules in this regard. I would include part of my early poems […] I would not charge a penny for this book; its affordability and other requirements for becoming popular would be my only considerations. It would be my joy to show masons and Dümmlers that I can manage, and this book would be my main work and provide a psychological portrait of me – the dark-serious youth poems, the “Intermezzo” combined with “Homecoming,” pure blooming poems, e.g., those from the “Harzreise”, and some new ones, and finally all the colossal Epigrams. Do find out from Campe if he dislikes such a plan and whether he expects sales for such a book – it would not be an ordinary collection of poems. (Note: Line breaks at the end of lines have not been retained from the source)

The publisher Julius Campe was initially against the book but later changed his mind and published it.

== Structure ==
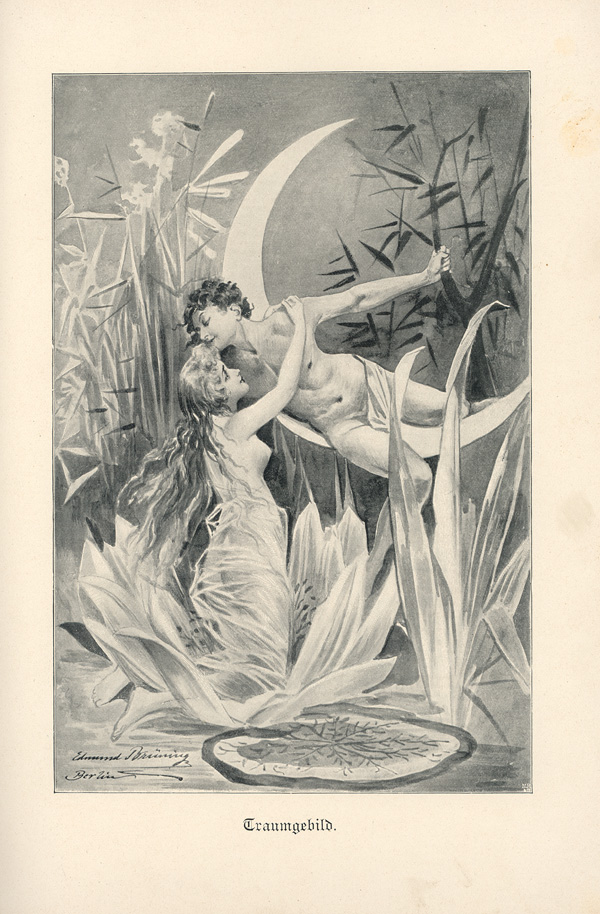
Illustration by Edmund Brüning for The Lotus Flower Distresses from Lyrical Intermezzo.

The Book of Songs consists of several cycles:

- Young Sorrows, consisting of Dream Images, Songs, Romances, and Sonnet Crown
- Lyrical Intermezzo
- Homecoming
- From the Harz Journey
- The North Sea, consisting of First Cycle and Second Cycle.

All cycles had previously appeared under different titles. For example:

- Young Sorrows: Poems. Mauersche Bookstore, Berlin 1822.
- Lyrical Intermezzo: Tragedies, along with a Lyrical Intermezzo. Ferdinand Dümmler, Berlin 1823.
- Homecoming, From the Harz Journey, The North Sea, First Cycle: Travel Pictures, Part One. Hoffmann und Campe, Hamburg 1826.
- The North Sea, Second Cycle: Travel Pictures, Part Two. Hoffmann und Campe, Hamburg 1827.

In total, the Book of Songs contains 237 poems, of which 8 are new. Many of the poems had already been published prior to printing in one of the above-mentioned publications in magazines outside the cycles. Some had already been printed four times.

Nevertheless, the Book of Songs became a great success and was published in numerous new editions.

== Content ==
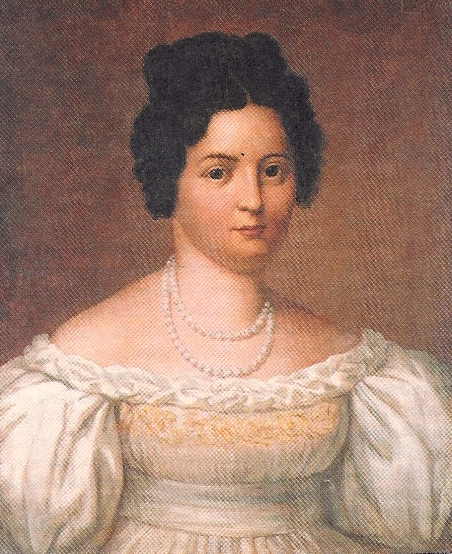
Amalie Heine

The Book of Songs encompasses poems written between 1817 and 1826, representing Heine's early work. It took almost twenty years for the second major poetry collection, New Poems, to be published in 1844 (followed by the third and final collection, Romanzero, in 1851). The political satire typical of Heine's later works, such as Germany. A Winter's Tale, is not much found in the Book of Songs. Instead, 142 of the 237 poems deal with unrequited love. Heine's feelings for his cousin Amalie and later for her seven years younger sister Therese (1807–1880), (Note: She married Christian Hermann Adolf von Halle (1798–1866), President of the Hamburg Commercial Court.) both daughters of Salomon Heine, are cited as explanations for this interpretation. Heine expressed his views on such interpretations in a letter to Karl Immermann dated June 10, 1823:

Only one thing can hurt me deeply if one attempts to explain the spirit of my poems through the history (you know what this word means) of the author. It wounded me deeply and bitterly when I saw yesterday in a letter from an acquaintance how he tried to construct my entire poetic being from compiled little stories and made ungracious remarks about life impressions, political position, religion, etc. Such a thing publicly expressed would have completely outraged me, and I am very glad that nothing like that has ever happened. How easily the history of a poet could provide insight into his poem, how easy it could be demonstrated that often political position, religion, private hatred, prejudice, and considerations have influenced his poem, one must never mention this, especially not during the poet's lifetime. It is as if one deflowers the poem, as if one tears apart its mysterious veil, when that historical influence which one proves to exist is actually present; one distorts the poem if one has falsely delved it in. And how little the external framework of our history often corresponds with our actual, inner history! At least with me, it never fits. (Note: Line breaks at the end of lines have not been retained from the source)

The Book of Songs also includes political poems. For example, Donna Clara critiques contemporary antisemitism. Among the most famous poems are The Grenadiers, Loreley (“I do not know what it means”), In the Beautiful Month of May, The Old, Evil Songs, and Belsatzar.

== Censorship ==
Heine had problems with censorship throughout his life – even with the Book of Songs. Here, however, it was less due to political motives and more because of the use of words and phrases that were deemed too obscene. For example, the beginning of a poem that originally appeared in the first edition as:

On your snow-white bosom
I have laid my head

was later changed to:

On your snow-white shoulder
I have leaned my head

Similarly, the poems were criticized for vulgar language. An example with particularly many such expressions is the fresco sonnet Give me the mask; I want to disguise myself.

== Editions ==
After the first edition in 1827, twelve more were published. By the fifth edition, Heine had revised it each time. The editions were published:

1. 1827
2. 1837 (Note: Heine made few changes here and retained the chronological order of the first edition. Per Heine: “Just as little as to the order of time, I changed the poems themselves. Only here and there, in the first section, were a few verses improved. For the sake of space, I omitted the dedications from the first edition.”)
3. 1839
4. 1841 (Note: Not reviewed by Heine himself. Heine wrote, “Unfortunately, I could not give special attention to the fourth edition of this book, and it was printed without prior review.”)
5. 1844 (Last edition revised by Heine)
6. 1847
7. 1849
8. 1851
9. 1851 (Miniature edition)
10. 1852 (Miniature edition)
11. 1853 (Miniature edition)
12. 1855 (Miniature edition)
13. 1876 (Miniature edition – 40th edition)

In contemporary editions of Heine's complete works, including the significant Düsseldorf Heine edition, the early poems are usually referred to under the term “Book of Songs.” Poems that were not included in the Book of Songs can be found in the appendices. The poems are no longer sorted after the older publications.

== Literature ==
- Heinrich Heine: Complete Works in Four Volumes. Volume 1, Poems. 6th edition, Artemis & Winkler Verlag, Munich 1992, pp. 849–879.
- Bernd Kortländer: “I Am a German Poet.” Love and Misfortune in Heine's “Book of Songs.” In: Heine Yearbook 2006. Metzler, Stuttgart/Weimar 2006, pp. 59–73.
- Ingo Müller: Masquerade and Soul Language. On the Aesthetics of Heinrich Heine's “Book of Songs” and Robert Schumann's Settings of Heine (= Rombach Science), 2 volumes. Baden-Baden 2020. Volume 1: Heinrich Heine's Poetic Aesthetics and Robert Schumann's Aesthetics of Song, ISBN 978-3-96821-006-3. Volume 2: Heinrich Heine's Book of Songs and Robert Schumann's Settings of Heine, Baden-Baden 2020, ISBN 978-3-96821-009-4.
