= Archdiocese of Laureacum =

Roman Catholic titular see

The archdiocese of Laureacum (or Lorch) existed in what is now northern Upper Austria. The town of Lorch is 76 miles or 123 kilometers down the Danube to the east from Passau.

== History ==
When Laureacum was established, and became headquarters of Legio II Italica under Marcus Aurelius (161–180), Laureacum was in the 'Danubian' Roman Province of Noricum Ripensis.

In his Historia Ecclesiae Laureacensis, Bernardus Noricus attributed the foundation of the Church of Laureacum (Lorch) to the disciples of Saint Peter. Peter had sent Saint Mark to found the Church of Aquileia, and Mark consecrated Ermachorus, who consecrated Syrus and Evencius, and sent them to Pavia, Verona, Brescia and Laudensis que est Laureacensis sita in Norico Ripensi. A 14th century manuscript, found by Hieronymus Pez in the library of the monastery of Zwethal, containing the "Breve Chronicon Laureacensium et Pataviensium Archiepiscoporum et Episcoporum", provides similar information, but does not contain the words "Laudensis que est."

In 268, Eutherius, Archbishop of Laureacum was said to be in office. He attended the Council of Sardica, according to the "Historia episcoporum Pataviensium et Ducum Bavariae." His name appears among the signatories of the council, as "Eutherius a Pannoniis." The Council, however, took place in 344, not 268. The "Breve Chronicon", moreover remarks that there was no bishop in Laureacum between 308 and 400.

Maximilian of Lorch is said to have been archbishop of Laureacum and to have been killed at Celeia by the Emperor Numerian, who reigned only in 283 and 284. Numerian was in Asia at the time.

Severinus of Noricum (died 482) is credited with rescuing Christian refugees of the invasions of the Alamanni, and settling them at the oppidum of Lauriacum. He was not a bishop.

The letter of Pope Symmachus (498–514) to Archbishop Theodore of Lorch is a forgery of Bishop Pilgrim of Passau (971–991), who was trying to create documents proving that Passau had inherited the archdiocesan status of Lorch.

The diocese was then abandoned for two centuries, in the face of pagan invasions. Lorch is near modern Linz.

In 739, Boniface, the "Apostle to the Germans," divided Bavaria into four dioceses, one of which was situated at Passau.

In 1213, Bernardus Noricus produced the "Catalogus alter archiepiscoporum et episcoporum Laureacensium et Pataviensium."

== Titular see ==
The name Lauriacum was revived as a titular archbishopric in 1968. Its first incumbent was Girolamo Prigione, Apostolic Nuncio emeritus to Mexico; he died on 27 May 2016. Archbishop Andrzej Józwowicz, Apostolic Nuncio to Iran has held the title since 18 March 2017.

== Sources ==
- Bertholdo, Anselmo (1853). "De S. Maximiliano Episc. Mart.," (in Latin), in: Acta Sanctorum Octobris Tomus VI (Bruxelles: Alphonso Greuse 1853), pp. 23–58; esp. 25-31.
- Brackmann, Albertus (ed.). Germania pontificia, Vol. 1, Pars I: Provincia Salisburgensis et episcopatus Tridentinus. (in Latin). Berlin: Weidmann 1910; pp. 157–160.
- Hansiz, Marcus. Germaniae sacræ: Metropolis Lauriacensis cum Episcopatu Pataviensi. (in Latin). Tomus I (1727). Augusta Vindelicorum (Augsburg): Happach & Schlüter.
- Knoell, Pius (ed.). Eugippii opera. Pars II: Eugipii vita Sancti Severini. (in Latin). Wien: C. Gerold 1886.
- Lehr, Waldemar (1909). Piligrim, Bischof von Passau und die Lorcher Falschungen. Berlin: Gustave Schade (Otto Francke) 1909.
- Pez, Hieronymus (1721). Scriptores rerum Austriacarum, Tomus 1. (in Latin). Leipzig: Sumptibus Joh. Frid. Gleditschii b. filii, 1721.
- Rauch, Adrian (1793). Rerum Austriacarum Scriptores, Qui Lucem Publicam Hactenus Non Viderunt Et Alia Monumenta Diplomatica. (in Latin) Volume 2 Stahel, 1793.
- Weitz, G. (ed.) (1880). "Historia episcoporum Pataviensium et Ducum Bavariae," (in Latin). In: Monumenta Germaniae Historica. Scriptorum Tomus XXV. Vol. 25 (Hannover: Hahn 1880), pp. 617–622.
