= Ernst Dümmler =

German historian (1830–1902)

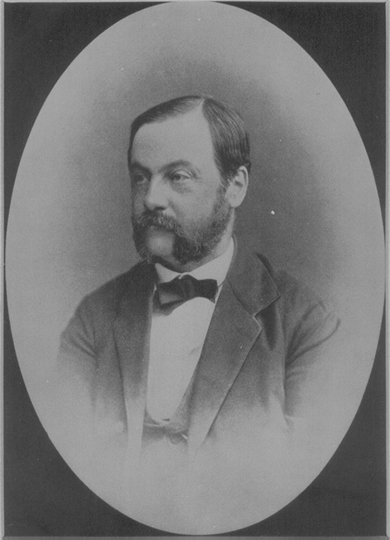

Ernst Ludwig Dümmler (2 January 1830 – 11 September 1902) was a German historian.

== Biography ==
Ernst Ludwig was born in Berlin, the son of Ferdinand Dümmler, a Berlin bookseller. He studied law, classical philology and history, among other things, at Bonn under Johann Wilhelm Löbell, and in Berlin, where his influences were Leopold von Ranke and Wilhelm Wattenbach. His doctorate dissertation, De Arnulfo Francorum rege (Berlin, 1852), was a notable essay among historians.

He entered the faculty at Halle in 1855, and started an historical seminar. In 1858 he became an associate professor, in 1866 full professor. In 1875, he became a member of the revised committee directing the Monumenta Germaniae Historica, himself undertaking the direction of the section "Antiquitates". In 1888 he became president of the central board in Berlin. This was an official recognition of Dümmler's leading position among German historians.

== Selected works ==
In addition to numerous critical works and editions of texts, he published:

- Piligrim von Passau und das Erzbistum Lorch (1854) – Pilgrim of Passau and the Archdiocese of Laureacum.
- Uber die älteste geschichte der Slawen in Dalmatien, 549–928 (1856) – On the early history of the Slavs in Dalmatia (549–928)
- Das Formelbuch des Bischofs Salomo III von Konstanz aus dem neunten Jahrhundert (1857) – Formulary of Bishop Solomon III of Constance from the ninth century.
- Anselm der Peripatetiker (1872) – Anselm the Peripatetic.

His great work was the Geschichte des ostfränkischen Reiches (Berlin, 1862–1865, 2 volumes; 2nd ed., 1887–1888, in 3 volumes). In conjunction with Wattenbach, he completed the Monumenta Alcuiniana (Berlin, 1873), which had been begun by Philipp Jaffé, and with Rudolf Köpke, he wrote Kaiser Otto der Grosse (Leipzig, 1876).

He edited the anonymous Lorsch riddles twice—first in 1879 and then again two years later, in 1881. He also edited the first and second volumes of the "Poetae Latini aevi Carolini" for the Monumenta Germaniae Historica (Berlin, 1881–84).

== Family ==
His son, Georg Ferdinand Dümmler (1859–1896), an archaeologist and philologist, was professor at the University of Basel from 1890 until his death on 15 November 1896, aged 37.
