= Ferdinand Dümmler (publisher) =

German publisher & politician (1777–1846)

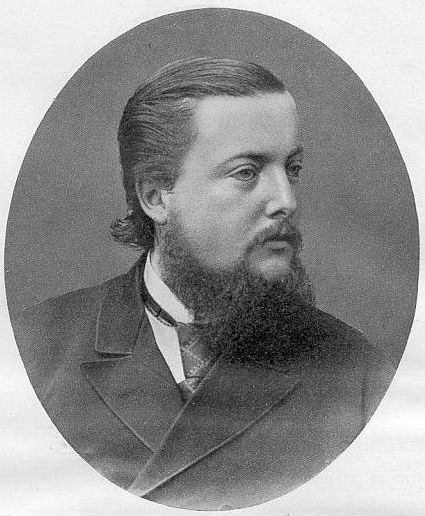
Ferdinand Dümmler (1859–1896), German classical philologist and archaeologist. Photograph by Camille Ruf (owned by Prof. Paul Wolters, Munich)

Ferdinand Dümmler (23 October 1777 – 15 March 1846) was a German publisher and bookseller.

== Life ==
Ferdinand Dümmler was born in Battgendorf near Kölleda, the son of a preacher. He trained as a bookseller in Leipzig in 1792. After his training, in 1798 he was hired as an employee in the Berlin branch of Lange'sche Verlagsbuchhandlung, a bookseller and publisher, where he met and became friends with Georg Andreas Reimer. In 1804, he became managing director and silent partner at the Dieterich'sche Verlagsbuchhandlung publishing company and bookstore in Göttingen. As a volunteer in the Lützow Free Corps during the War of the Sixth Coalition, he was captured during the battle near Kitzen in June 1813. He was held as a prisoner of war in Fenestrelle and Sisteron until being released in April 1814.

On January 1, 1815, he acquired the publishing business founded by Julius Eduard Hitzig in 1808 and operated it under the name "Ferd. Dümmlersche Verlagsbuchhandlung" thereafter. Also in 1815, he married Caroline Friederike Reinhardt, sister of his friend Georg Andreas Reimer's wife. He had seven children with her, including the historian Ernst Ludwig Dümmler. Dümmler's publishing activities were varied. In 1819 he published The Life and Opinions of the Tomcat Murr by E. T. A. Hoffmann. To a certain extent, the publishing company specialized in comparative linguistics and published the writings of the Prussian Academy of Sciences on commission.

From 1821, Ferdinand Dümmler was first elected as a deputy city councilor and then repeatedly as a member of the Berlin city council. From 1842 until his death on March 15, 1846, he was an unpaid city councilor.

In 1916, Antonio Lehmann (1871–1941) moved the publishing business from Berlin to Kaiserstrasse street in Bonn and renamed it "Ferd. Dümmlers Verlag". Starting in 1949, the company had a logo designed by Heinrich Hussmann. The company was sold to H. Stam Verlag in Cologne in 1999.
