= Basilica of St. Lawrence, Enns =

Coordinates: 48°13′07″N 14°28′01″E

Basilica of St. Lawrence
- Basilika Sankt Laurenz
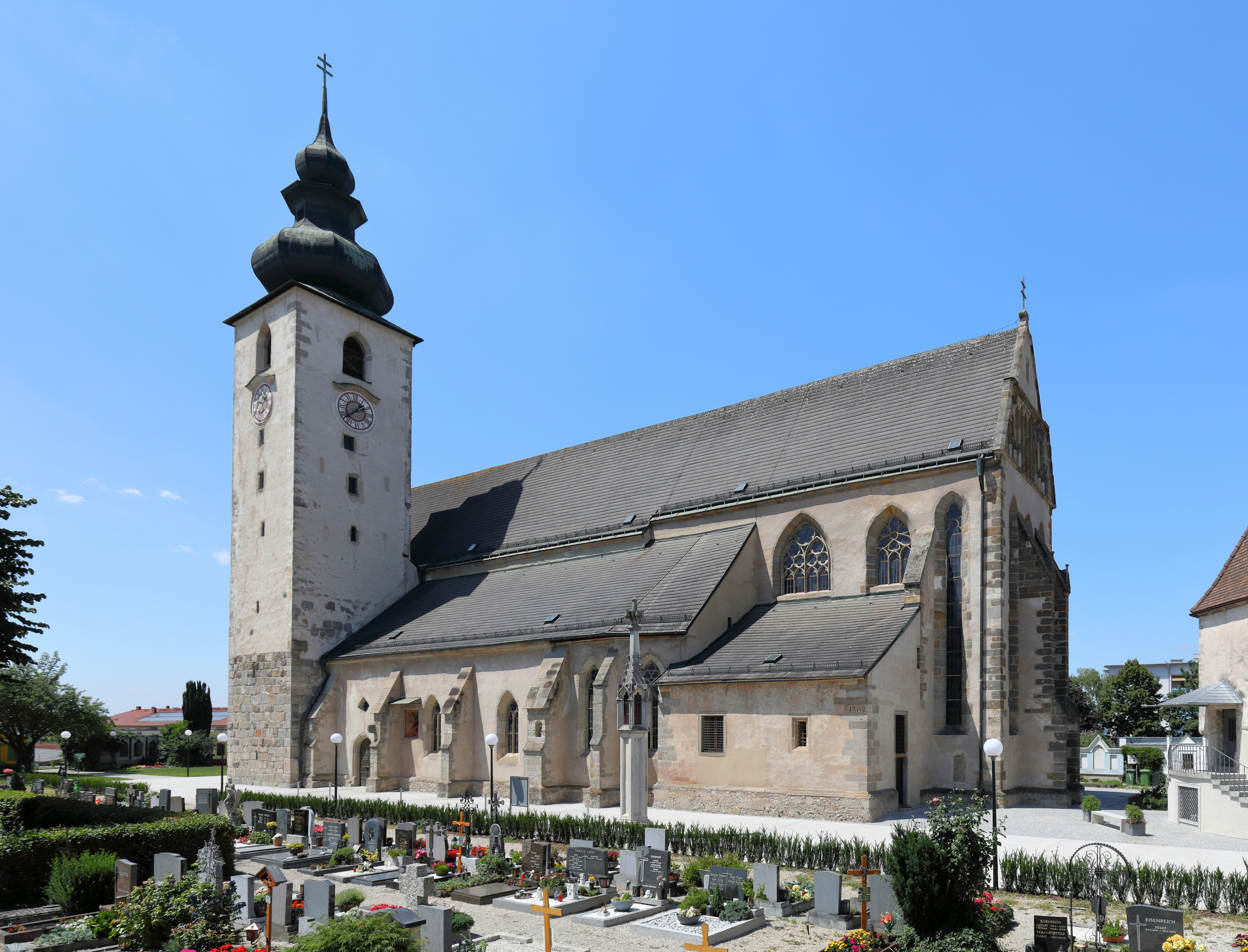
- Location: Enns
- Country: Austria
- Denomination: Roman Catholic Church

The Basilica of St. Lawrence (German: Basilika Sankt Laurenz) also called Former Cathedral of St. Lawrence is a Catholic church located in the district of Lorch, Enns city in Upper Austria, part of the European country of Austria. It was a cathedral church and is now a minor basilica. It belongs to Enns-Lorch deanery in the Diocese of Linz. The church is a listed building.

The Basilica of St. Lawrence rises above the remains of their Roman predecessors, which were discovered during archaeological excavations between 1960 and 1966. The oldest building - a Roman noble house - dating from the 2nd century AD. It was also built an early Christian church. There were several renovations and expansions until 1300, the existing church was built in Gothic style. At the end of archaeological research, the church was renovated and was one of the first churches in the country, whose design was affected by the spirit of the Second Vatican Council (1962–1965).

== See also ==
- Roman Catholicism in Austria

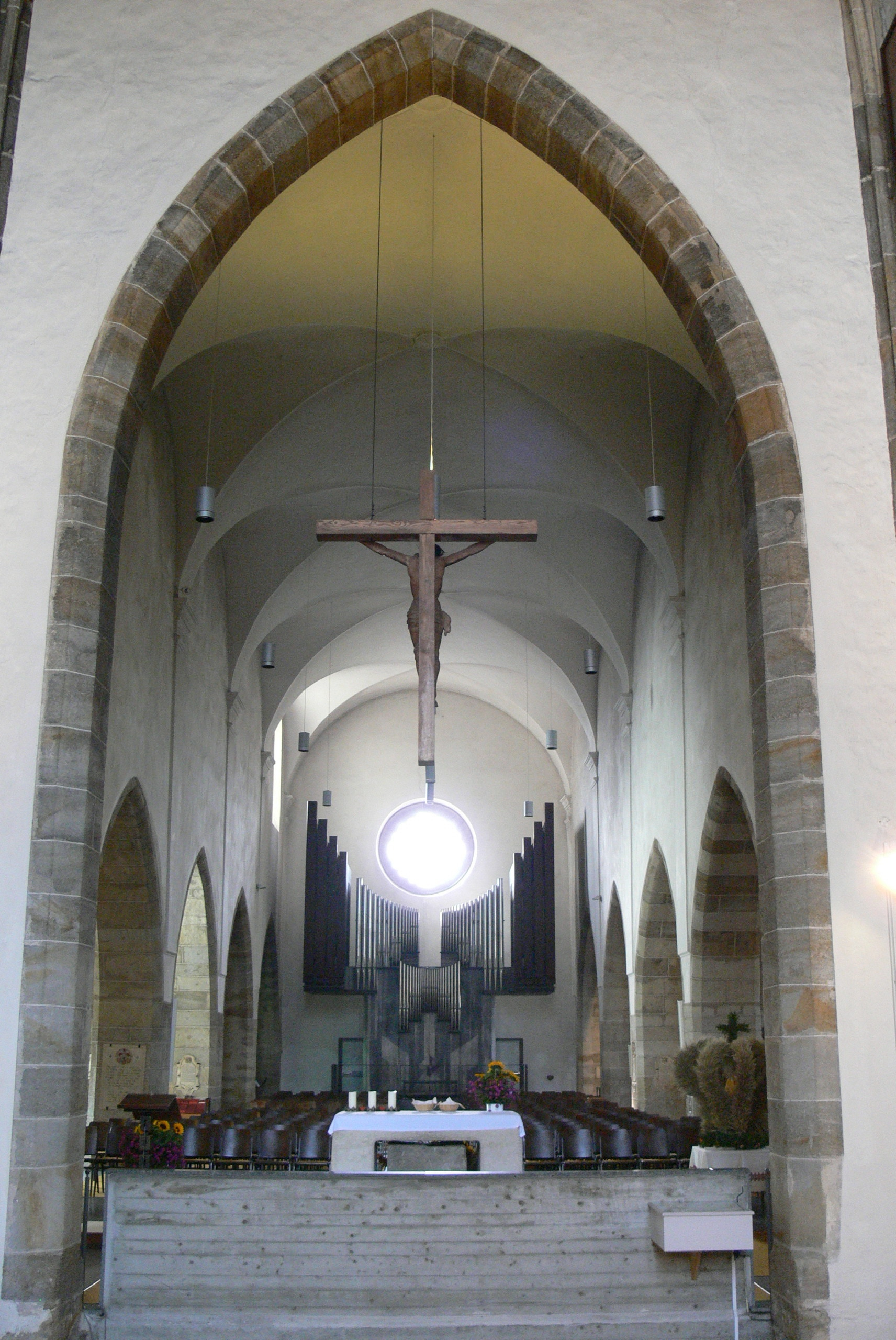
Internal view
