= Georg Ferdinand Dümmler =

German classicist (1859–1896)

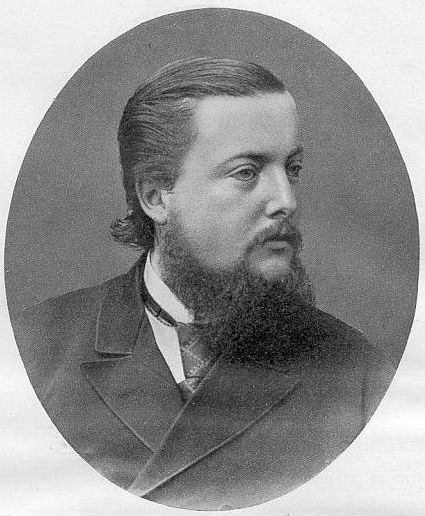
- c.1911
- Born: 10 February 1859; Saxony-Anhalt, German Confederation
- Died: 15 November 1896 (aged 37); Basel, Switzerland
- Father: Ernst Ludwig Dümmler

Georg Ferdinand Dümmler (10 February 1859 – 15 November 1896) was a German classical philologist and archaeologist born in Halle an der Saale. He was the son of historian Ernst Ludwig Dümmler (1830–1902).

He was a student at the Universities of Halle, Strassburg and Bonn. At Strassburg, he studied under Adolf Michaelis (1835–1910), and in Bonn, he had as instructors Franz Bücheler (1837–1908), Hermann Usener (1834–1905) and Reinhard Kekulé von Stradonitz (1839–1911). In 1882 he received his doctorate with a thesis on the philosopher Antisthenes.

Following graduation, he undertook archaeological research excursions through Italy, Greece, Cyprus and the Aegean Islands. From 1887 to 1890, he was a lecturer at the University of Giessen, and afterwards was a professor of philology and archaeology at the University of Basel. In 1889 he published Akademika. Beiträge zur Litteraturgeschichte der sokratischen Schulen ("Academica, contributions to the literary history of the Socratic schools").

Dümmler died of an illness in Basel on 15 November 1896 at the age of 37.
