= Rudolf Köpke =

German historian (1813-1870)

Rudolf Köpke (23 August 1813 – 10 June 1870) was a German historian born in Königsberg.

== Biography ==
From 1832 he studied theology in Berlin, where his interest changed to history under the influence of Leopold von Ranke (1795–1886). With Georg Waitz (1813–1886), Wilhelm von Giesebrecht (1814–1889) and Siegfried Hirsch (1816–1860), he was an early member of the so-called "Ranke school" of historians.

From 1838 to 1842, he taught classes at the Joachimsthal Gymnasium in Berlin and eventually became associated with the Monumenta Germaniae Historica. From 1850 to 1867, he taught history classes at the Kriegsakademie (War Academy of Berlin). He received the title of associate professor in 1856.

During the March Revolution of 1848, he was an advocate for German unity, publishing a series of articles calling for the end of German Kleinstaaterei.

== Literary works ==
Among Köpke's written works was a highly regarded two-volume biography of poet Ludwig Tieck (1773–1853), published in 1855 with the title of "Ludwig Tieck. Erinnerungen aus dem Leben des Dichters nach dessen mündlichen und schriftlichen Mittheilungen". Other noted works by Köpke include:

- Die Anfänge des Königtums bei den Goten (The beginnings of the kingdom during the Goths), (1859).
- Widukind von Korvei (Widukind of Corvey), (1867).
- Hrotsuit von Gandersheim (Hrotsvitha of Gandersheim, (1869).
- Die Gründung der Friedrich Wilhelms-Universität zu Berlin (The founding of Friedrich Wilhelm University in Berlin), (1860).
- Kaiser Otto der Große (Emperor Otto the Great); with Ernst Dümmler (1876).
