= Pilgrim (bishop of Passau) =

Pilgrim (or Piligrim, Pilegrinus, Peregrinus; died 20 May 991) was Bishop of Passau. Pilgrim was ambitious, but also concerned with the Christianization of Hungary.

== Life ==
He was educated at the Benedictine Niederaltaich Abbey, and was made bishop in 971. To him are attributed some, if not all, of the Forgeries of Lorch. These are a series of documents, especially papal bulls of Pope Symmachus, Pope Eugene II, Pope Leo VII, and Pope Agapetus II, fabricated to prove that Passau was a continuation of a former archdiocese of Lorch. By these he attempted to obtain from Benedict VI the elevation of Passau to an archdiocese, the re-erection of those dioceses in Pannonia and Mœsia which had been suffragans of Lorch, and the pallium for himself. There is extant an alleged Bull of Benedict VI granting Pilgrim's demands; but this is also the work of Pilgrim, possibly a document drawn up for the papal signature, which it never received.

Pilgrim converted numerous pagans in Hungary. He built many schools and churches, restored the Rule of St. Benedict in Niederaltaich, transferred the relics of Maximilian of Tebessa from Altötting to Passau, and held synods (983–991) at Ennsburg (Lorch), Mautern an der Donau, and Mistelbach. In the Nibelungenlied he is lauded as a contemporary of the heroes of that epic.
