= Enns (town) =

- Municipality
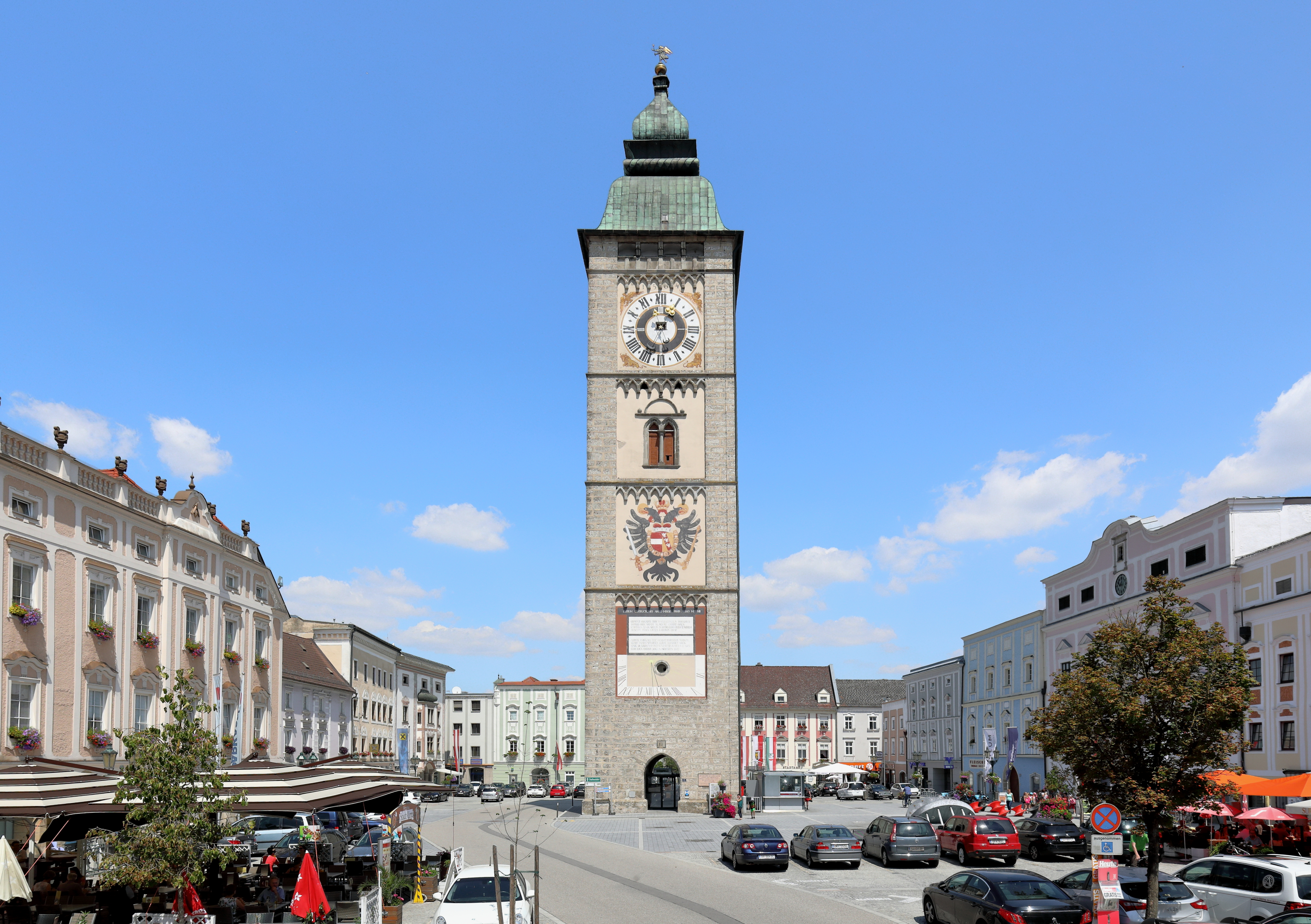
- Main square with the tower

- Coat of arms

- Location within Austria
- Coordinates: 48°13′0″N 14°28′30″E
- Country: Austria
- State: Upper Austria
- District: Linz-Land

Government
  - Mayor: Christian Deleja-Hotko (SPÖ)

Area
  - Total: 33.29 km^{2} (12.85 sq mi)
- Elevation: 281 m (922 ft)

Population (2018-01-01)
  - Total: 11,937
  - Density: 358.6/km^{2} (928.7/sq mi)
- Time zone: UTC+1 (CET)
  - Summer (DST): UTC+2 (CEST)
- Postal code: 4470
- Area code: 07223
- Vehicle registration: LL
- Website: www.enns.at www.enns.or.at

Enns (German pronunciation: [ɛns]) is a town in the Austrian state of Upper Austria on the river Enns, which forms the border with the state of Lower Austria.

Enns was one of the first places in Austria to receive town rights. Its charter dates to 22 April 1212; the document is displayed at the local museum. The date is also depicted on the municipal tower, the landmark of Enns.

== Geography ==
Enns extends for 7.5 km from north to south and 8.6 km from west to east. Its total area is 34.3 km^{2}, of which 12.8% are covered with forest, and 64.1% are used for agriculture.

The municipality can be subdivided into the districts of Einsiedl, Enghagen, Enghagen am Tabor, Enns, Ental, Erlengraben, Hiesendorf, Kottingrat, Kristein, Kronau, Lorch, Moos, Rabenberg and Volkersdorf.

== History ==
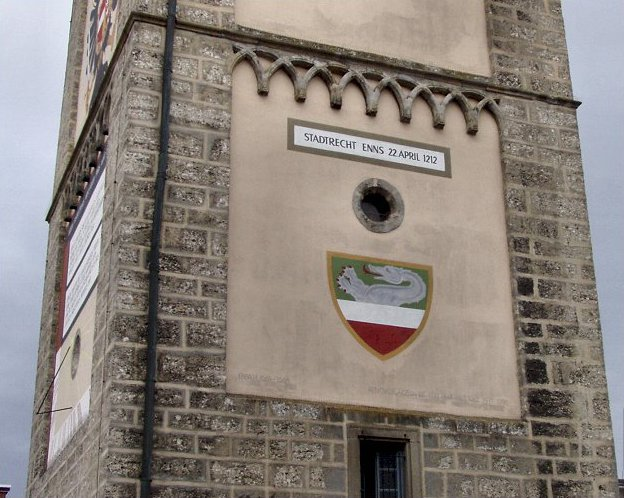
Detail of the belfry (1564-1568).

The first settlements in the area of the mouth of the Enns river to the Danube date back to 4,000 years ago. Celts settled the land around 400 BC. Their kingdom of Noricum was incorporated into the Roman Empire in 15 BC and was designated as a Roman province under the reign of Emperor Claudius in AD 45.

In the second and third century, the Roman camp of Lauriacum, in which up to 6,000 soldiers were stationed, was located on the site of modern Enns. The adjacent settlement (today: Lorch) received the privileges of a municipium in 212 from Emperor Caracalla. At that time about 30,000 people lived here. During the Diocletian Persecution of Christians, a commander of the Roman army, Saint Florian, died as a martyr at Lauriacum on 4 May 304, when he was drowned in the Enns river. Only nine years later, the Emperor Constantine I proclaimed religious tolerance with the Edict of Milan. About 370, an Early Christian basilica was built on the remains of a Jupiter temple and Lauriacum was the see of a bishop until 488. The present Basilica of St. Lawrence at Lorch was built in 1344 on the foundations of the old church

About 900, the Enisiburg fortress, later Ennsegg Castle, was built on the Georgenberg hill to serve as a protective fortress against Magyar invasions. The surrounding settlement prospered from the 12th century onwards, when Ottokar II, Margrave of Styria established a market here. In 1186 the Georgenberg Pact was signed, an inheritance contract between Ottokar IV, Duke of Styria, who lacked a male heir, and the Babenberg duke of Austria, Leopold V. Following the death of Ottokar IV in 1192, his Duchy of Styria — then significantly bigger than the contemporary state, reaching from present day Slovenia to Upper Austria — fell to the House of Babenberg. Thus, Enns became Austrian.

As Leopold VI, Duke of Austria, endowed Enns with town privileges in 1212, it is now considered Austria's oldest town (apart from the Roman municipal status). The landmark of Enns, the belfry (municipal tower) on the Main Square, was erected between 1564 and 1568 as a bell tower, watch and clock tower during the reign of emperor Maximilian II.

=== Jews ===
Jewish moneylending in Enns is mentioned by a 1393 contract.

Leopold Löw theorized that the Yiddish term "schlemiel" (fool) originated in mockery of Shlomiel of Enns, a 14th-century rabbi. According to Yaakov Levi Moelin (c. 1365–1427), "Shlomiel of Enns once went to study abroad, and his wife gave birth eleven months later. But all agree that she did not cuckold him, given her great piety." Moelin also recounts that Shlomiel was in mourning one Purim. The Talmud says that a woman can delay giving birth for twelve months if her husband goes away on a trip.

In 1420, a certain Jew in Enns named Israel (perhaps the "Isserlein of Enns" recorded as a Vienna homeowner) was accused of desecrating a host. After obtaining confessions through torture, Albert II seized all Jewish property in Austria and redistributed it to Christians. He then imprisoned, tortured, and forcibly converted the roughly 2,000 Jews of Austria. Those who did not convert, commit suicide, or escape (some 90 men and 120 women) were burned at the stake on 12 March 1421.

== Population ==
Historical population
Year	Pop.	±%
1869	5,624	—
1880	5,733	+1.9%
1890	6,001	+4.7%
1900	5,552	−7.5%
1910	5,799	+4.4%
1923	5,630	−2.9%
1934	6,679	+18.6%
1939	7,419	+11.1%
1951	8,446	+13.8%
1961	8,919	+5.6%
1971	9,678	+8.5%
1981	9,728	+0.5%
1991	10,190	+4.7%
2001	10,611	+4.1%
2011	11,275	+6.3%

== Politics ==
=== Municipal council ===
The municipal council consists of 37 members. Since the 2003 elections, party representation on the council has been as follows:

- 21 Social Democratic Party of Austria
- 12 Austrian People's Party
- 3 Austrian Green Party
- 1 Freedom Party of Austria

The current mayor is Christian Deleja-Hotko, a Social Democrat.

=== Population ===
In 1991, Enns had 10,192 inhabitants according to the census. The number grew to 10,639 in the census of 2001.
