= Maximilian of Lorch =

Saint Maximilian
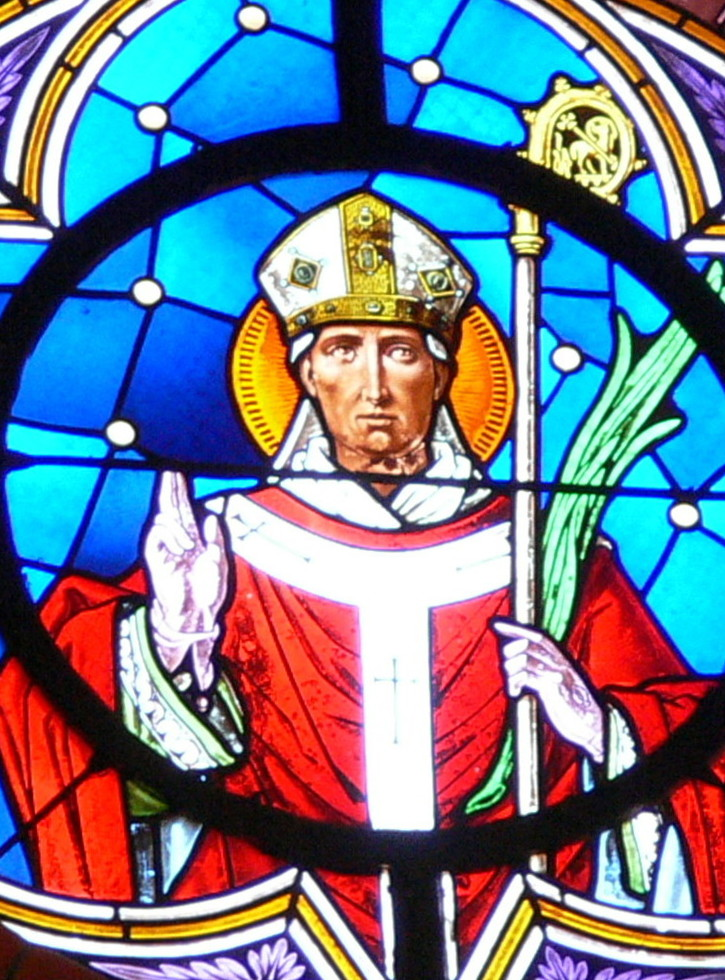
- Depiction of Maximilian of Lorch on a vitrail of the parish church in Aigen, Upper Austria.

Bishop of Lorch
- Born: Celeia
- Died: 288
- Cause of death: Decapitation
- Venerated in: Catholic Church
- Feast: 12 October (29 October)

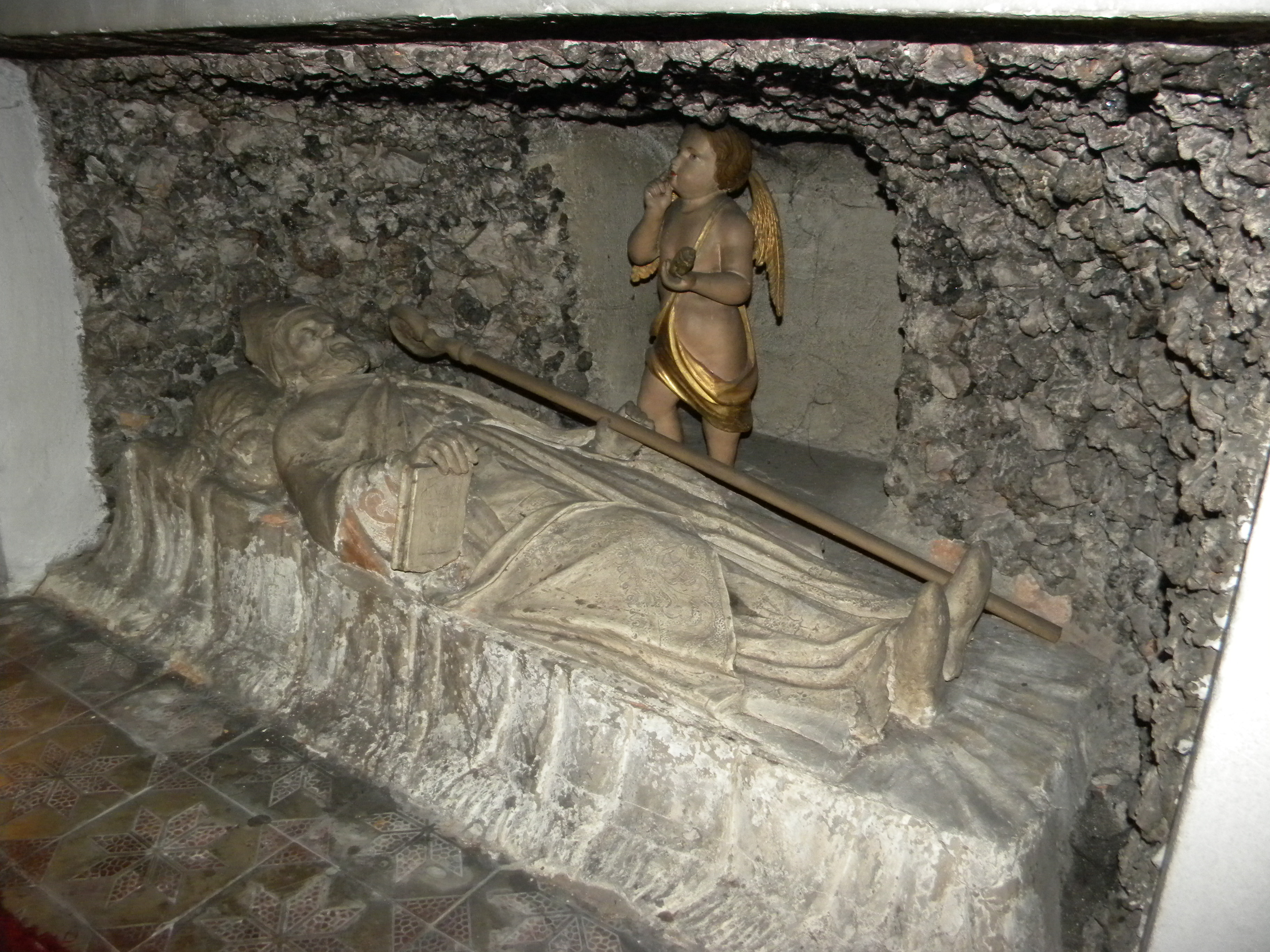
Grave of Saint Maximilian in Celje, Slovenia

Saint Maximilian of Lorch or Saint Maximilian of Celeia (Latin: Maximilianus, Slovene: Maksimilijan Celjski, German Maximilian von Lorch; died 12 October 288) was a Catholic bishop and missionary in the Roman province of Noricum. He was martyred in AD 288.

== Life ==
Maximilian was born in Celeia in the Roman province of Noricum (in present-day Slovenia). As an adult, he made a pilgrimage to Rome. Pope Sixtus II sent him to Lauriacum (Lorch) in the Roman province of Noricum, where he worked as a missionary during the latter half of the third century. He founded the church of Lorch. Maximilian was beheaded by the Roman Prefect of Emperor Numerian after refusing to abandon Christianity and sacrifice to the pagan gods.

== Devotion ==
He is remembered on 12 October (and in some locations on 29 October).

His cult dates at least from the 7th century in Bavaria and Salzburg. In that century, Saint Rupert built a church in his honour at Bischofshofen in the Salzach valley, and brought his relics there. They were later transferred to Passau in 985.

Maximilian's Day (Maksimilijanov dan) is being celebrated in Celje. City park in Celje is named after him.
