= Lorch, Austria =

District of Linz-Land in Upper Austria

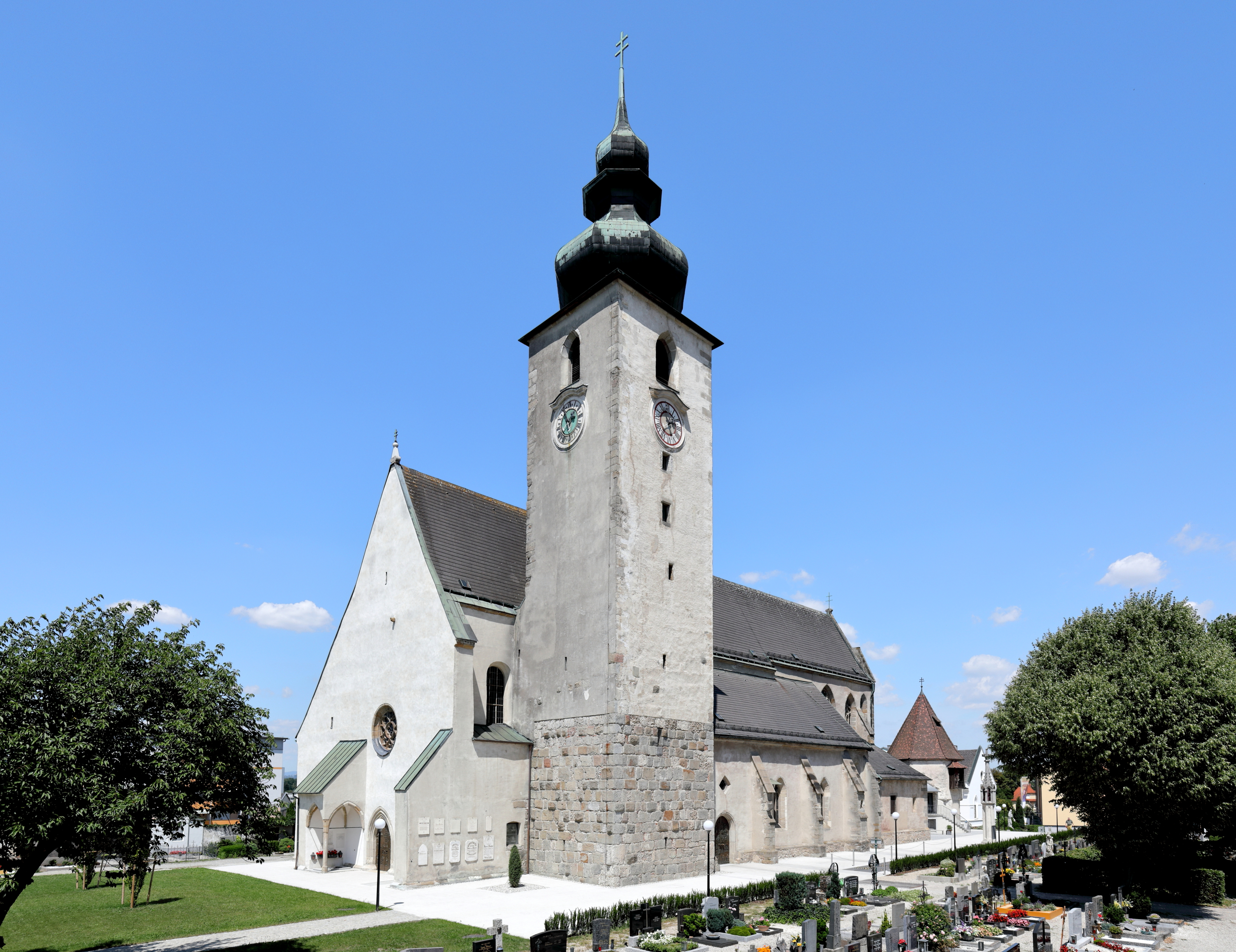
Basilika St. Laurenz

Lorch (Austrian German pronunciation: [lɔrç]) is a district of the city of Enns in the district of Linz-Land in Upper Austria. It is at 48°13′0″N, 14°28′30″E. and developed out of the Roman town of Lauriacum.

Today it is incorporated into Enns, Austria.
