= Curti (surname) =

Curti is an Italian surname that may refer to the following notable people:

- Augusto Curti (born 1978), Italian politician
- Aldo Curti (footballer), Italian footballer
- Camille Curti (born 1999), French acrobatic gymnast.
- Carlo Curti, Italian-American musician, composer, conductor
- Carlo Curti (Bolognese composer) (1807–1872), Italian cellist, educator and composer
- Carlos Maldonado Curti (born 1963), Chilean politician and lawyer
- César Curti (born 1987), Brazilian model and male pageant winner
- Enrique Curti (1899–1992), Chilean civil engineer and conservative politician
- Franz Curti (1854–1898), Swiss-German opera composer
- Girolamo Curti (1575–1632), Italian painter
- Merle Curti (1897–1996), American historian
- Nives Curti (born 1969), Italian long-distance runner and mountain runner
- Pier-Ambrogio Curti (1819–1899), Italian writer, historian, lawyer, and politician
- William Curti, 14th-century cardinal
