= List of The Amazing Race (Latin American TV series) contestants =

This is a list of contestants who have appeared on the television series, The Amazing Race, previously known as The Amazing Race en Discovery Channel. Contestants with a pre-existing relationship form a team and race across Latin America against other teams to claim a grand prize of US$250,000. In total, 110 contestants have appeared in the series.

== Contestants ==
The presented information was accurate at the time of filming.

Name	Age	Hometown	Season	Finish
Ariel Saravia	26	Rosario, Argentina	Season 1	11th
Nora Saravia	33	Rosario, Argentina	Season 1	11th
Guillermo Villarreal	33	Playa del Carmen, Mexico	Season 1	10th
Gabriel Villarreal	33	Playa del Carmen, Mexico	Season 1	10th
Ricardo Acevedo	60	Panama City, Panama	Season 1	9th
Adriana Acevedo	26	Panama City, Panama	Season 1	9th
Mario Torres	38	Bucaramanga, Colombia	Season 1	8th
Melissa Figueredo	24	Bucaramanga, Colombia	Season 1	8th
Miguel Kurmen	26	Bogotá, Colombia	Season 1	7th
Diego Chaustre	28	Bogotá, Colombia	Season 1	7th
Casilda Creixell	55	Mexico City, Mexico	Season 1	6th
Casilda Pérez	30	Mexico City, Mexico	Season 1	6th
Rodrigo Alegro	29	São Paulo, Brazil	Season 1	5th
Anna Arestivo	28	São Paulo, Brazil	Season 1	5th
Daniel Mastroiano	27	Araraquara, Brazil	Season 1	4th
Carlos Tavares	29	Araraquara, Brazil	Season 1	4th
Fernanda "Ferna" Guzmán	28	Santiago, Chile	Season 1	3rd
Francisca "Fran" Coombs	28	Santiago, Chile	Season 1	3rd
Daniel España	55	Caracas, Venezuela	Season 1	2nd
David Galavis	23	Caracas, Venezuela	Season 1	2nd
Tamara Reichelt	29	Buenos Aires, Argentina	Season 1	1st
Matías Franchini	35	Buenos Aires, Argentina	Season 1	1st
Susy Rotstain	44	Lima, Peru	Season 2	11th
Stefany Porudominsky	23	Lima, Peru	Season 2	11th
Mariana Moreno	39	Petrópolis, Brazil^{1}	Season 2	10th
Mauricio Moreno	42	Concepción, Chile	Season 2	10th
Roger Saliba	29	Puerto Ordaz, Venezuela	Season 2	9th
Omar Guedez	26	Puerto Ordaz, Venezuela	Season 2	9th
Javier Báez	36	La Romana, Dominican Republic	Season 2	8th
Jelkin Rijo	29	La Romana, Dominican Republic	Season 2	8th
Edison J. Perezgomez	56	Saltillo, Mexico	Season 2	7th
Edison M. Perezgomez	26	Saltillo, Mexico	Season 2	7th
Marietta Acosta	23	Barranquilla, Colombia	Season 2	6th
José Cárdenas	27	Barranquilla, Colombia	Season 2	6th
Esteban Portela	35	Bogotá, Colombia	Season 2	5th
Marisol Márquez	33	Bogotá, Colombia	Season 2	5th
Vínicius Lemos	25	Rio de Janeiro, Brazil	Season 2	4th
Guilherme Nunes	30	Rio de Janeiro, Brazil	Season 2	4th
Marlene Zichy	39	Buenos Aires, Argentina	Season 2	3rd
Aleandra Scafati	41	Buenos Aires, Argentina	Season 2	3rd
Liliana "Lili" Cantú	36	Monterrey, Mexico	Season 2	2nd
Antonio "Toño" Varas	38	Monterrey, Mexico	Season 2	2nd
Mauricio Coarasa	36	Mexico City, Mexico	Season 2	1st
Carlos Coarasa	39	Mexico City, Mexico	Season 2	1st
Alejandra "Ale" Fundaro	49	Córdoba, Argentina	Season 3	11th
Ezequiel "Eze" Ball	48	Córdoba, Argentina	Season 3	11th
Verónica "Vero" Alvarado	24	Cagua, Venezuela	Season 3	10th
Gabriela "Gaba" Cardozo	24	Turmero, Venezuela	Season 3	10th
Mónica Ramos	45	Guadalajara, Mexico	Season 3	9th
Rosa "Rosy" Aragón	47	Guadalajara, Mexico	Season 3	9th
Juan "Pablo" Rivera	33	Cuenca, Ecuador	Season 3	8th
Leonor "Rosario" Vegas	40	Loja, Ecuador	Season 3	8th
Andrea "Andre" Cino	21	Lima, Peru	Season 3	7th
Nicholas "Nico" Cino	26	Lima, Peru	Season 3	7th
José Varela	31	San José, Costa Rica	Season 3	6th
Marisol Ortiz	30	San José, Costa Rica	Season 3	6th
María Victoria "Toya" Montoya	29	Bogotá, Colombia	Season 3	5th
Juan del Mar Iglesias	40	Bogotá, Colombia	Season 3	5th
Ricardo "Rick" Bagarrán	40	Puerto Vallarta, Mexico	Season 3	4th
Kathia "Kathy" Farah	36	Puerto Vallarta, Mexico	Season 3	4th
Maximiliano "Maxi" Ottaviani	26	Buenos Aires, Argentina	Season 3	3rd
Demian "Demi" Bellido	25	Buenos Aires, Argentina	Season 3	3rd
Felipe Castro	33	Bogotá, Colombia	Season 3	2nd
Alejandro Soler	34	Bogotá, Colombia	Season 3	2nd
Nicolás Brain	26	Santiago, Chile	Season 3	1st
Cristóbal Brain	26	Santiago, Chile	Season 3	1st
Cintia "Ci" de Franco	25	Campinas, SP	Season 4	11th
Luiza "Lu" de Franco	25	Campinas, SP	Season 4	11th
Gilmar "Billy" Schlossmacher	49	São Paulo, SP	Season 4	10th
Gilbert "Gean" Schlossmacher	48	São Paulo, SP	Season 4	10th
Maria Cecília "Ciça" Cardoso	57	Goiânia, GO	Season 4	9th
José Carlos "Zezão" Cardoso	26	Goiânia, GO	Season 4	9th
Harã Lemes	29	São Paulo, SP	Season 4	8th
Marília "Gabriela" David	29	São Paulo, SP	Season 4	8th
Luiz "Fuzetti" Fuzetti	54	Embu das Artes, SP	Season 4	7th
Luiz "Nando" Cardim	30	Embu das Artes, SP	Season 4	7th
Cainã Nagano	22	Brasília, DF	Season 4	6th
Fernanda Chateaubriand	22	Brasília, DF	Season 4	6th
Ana Paula Caetano	35	Brasília, DF	Season 4	5th
Renata Faria	33	Brasília, DF	Season 4	5th
Renan Amaral	26	Rio de Janeiro, RJ	Season 4	4th
Françoise "Fran" Mattoso	27	Rio de Janeiro, RJ	Season 4	4th
Eduardo "Edu" Braga y García	25	Uberlândia, MG	Season 4	3rd
Ricardo "Rick" Braga y García	29	Uberlândia, MG	Season 4	3rd
Ferdinei "Ferds" Martins	32	São Paulo, SP	Season 4	2nd
Fernando "Fer" Ruas	32	São Paulo, SP	Season 4	2nd
Daniel Belém	25	Ribeirão Preto, SP	Season 4	1st
César Curti	25	São Paulo, SP	Season 4	1st
Ariana "Ari" Figueroa	26	Mexico City, Mexico	Season 5	11th
Ramón "Ra" Figueroa	32	Mexico City, Mexico	Season 5	11th
Filippo Puccio	42	Ocumare del Tuy, Venezuela	Season 5	10th
Eddy Díaz	47	Maracaibo, Venezuela	Season 5	10th
Débora Cunha	30	São Paulo, Brazil	Season 5	9th
Renata Kimura	26	São Paulo, Brazil	Season 5	9th
Juan "Juanjo" López	38	Guatemala City, Guatemala	Season 5	8th
Gilberto "Beto" Ortega	36	Mexico City, Mexico	Season 5	8th
Astrid Velásquez	34	Medellín, Colombia	Season 5	7th
Alejandra "Aleja" Velásquez	28	Medellín, Colombia	Season 5	7th
Evelyn Cristopher	39	Bogotá, Colombia	Season 5	6th
Jorge Avellaneda	30	Bogotá, Colombia	Season 5	6th
Jessica Manco	27	Caracas, Venezuela	Season 5	5th
Carelb "Michelle" Herrera	30	Caracas, Venezuela	Season 5	5th
Manfred Céspedes	25	Alajuela, Costa Rica	Season 5	4th
Pierre Monney	27	San José, Costa Rica^{2}	Season 5	4th
Karina Cordobés	24	Buenos Aires, Argentina	Season 5	3rd
Braian Torres	26	Buenos Aires, Argentina	Season 5	3rd
Darío Greni	38	Canelones, Uruguay	Season 5	2nd
Esther Martínez	41	Canelones, Uruguay	Season 5	2nd
Ezequiel Sapochnik	35	Chubut, Argentina	Season 5	1st
Lucas "Tobías" de la Barra	34	Santa Rosa, Argentina	Season 5	1st
Ana Pérez	26	Caracas, Venezuela	Season 6	11th
Alexander "Vantroy" Sánchez	36	Caracas, Venezuela	Season 6	11th
Carlos Alonso	28	Valencia, Venezuela	Season 6	10th
Orlando Betancourt	21	Mérida, Venezuela	Season 6	10th
Claudia "Audi" Velázquez Macías	23	Cuernavaca, Mexico	Season 6	9th
David Andres	25	Cuernavaca, Mexico	Season 6	9th
Clara Arauz	25	Buenos Aires, Argentina	Season 6	8th
Delfina Arauz	28	Buenos Aires, Argentina	Season 6	8th
Sonia Parada	26	Bogotá, Colombia	Season 6	7th
Gabriel Camero Gartner	25	Bogotá, Colombia	Season 6	7th
Estefanía "Stefanía" Marticorena	26	Coquimbo, Chile	Season 6	6th
Felipe Galleguillos Céspedes	38	Coquimbo, Chile	Season 6	6th
Martín Suarez	29	Santa Marta, Colombia	Season 6	5th
Jenny Machado	26	Santa Marta, Colombia	Season 6	5th
Christian Altamirano	26	Guayaquil, Ecuador	Season 6	4th
Dina Muñoz	23	Guayaquil, Ecuador	Season 6	4th
Juan Molina	51	Guadalajara, Mexico	Season 6	3rd
Cecilia Molina	24	Guadalajara, Mexico	Season 6	3rd
Javier Rodriguez	30	San Fernando, Argentina	Season 6	2nd
Nicolas Podestá	30	Buenos Aires, Argentina	Season 6	2nd
Giovanni López	44	Guayaquil, Ecuador	Season 6	1st
Juan Carlos Estrada	45	Guayaquil, Ecuador	Season 6	1st

^{1} Originally from Chile.
^{2} Originally from the United States.

== See also ==
List of The Amazing Race (Latin America) winners
