= Kurti =

Kurti may refer to:

== People ==
- Kurti (king) (8th century BC), Neo-Hittite king of Atuna
- Albin Kurti (born 1975), Kosovo Albanian politician
- Baca Kurti (1807–1881), Albanian nationalist leader
- Çezar Kurti (1935–2013), Albanian translator
- Donat Kurti (1903–1983), Albanian Catholic cleric, scholar and folklorist
- Lec Kurti (fl. 1920s), Albanian ambassador to Greece, composer and writer
- Nicholas Kurti (1908–1998), Hungarian-born British physicist and molecular gastronomist
- Palokë Kurti (1858–1920), Albanian composer
- Shtjefën Kurti (1898–1971), Albanian Catholic cleric and martyr
- Tinka Kurti (born 1932), Albanian actress

== Places ==
- Kurti, Iran, a village in West Azerbaijan Province, Iran
- Kurti, Sudan a town in Sudan
- Kurti, Azad Kashmir, a small village near Kotli District of Azad Kashmir, Pakistan
- Kurti, Tripura, an assembly constituency under Tripura East (Lok Sabha constituency), India

== Other uses ==
- 132798 Kürti, a minor planet
- Kurti & Doyle, a British scriptwriting team
- Kurti language, an Austronesian language spoken in Papua New Guinea
- Kurti top, upper garments worn in South Asia

== See also ==
- Curti (disambiguation)
- Kurtis (disambiguation)
