= Aldo (given name) =

Aldo is a male given name, commonly found in Italy. People named Aldo include:

== People ==
=== Given name ===
- Aldo Agroppi (1944–2025), Italian footballer and football coach
- John Aldridge (born 1958), English-born Irish footballer nicknamed Aldo
- Aldo Andretti (1940–2020), American racing driver and entrepreneur
- Aldo Aniasi (1921–2005), Italian politician
- Aldo Baglio (born 1958), Italian comedian and film actor
- Aldo Bensadoun (born 1939), Canadian businessman and philanthropist
- Aldo Bentini (born 1948), Italian boxer
- Aldo Bertocco (1911–1990), French racing cyclist
- Aldo Bozzi (1909–1987), Italian lawyer and politician
- Aldo Brancher (born 1943), Italian politician
- Aldo Busi (born 1948), Italian writer
- Aldo Buzzi (1910–2009), Italian author and architect
- Aldo Cacioppo (1944–2026), Italian basketball player and coach
- Aldo Campatelli (1919–1984), Italian football manager and player
- Aldo Carosi (born 1951), Italian judge
- Aldo Ciccolini (1925–2015), Italian and French pianist
- Aldo Clementi (1925–2011), Italian composer
- Aldo Curti, Italian professional football player
- Aldo Donelli (1907–1994), American football and soccer player
- Aldo Giuffrè (1924–2010), Italian film actor and comedian
- Aldo Gucci (1905–1990), Italian businessman and Chairman of Gucci
- Aldo Lado (1934–2023), Italian film director and screenwriter
- Aldo Leopold (1887–1948), American ecologist, forester, and environmentalist
- Aldo Moro (1916–1978), murdered Italian prime minister
- Aldo Moser (1934–2020), Italian racing cyclist
- Aldo Nova (born 1956), Canadian musician
- Aldo Novarese (1920–1995), Italian typographer
- Aldo Oviglio (1873–1942), Italian lawyer and politician
- Aldo Palazzeschi (1885–1974), Italian poet
- Aldo Ray (1926–1991), American actor
- Aldo Richins (1910–1995), Mexican player in American football
- Aldo Rossi (1931–1997), Italian architect
- Aldo Sambrell, a European actor also known as Alfred Sanchez Bell
- Aldo Stellita (1947–1998), Italian musician and bassist
- Aldo Suurväli (born 1967), Estonian swimmer
- Aldo van den Berg (born 1967), South African cricketer
- Aldo Zadrima (born 1948), Albanian chess player
- Aldus Manutius or Aldo Manuzio (died 1515), Italian humanist scholar, printer and publisher

=== Middle name ===
- José Aldo (born 1986), Brazilian mixed martial artist

== Characters ==
- Aldo, a 2007 character in the video game Summon Night: Twin Age
- Aldo, one of the two protagonists from the animated television series Sitting Ducks
- Aldo (Planet of the Apes), a gorilla character in the Planet of the Apes series of movies
- Aldo, the main character in the Italian comic strip Venerdì 12
- Aldo, a minor character in the television series Lost
- Aldo Burrows, a character from the television series Prison Break
- Aldo Kelrast, a character from the comic strip Mary Worth
- Aldo Raine, a character from the film Inglourious Basterds
- Aldo Trapani, the main character of The Godfather: The Game
- Aldo, a character in Story Teller
- Aldo, the protagonist of the game Another Eden: The Cat Beyond Time And Space
