= Cezar =

Cezar, Cézar, or Çezar may refer to:

- Cezar (footballer, born 1986), Brazilian football midfielder Roberto Cezar Lima Acunha
- Cezar Augusto (born 1986), Brazilian former footballer
- Cezar Bădiță (born 1979), Romanian medley swimmer
- Cezar Baltag (1937–1997), Romanian poet
- Cezar Bolliac (1813–1881), Wallachian and Romanian radical politician, amateur archaeologist, journalist and poet
- Cezar Crețu (born 2001), Romanian tennis player
- Cezar Drăgăniță (born 1954), Romanian handball player
- Cezar Ferreira (born 1985), Brazilian mixed martial artist
- Çezar Kurti (1935–2013), Albanian translator
- Cezar Lăzărescu (1923–1986), Romanian architect and urban planner
- Cezar Mateus (born 1961), American lutenist, composer and luthier
- Cezar Niculescu (1927–1981), Romanian basketball player
- Cezar Papacostea (1886–1936), Romanian classicist
- Cezar Petrescu (1892–1961), Romanian journalist, novelist and children's writer
