= Curti =

Curti may refer to:

- Curti, Campania, a town in Italy
- Curti, Goa, a town in Goa, India
- Curti (surname)
- Curti Zefhir, a light helicopter produced by Italian company Curti Aerospace

== See also ==
- Curtius (disambiguation)
- Kurti (disambiguation)
