= Burtis =

Burtis is a surname. Notable people with the surname include:

- Samuel Burtis Baker (1882–1967), American artist and teacher
- Thomson Burtis (1896–1971), American pulp fiction writer
- Warren Burtis (1848–1911), American baseball umpire

== See also ==
- Kurtis (disambiguation)
