= Aldo Cacioppo =

Italian basketball player and coach (1944–2026)

Personal information
- Born: 14 July 1944 Alcamo, Italy
- Died: 12 April 2026 (aged 81)

Career information
- Playing career: 1961–1962
- Position: Guard
- Coaching career: 1964–2012

Career history

Playing
- 1961–1962: US Palermo

Coaching
- 1964–1965: Vittorioso Palermo
- 1965–1971: US Palermo
- 1971–1979: FA Palermo
- 1999–2000: Verga Palermo (Technical Director)
- 2011–2012: Otium Palermo (Technical Director)

Aldo Cacioppo (14 July 1944 – 12 April 2026) was an Italian basketball player and coach.

== Biography ==
In the 1961–1962 season, he played for Cestistica Palermitana in the Serie A Second Division.

In 1964–65, he served as the coach of Polisportiva Vittorioso, which finished last in the men's Serie B. In 1965–66, he coached in Promozione and from 1966–67 onward in Serie B, he was the coach of the US Palermo women's team.

Cacioppo coached Frecce Azzurre Palermo in the 1978–79 season of the women's Serie A.

In 1999–2000, he was the technical director of Verga Palermo. He was named an honorary coach (allenatore benemerito) in 2011. In 2011–2012, he held the same position for Otium Palermo.

Cacioppo died on 12 April 2026, at the age of 81.

== Bibliography ==
- Massimiliano Mascolo (2016). Almanacco del basket al femminile (2nd ed.). J and J.
