= Kurtis =

Kurtis may refer to:

== People ==
- Bill Kurtis, American television journalist
- Frank Kurtis (1908–1987), American car-builder and founder of Kurtis Kraft
- Mesut Kurtis, Macedonian Islamic singer of Turkish descent
- Kurtis Conner, Canadian comedian and YouTuber
- Kurtis Rourke (born 2000), Canadian American football player
- Kurtis Rowe, New Zealand Rugby League player
- Kurtis Blow, American Rapper

== Fictional characters ==
- Kurtis Trent from the Tomb Raider: The Angel of Darkness game
- Kurtis, a recurring character in the Disgaea: Hour of Darkness and Disgaea 2: Cursed Memories games
- Kurtis Stryker from the Mortal Kombat series of video games

== See also ==
- Curtis (disambiguation)
- Kurti (disambiguation)
- Kurtis (animation studio), an animation studio from J.J. Villard that has now been renamed to "Villard Film".
