= The Amazing Race 4 (Latin American season) =

Season of television series

- Season 4
- Presented by: Paulo Zulu
- No. of teams: 11
- Winners: Daniel Belém & César Curti
- No. of legs: 12
- Distance traveled: 13,300 km (8,300 mi)
- No. of episodes: 13

Release
- Original network: Space
- Original release: 7 October – 23 December 2012

Additional information
- Filming dates: 28 July – 16 August 2012

Series chronology
- ← Previous; Season 3 Next → Season 5

The Amazing Race 4, also known as The Amazing Race: Edição Brasil (Brazilian Portuguese pronunciation: [edʒiˈsɐ̃w bɾaˈziw]; English: The Amazing Race: Brazilian Edition) and The Amazing Race on Space 2, is the fourth installment of the Latin American reality television game show The Amazing Race. Edição Brasil is the second season to be aired on the channel, Space, in association with Disney Media Networks Latin America. It featured eleven teams of two, with a pre-existing relationship, in a race across Latin America to win US$250,000.

On July 13, 2012, Brazilian model and actor Paulo Zulu was announced as the new host of the show, replacing Harris Whitbeck. The show premiered with a two-hour episode on Space Brazil on 7 October 2012 at 7:00 p.m. (UTC-3) and for the rest of Latin America on 9 October 2012 at 9:00 p.m. (UTC-3). The season finale aired on Space Brazil on 23 December 2012 at 7:00 p.m. (UTC-3) and for the rest of Latin America on 25 December 2012 at 9:00 p.m. (UTC-3).

Friends from Ribeirão Preto Daniel Belém and César Curti were the winners of this season.

== Production ==
=== Development and filming ===
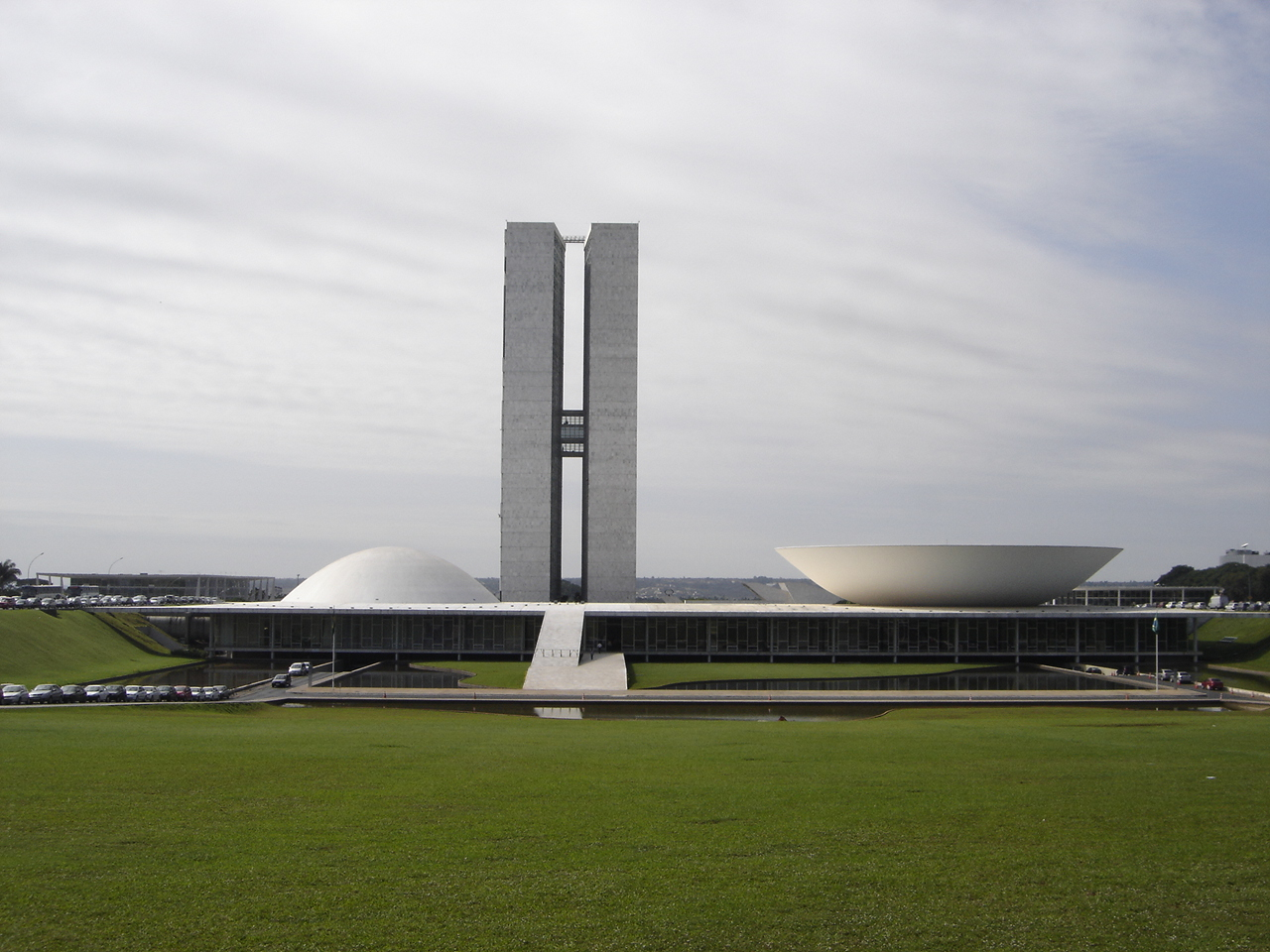
The season's Starting Line was at the National Congress in the Monumental Axis, Brasília, Brazil.

Space greenlit the fourth season of the series in late December 2011. Filming for this fourth season took place from 28 July 2012 to 16 August 2012. The show was broadcast in high-definition television on Space HD.

Filming for the fourth season lasted for 22 days and covered nearly 13,300 km (8,300 miles). This fourth season spanned three countries in one continent, all of them previously visited (Bolivia, Brazil and Peru).

This was the first Latin American season to not feature a Fast Forward or a Yield.

None of the teams were present at the Finish Line.

=== Casting ===
Applications for this season were opened only for Brazilians on 31 December 2011 and closed on 1 March 2012.

=== Marketing ===
Sponsors for this season are BlackBerry, PromPeru, OLX, Rexona, Totto and Volkswagen. The sponsors played a major role in the series by providing prizes and integrating their products into various tasks.

== Cast ==
This season was composed solely of Brazilian teams, making this season the second race to only have teams from Brazil, only after A Corrida Milionária. The cast includes Mister International 2011 winner César Curti and his friend Daniel, twins and triathletes Ci & Lu, and the series first mother/son team: Ciça & Zezão.

Contestants	Age	Relationship	Hometown	Status
Gilmar "Billy" Schlossmacher	49	Brothers	São Paulo, São Paulo	Eliminated 1st (in Ouro Preto, Minas Gerais)
Gilbert "Gean" Schlossmacher	48	Brothers	São Paulo, São Paulo	Eliminated 1st (in Ouro Preto, Minas Gerais)
Ci de Franco	25	Twins/Triathletes	Campinas, São Paulo	Eliminated 2nd (in Ouro Preto, Minas Gerais)
Lu de Franco	25	Twins/Triathletes	Campinas, São Paulo	Eliminated 2nd (in Ouro Preto, Minas Gerais)
Ciça Cardoso	57	Mother & Son	Goiânia, Goiás	Eliminated 3rd (in São Paulo, São Paulo)
José "Zezão" Cardoso	26	Mother & Son	Goiânia, Goiás	Eliminated 3rd (in São Paulo, São Paulo)
Harã Lemes	29	Engaged	São Paulo, São Paulo	Eliminated 4th (in Huacachina, Peru)
Marília "Gabriela" David	29	Engaged	São Paulo, São Paulo	Eliminated 4th (in Huacachina, Peru)
Luiz Fuzetti	54	Father & Son	Embu das Artes, São Paulo	Eliminated 5th (in La Paz, Bolivia)
Luiz "Nando" Cardim	30	Father & Son	Embu das Artes, São Paulo	Eliminated 5th (in La Paz, Bolivia)
Cainã Nagano	22	Dating	Brasília, Distrito Federal	Eliminated 6th (on Isla del Sol, Bolivia)
Fernanda Chateaubriand	22	Dating	Brasília, Distrito Federal	Eliminated 6th (on Isla del Sol, Bolivia)
Ana Paula Caetano	32	Friends	Brasília, Distrito Federal	Eliminated 7th (in Rio de Janeiro, Rio de Janeiro)
Renata Faria	33	Friends	Brasília, Distrito Federal	Eliminated 7th (in Rio de Janeiro, Rio de Janeiro)
Renan Amaral	36	Friends	Rio de Janeiro, Rio de Janeiro	Eliminated 8th (in Fortaleza, Ceará)
Fran Mattoso	27	Friends	Rio de Janeiro, Rio de Janeiro	Eliminated 8th (in Fortaleza, Ceará)
Edu Braga y García	25	Brothers	Uberlândia, Minas Gerais	Third Place
Rick Braga y García	29	Brothers	Uberlândia, Minas Gerais	Third Place
Ferds Martins	32	Boyfriends	São Paulo, São Paulo	Second Place
Fer Ruas	32	Boyfriends	São Paulo, São Paulo	Second Place
Daniel Belém	25	Friends	Ribeirão Preto, São Paulo	Winners
César Curti	25	Friends	São Paulo, São Paulo	Winners

== Results ==
The following teams participated in the season, with their relationships at the time of filming. Note that this table is not necessarily reflective of all content broadcast on television due to inclusion or exclusion of some data. Placements are listed in finishing order:

Team	Position (by leg)												
Team	1	2^{2}	3^{6}	4	5	6	7	8	9	10	11	12^{19}	
Daniel & César	5th	7th	9th⊂^{9}	7th	6th	6th	4th	5th⊃	2nd	2nd	1st	3rd	1st
Fer & Ferds	4th	3rd^{3}	5th	3rd	3rd	2nd^{13}	3rd^{14}	2nd	3rd	3rd	2nd^{18}	1st	2nd
Edu & Rick	6th	4th	2nd	1st	2nd	3rd	5th^{15}	4th	1st	1st	3rd	2nd	3rd^{20}
Renan & Fran	2nd	8th	6th⊃	6th	5th	4th	2nd	3rd⊂	4th	4th	4th		
Ana Paula & Renata	1st	1st	1st	4th^{10}	4th	1st	1st	1stε^{16}	5th^{17}	5th			
Fernanda & Cainã	3rd	5th	4th	2nd	1st	5th	6th^{15}	6th					
Fuzetti & Nando	8th	2nd	7th^{7}	5th	7th	7th	7th						
Gabriela & Harã	10th	9th	8th^{8}	8th^{10}	8th^{12}								
Ciça & Zezão	9th	6th	3rd	9th^{11}									
Billy & Gean	11th∪^{1}	10th^{4}											
Ci & Lu	7th	11th^{5}											

Key

- A red team placement indicates that the team was eliminated.
- A purple ε indicates that the team decided to use the Express Pass on that leg.
- An underlined blue team placement indicates that the team came in last on a non-elimination leg and had to perform a Speed Bump in the next leg.
- An orange ∪ indicates that the team was penalized for finishing last in the Starting Line task and were subject to an automatic U-Turn at the first Detour.
- A brown ⊃ indicates means the team chose to use a U-Turn; ⊂ indicates the team who received it; ⊂⊃ indicates that the U-Turn for that leg was available but not used. A cyan ⋑ indicates that the team chose to use the second U-Turn in a Double U-Turn; ⋐ indicates the team who received it; ⋐⋑ around a leg number indicates that only one of the two available U-Turns was used.
- An underlined leg number indicates that there was no mandatory rest period at the Pit Stop and all teams were ordered to continue racing, except for the last team to arrive, who was eliminated. The first place team was still awarded a prize for that leg.

Notes

1. Gean & Billy's automatic U-Turn penalty occurred in Leg 2.
2. Leg 2 was a double-elimination leg. The last two teams to be checked in at the Pit Stop were both eliminated.
3. Fer & Ferds initially arrived 1st, but they received a 30-minute penalty for not picking up their Roadblock clue. Ana Paula & Renata and Fuzetti & Nando checked-in during the penalty time, dropping Fer & Ferds to 3rd.
4. Gean & Billy initially arrived 3rd, but they were issued two penalties totalling 2 hours and 30 minutes (a 2-hour penalty for refusing to complete either Detours as a result of their Automatic U-turn (see note 1), and a 30-minute penalty for not picking up their Roadblock clue). Seven teams checked-in during their penalty time, dropping Gean & Billy to 10th; because they were the second-to-last team to check-in in the double-elimination leg (see note 2), they were eliminated as a result.
5. Ci & Lu failed to complete the Roadblock in Leg 2. After all other teams had checked in at the mat, Paulo came out to the Roadblock location to inform them of their elimination.
6. Six of the nine teams arrived at the Pit Stop after applying 30-minute penalties after they had inadvertently skipped the U-Turn area. The initial placements for all teams are as follows (the three **boldfaced teams** were not given the penalty):
  1st: Ana Paula & Renata; 2nd: **Edu & Rick**; 3rd: Gabriela & Harã; 4th: Ciça & Zezão; 5th: Fernanda & Cainã; 6th: Fer & Ferds; 7th: Fuzetti & Nando; 8th: **Renan & Fran**; 9th: **Daniel & César**
7. Fuzetti & Nando were issued a 15-minute penalty because Fuzetti physically helped Nando during the Roadblock.
8. Gabriela & Harã were issued a 2-hour penalty for not completing either Detour options.
9. Daniel & César were issued a 2-hour penalty for not doing one of the sides of their Detour as a result on being U-turned. They arrived at the Pit Stop last, but were notified that it was a non-elimination leg. The 2-hour penalty they would have taken from the Detour/U-Turn was instead applied to their starting time in Leg 4.
10. ^ **^{a}** **^{b}** Ana Paula & Renata and Gabriela & Harã initially arrived 1st and 6th, respectively, but both were issued 30-minute penalties because they lost their puck during the puck challenge of the leg. Their placements were dropped to 4th and 8th place, respectively.
11. Ciça & Zezão initially arrived 5th, but were issued a 2-hour penalty as Ciça improperly completed the Roadblock. The last four teams trailing them checked-in during their penalty time, dropping Ciça & Zezão to last place and resulting in their elimination.
12. Harã failed to complete the Roadblock in Leg 5. Already in last place, Gabriela & Harã proceeded to the Pit Stop where they checked in and were eliminated without the 2-hour penalty being issued.
13. Fer & Ferds initially arrived 1st, but were issued a 15-minute penalty for traveling by taxi to the Puente de los Suspiros, instead of traveling by bus as the clue specifically instructed. Ana Paula & Renata checked-in during their penalty time, dropping Fer & Ferds to 2nd.
14. Fer & Ferds initially arrived 2nd, but were issued a 15-minute penalty for improperly completing the Detour. Renan & Fran checked-in during the penalty time, dropping Fer & Ferds to 3rd.
15. ^**^{a}** **^{b}** Edu & Rick and Fernanda & Cainã initially arrived in 3rd and 5th place, respectively, but both teams were issued 15-minute penalties because they lost their ekeko's hat during the ekeko hat task in this leg. Their placements were dropped to 5th and 6th, respectively.
16. Ana Paula & Renata elected to use the Express Pass to bypass the Detour in Leg 8.
17. Ana Paula & Renata initially arrived 4th, but they were issued a 2-hour penalty for refusing to complete the additional task at Fábrica de Troncos Embrapem. Renan & Fran checked-in during the penalty time, dropping Ana Paula & Renata to last place; however, they were notified the leg was non-elimination, and the remaining penalty would be assessed at the start of the next leg.
18. Fer & Ferds initially arrived 1st, but were issued a 30-minute penalty as they read the clue before choosing the team member that was going to perform the Roadblock. Daniel & César checked-in during their penalty time, dropping Fer & Ferds to 2nd.
19. Leg 12 was a double-length leg. It featured a Virtual Pit Stop, and had one Detour (first half) and two Roadblocks shown over two episodes.
20. Edu & Rick failed to complete an additional task at Centro de Instrução de Guerra na Selva, but since they were the last team to arrive at the Finish Line, their penalty was not applied.

== Prizes ==
The prize for each leg is awarded to the first place team for that leg and to the top three teams.

- Leg 1 – The Express Pass (Passe Directo) – an item that can be used to skip any task of the team's choosing and a Blackberry Bold for each team member.
- Leg 2 – A survival kit for each team member.
- Leg 3 – A heart rate monitor for each team member.
- Leg 4 – An HD Camera for Extreme Sports for each team member.
- Leg 5 – A GPS for each team member.
- Leg 6 – A flip camera for each team member.
- Leg 7 – A video game console for each team member.
- Leg 8 – A digital audio player for each team member.
- Leg 9 – A bicycle for each team member.
- Leg 10 – A digital camera for each team member.
- Leg 11 – A Blackberry Tablet for each team member.
- Leg 12:
  - Midpoint – A LED TV for each team member.
  - 1st Place – US$250,000
  - 2nd Place – A trip for four to Riviera Maya, Mexico.
  - 3rd Place – A trip for four to Orlando, Florida, United States.

== Race summary ==
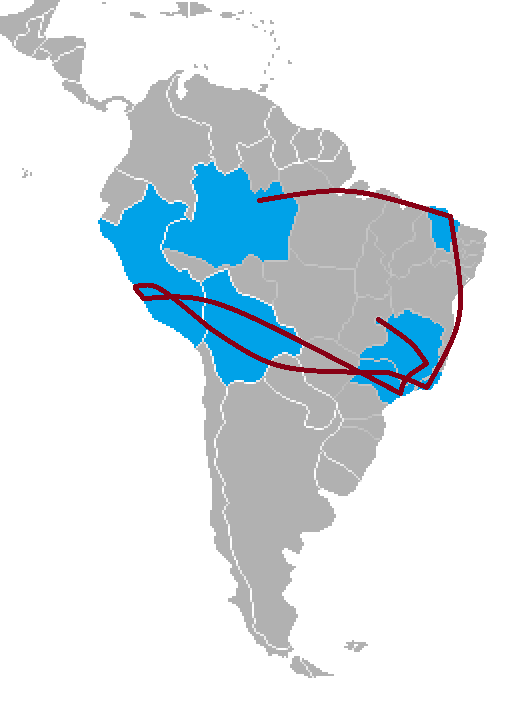
Route Map.

Destinations	Air travel Rail travel Water travel Bus travel Helicopter travel Bicycle travel Gondola travel
Route Markers	Desvio (Detour) Obstáculo (Roadblock) Retorno (U-Turn); Multa (Speed Bump) Parada (Pit Stop)

=== Leg 1 (Distrito Federal) ===
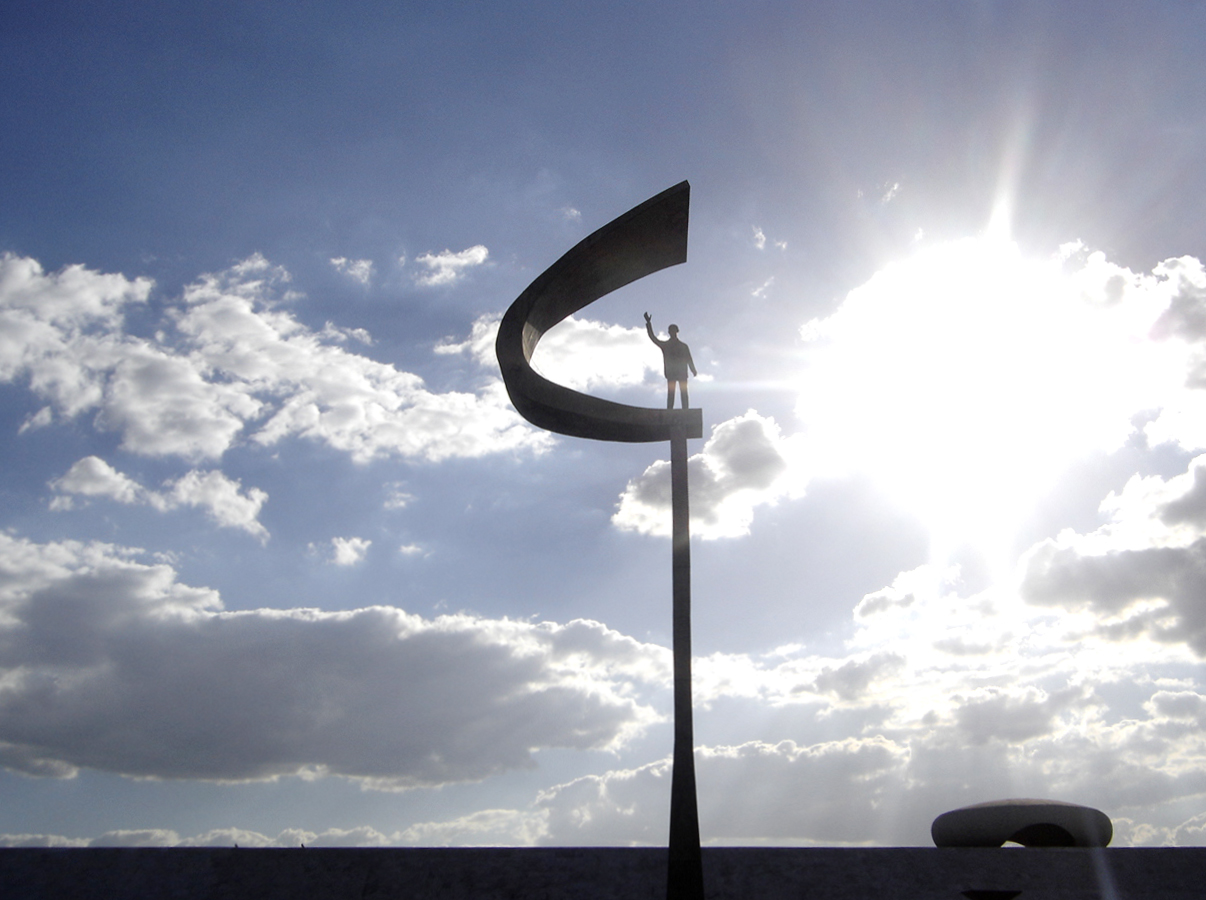
At Brasília's JK Memorial, teams had to photograph different works of Oscar Niemeyer.

Airdate: October 7, 2012 (Brazil); October 9, 2012 (Rest of Latin America)

- Brasília, Distrito Federal, Brazil (National Congress – Monumental Axis) (Starting Line)
- Brasília (JK Memorial)
- Brasília (Brasília TV Tower)
- Brasília (Brasília Digital TV Tower)

In this season's first Roadblock, one team member had to rappel 75 metres (246 ft) down from the Brasília TV Tower outlook to the base of the tower to receive their next clue.

Additional tasks

- At the Monumental Axis, teams had to search among hundreds of maps for one of only eleven maps of Brasília. Once teams had presented a correct map to Paulo Zulu, he would hand them their next clue. Additionally, the last team to complete this task would be penalized with a U-Turn on the season's first Detour.
- At the JK Memorial, teams were given a Blackberry phone and had to use it to search for three works of Oscar Niemeyer (Brasília Cathedral, Biblioteca Nacional de Brasília and Museu Nacional da República). Then, teams had to take a picture of each monument with one of the team members included in the picture and send the pictures with the Blackberry phones to the judge. If the pictures were correct, teams would receive a message with their next clue.

=== Leg 2 (Distrito Federal → Minas Gerais) ===
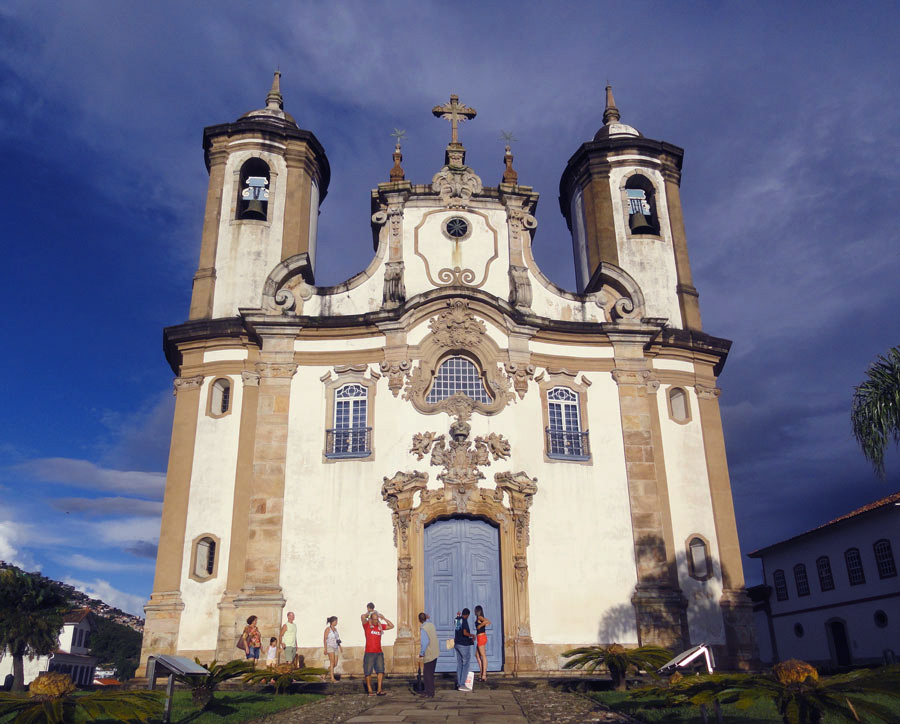
While in Ouro Preto, teams had to find the Igreja Nossa Senhora do Carmo.

Airdate: October 7, 2012 (Brazil); October 9, 2012 (Rest of Latin America)

- Brasília (Brasília International Airport) to Belo Horizonte, Minas Gerais (Tancredo Neves International Airport)
- Ouro Preto (Igreja Nossa Senhora do Carmo (in Portuguese))
  - Ouro Preto (Café & Restaurante Deguste)
- Ouro Preto (Terminal de Integraçao) to Mariana
- Mariana (Mina da Passagem (in Portuguese))
- Mariana to Ouro Preto (Terminal de Integraçao)
- Ouro Preto (Largo de Marília)
- Ouro Preto (Praça Tiradentes (in Portuguese))
- Ouro Preto (Chopperia Real or Igreja São Francisco de Assis)
- Ouro Preto (Ouro Preto Train Station)
- Ouro Preto (Teatro Municipal (in Portuguese))

For their Speed Bump, Gean & Billy had to pose for a cartoonist who would draw a caricature of the team before they could continue racing.

This season's first Detour was a choice between Pão de Queijo (Cheese Bread) or Pedra de Sabao (Soap Stone). In Pão de Queijo, teams had to eat 60 cheese buns to receive their next clue. In Pedra de Sabao, teams had to use soapstone to create one soap dish and its base following a model to receive their next clue.

In this leg's Roadblock, teams had to enter a circus tent set up at the Ouro Preto Train Station, where one team member had to balance in a small seesaw for one minute without falling to receive their clue.

Additional tasks

- At Mina da Passagem, teams had to enter the mine and build a rock wall that was 1 metre tall, 2 metres wide and 40 centimetres deep to receive their next clue.
- At Largo de Marília, teams had to carry a donkey with 16 logs in a specific form. Then teams had to transport the donkey and give it to the person who would give them their next clue.

=== Leg 3 (Minas Gerais) ===
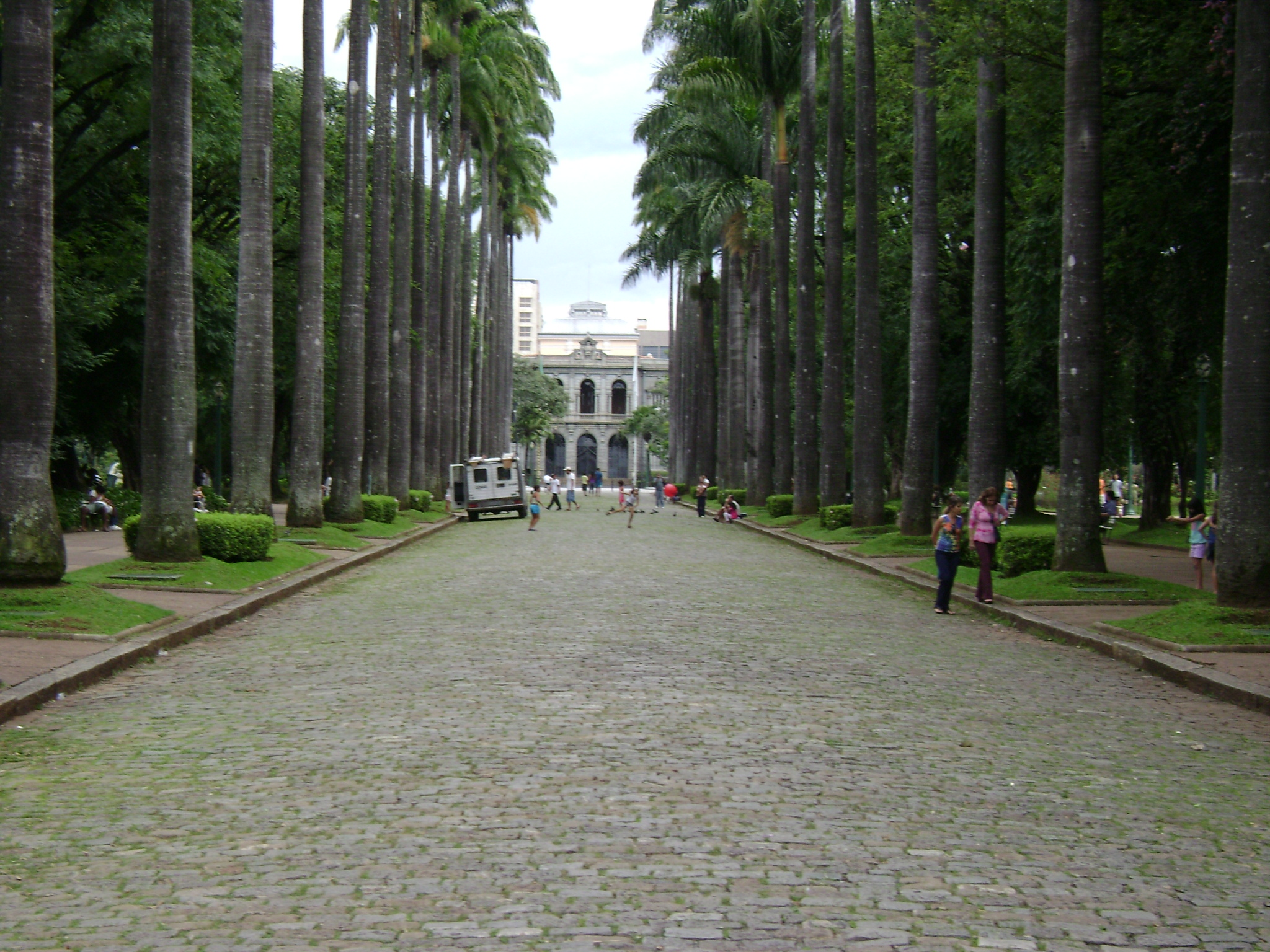
Belo Horizonte's Praça da Liberdade was the site for this leg's Roadblock.

Airdate: October 14, 2012 (Brazil); October 16, 2012 (Rest of Latin America)

- Belo Horizonte (Praça da Liberdade)
- Belo Horizonte (Belo Horizonte Fire Department)
- Belo Horizonte (Parque Municipal das Mangabeiras (in Portuguese))
- Belo Horizonte (One Day Spa)
- Belo Horizonte (Bar Tip Top)
- Belo Horizonte (Bar Albanos)

In this leg's Roadblock, one team member had to fill a decorative bottle following the given model with small peppers of different colours, oil and salt to receive their next clue.

This leg's Detour was a choice between Seco (Dry) or Molhado (Wet). In Seco, one team member at a time had to first ascend the upstairs to the top of the training tower and then walk and equilibrate across the tower. After that, the team members had to rappel down the tower and lift up 45 kilograms (99 lb) of weight. Then, both team members had to move a car using a special mechanism to receive their next clue. In Molhado, both team members had to get into a pool and then go across a submerged tube. After going across the tube, teams had to swim to each four corners of the pool and respirate with an oxygen tank. In the second part, teams had to rescue a person from the pool and then turn off a tree of fire to receive their next clue.

Additional tasks

- At the Parque das Mangabeiras, teams had to follow the marked path to the observatory, and there they had to identify 15 species of native trees. Then, teams had to make their way to Praça das aguas and inform to the biologist the trees they spotted. If all 15 trees were correct, teams would receive their next clue.
- At the One Day Spa, both team members had to undergo a 10-minute session of Brazilian body waxing to receive their next clue from a beautician.
- At the Bar Tip Top, each team member had to take a tray with 12 cups each and fill them with beer in four different bars (each member could only fill three cups at each bar). Once the 24 cups were filled with beer, teams had to give them to Paulo Zulu at the Bar Albanos, this leg's Pit Stop.

=== Leg 4 (Minas Gerais → São Paulo) ===
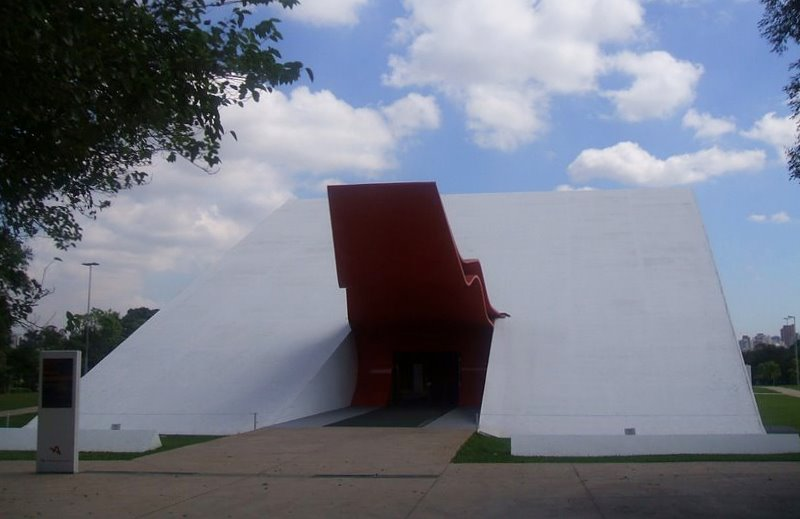
São Paulo's Ibirapuera Auditorium was the Pit Stop for this leg.

Airdate: October 21, 2012 (Brazil); October 23, 2012 (Rest of Latin America)

- Belo Horizonte (Tancredo Neves International Airport) to São Paulo, São Paulo (São Paulo–Congonhas Airport)
- São Paulo (Palmeiras Training Centre)
- São Paulo (Praça dos Omaguás)
- São Paulo (Chácara Santa Cecília or Farm Fashion Store)
- São Paulo (República Neighbourhood (in Portuguese) – Intersection of Rua Sete de Abril (in Portuguese) and Rua Coronel Xavier de Toledo)
- São Paulo (Largo da Memória (in Portuguese))
- São Paulo (Ibirapuera Park – Gate 8)
- São Paulo (Ibirapuera Park – Ibirapuera Auditorium)

For their Speed Bump, Daniel & César had to cut pieces of meat and then make ten meat skewers each before they could continue racing.

This leg's Detour was a choice between Pizza or Manequins (Mannequins). In Pizza, teams had to carry a flour sack from Praça dos Omaguás to Chácara Santa Cecília. Once there, each team member had to knead and elaborate 10 pizza dough to the size of a large plate. If the judge was satisfied with the size, teams would receive their next clue. In Manequins, each team member had to transport a mannequin from Praça dos Omaguás to Farm Fashion Store. There, teams had to dress each mannequin following the given pictures and taking clothes from the store. Once the mannequins matched the pictures, teams would receive their next clue.

In this leg's Roadblock, one team member had to follow a designed parkour course to receive their next clue from a parkour expert.

Additional tasks

- At the Palmeiras Training Centre, teams had to complete an exhaustive soccer training while judged by the trainer. Teams had to warm up, pass the ball, score a goal, etc. Once completed the course, and if the judge was satisfied, teams would receive their next clue.
- At the Gate 8, both team members had to wear kangoo jumps and use a hockey stick to push a hockey puck through the park until they reached the judge's location. Once the teams reached the finish point, the judge would hand them their next clue. If a team lost their puck during the course, they would receive a 30-minute penalty at the Pit Stop.

=== Leg 5 (São Paulo → Peru) ===
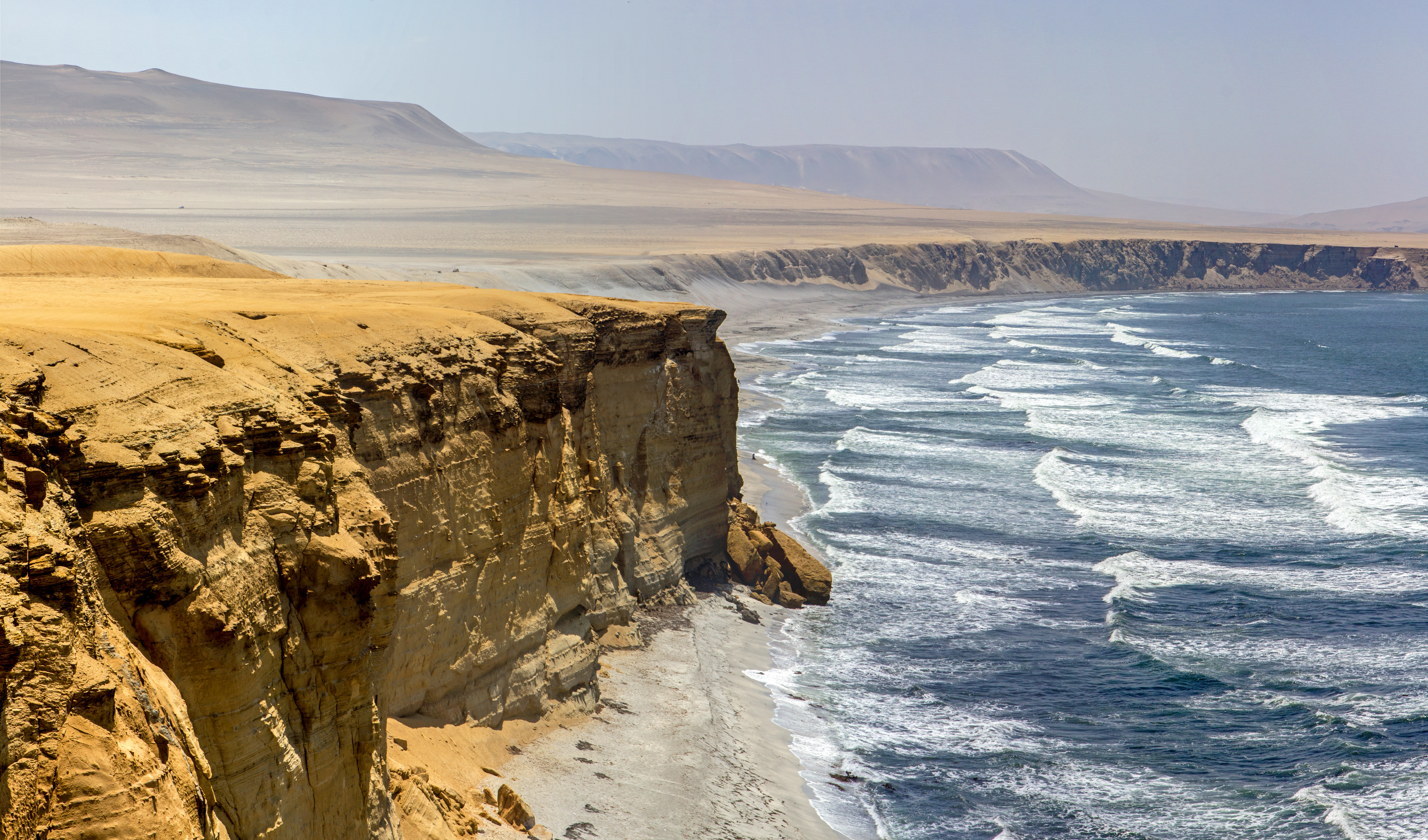
After arriving in Peru, teams visited the coasts of Paracas.

Airdate: October 28, 2012 (Brazil); October 30, 2012 (Rest of Latin America)

- São Paulo (São Paulo/Guarulhos International Airport) to Lima, Peru (Jorge Chávez International Airport)
- Lima (Terrapuerto) to Pisco, Ica Region (Bus Station)
- Paracas (Paracas Obelisk) (Overnight Rest)
- Paracas (El Chaco)
- Paracas (Pier)
- Ballestas Islands, Paracas (Sea Platform)
- Paracas (Caleta de Pescadores de Lagunillas)
- Huacachina (Buggy Parking Lot)
- Huacachina (Oasis Huacachina)

In this leg's Roadblock, teams had to keep the provisions they bought, and travel by boat from the Embarcadero to the Ballestas Islands. Once there, one team member had to ascend a rope ladder to the top of a sea platform where they had to give the provisions to the judge. If teams had all the requested items, they would receive their next clue.

This leg's Detour was a choice between Redes (Nets) or Fardos. In Redes, teams had to travel by boat to the marked area in the sea. Once there, teams had to retrieve a large net from the sea, which included their next clue with the shape of a fish. In Fardos, teams had to dig in a marked archaeological site to find a fardo funerario. Inside the fardo, teams would find their next clue.

Additional tasks

- In El Chaco, teams had to buy different provisions from a list, including milk, cookies, tuna, bananas, maca oats, etc. Then, teams had to make their way to the Pier, where they would find the cluebox with their next clue.
- At the Buggy Parking Lot, teams were driven in a buggy through the dunes until they reached a specific dune. Then, teams had to sandboard from the top of a dune to their next Pit Stop, Huancachina Oasis.

=== Leg 6 (Peru) ===
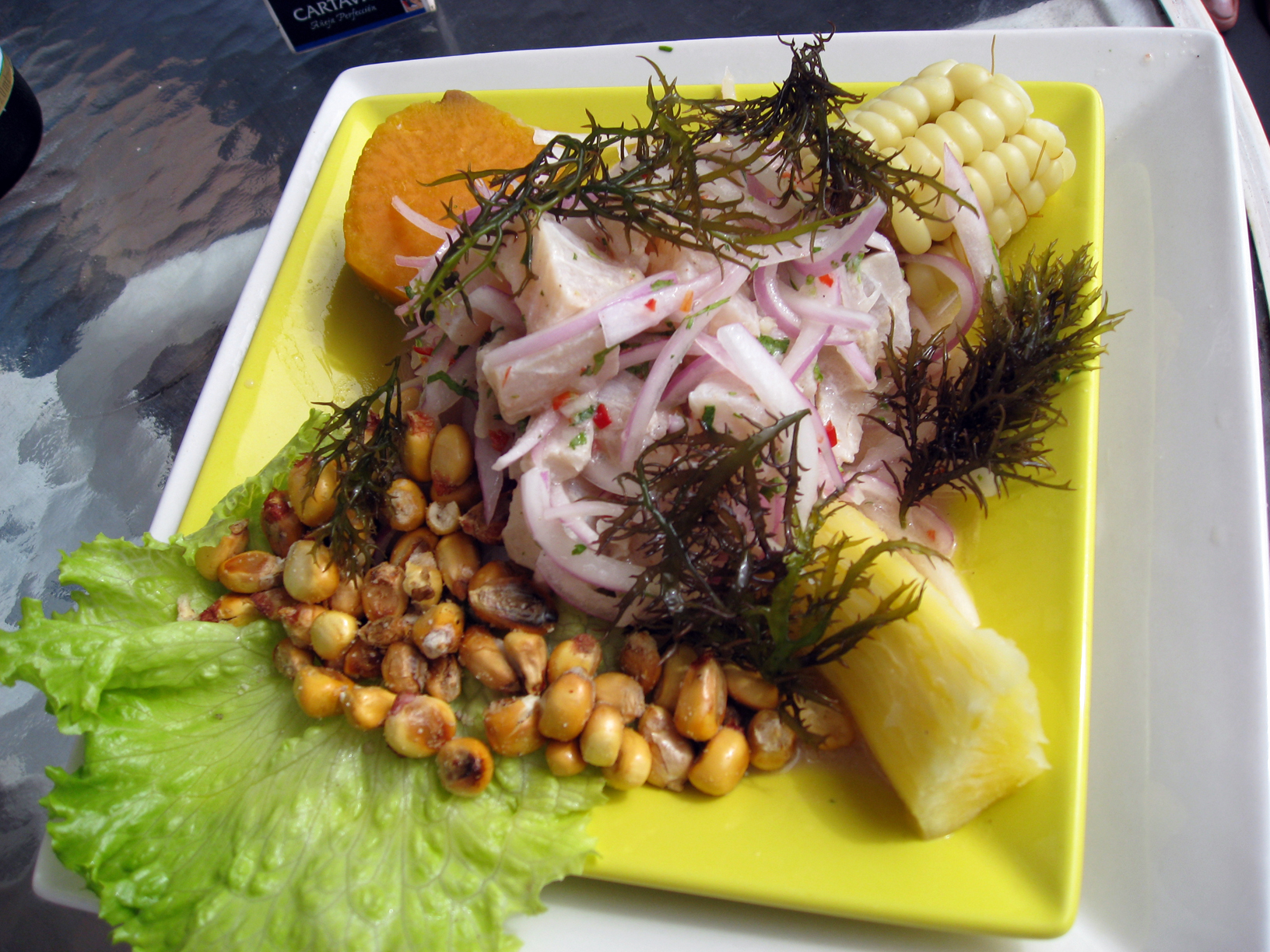
At Lima's La Rosa Náutica Restaurant, each team member had to prepare a plate of ceviche.

Airdate: November 4, 2012 (Brazil); November 6, 2012 (Rest of Latin America)

- Paracas (Bus Stop) to Lima (Terrapuerto)
- Lima (Hotel Casa Andina (in Spanish))
- Lima (Hacienda Mamacona)
- Lima (Alameda de los Descalzos (in Spanish))
- Lima (La Rosa Náutica Restaurant)
- Lima (Puente de los Suspiros)
- Lima (Huaca Pucllana)

In this leg's Roadblock, one team member had to saddle a horse, dress as a chalán, and then ride through an equestrian circuit in less than three minutes to receive their next clue.

This leg's Detour was a choice between Estátuas (Statues) or Touros (Bulls). In Estátuas, each team member had to wear tunics and paint their faces with white paint. Teams then had to pose for 20 minutes imitating one of the statues in the Alameda, after then teams would receive their next clue from a human statue. In Touros, one team member had to ride up a wheelbarrow with the shape of a bull, while the other team member pushed the wheelbarrow to the Central Arena of the Plaza de toros de Acho, where a torero would hand them their next clue.

Additional tasks

- At La Rosa Náutica Restaurant, each team member had to prepare a plate of ceviche using the given materials and following the recipe. Once the chef was satisfied with the taste of the Ceviche, teams would receive their next clue.
- After completing the ceviche task, teams were given a CD. Then, teams had to get a CD reproductor and listen to the CD in order to get their next location from a bolero song; Puente de los Suspiros. Teams had to travel by bus to the bridge and once there hand the CD to musicians playing the song, who would give them their next clue.

=== Leg 7 (Peru → Bolivia) ===
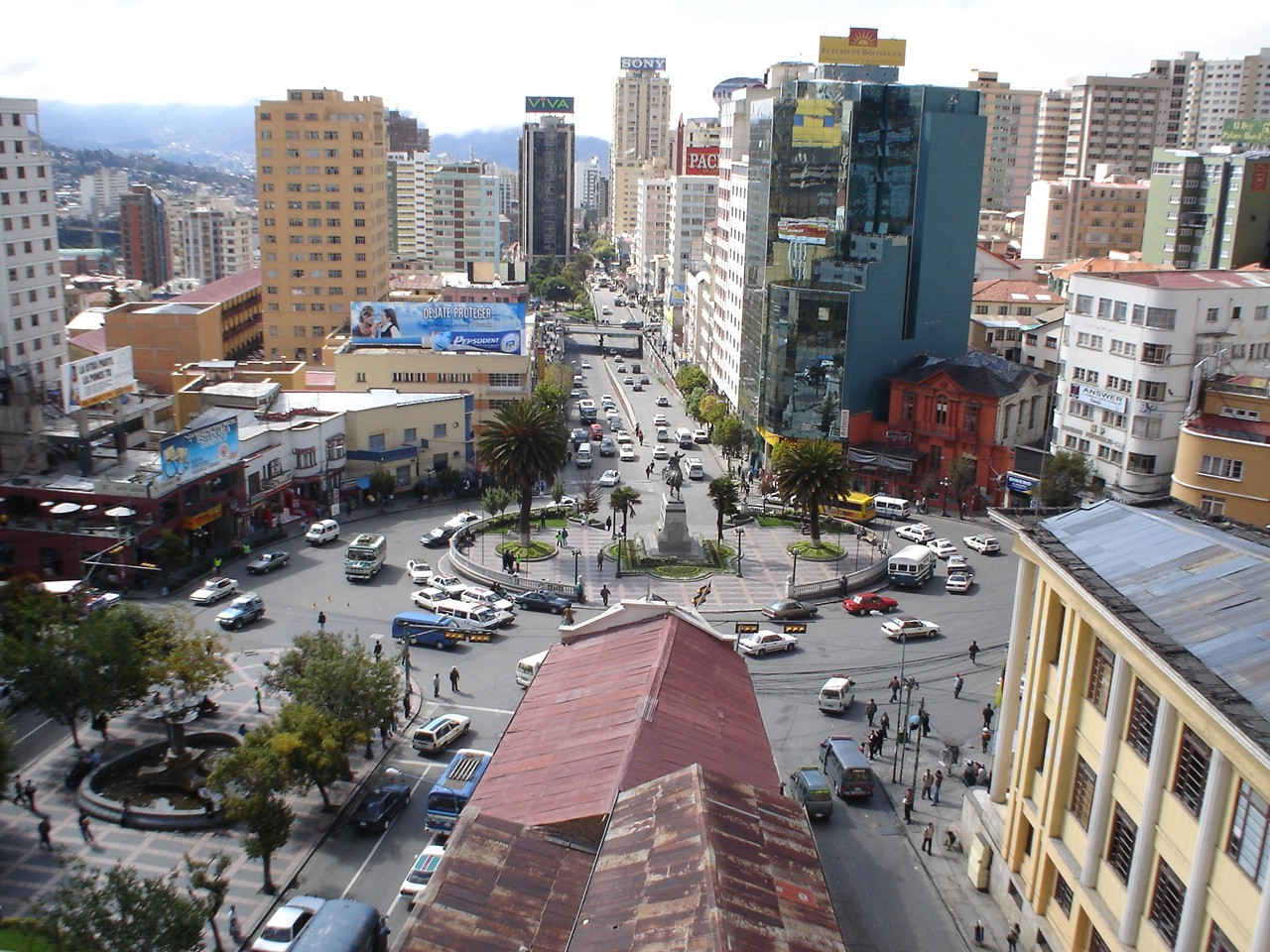
In this leg, teams travelled to La Paz and had to teach locals traffic rules at la Plaza del Estudiante.

Airdate: November 11, 2012 (Brazil); November 13, 2012 (Rest of Latin America)

- Lima (Jorge Chávez International Airport) to La Paz, Bolivia (El Alto International Airport)
- La Paz (Plaza del Estudiante (in Spanish))
- La Paz (Basílica de San Francisco)
- La Paz (Plaza Alonso de Mendoza (in Spanish))
  - La Paz (Calle de las Brujas)
- La Paz (Lanza Mercado or Street Typewriters)
- La Paz (Parque Laikakota (in Spanish))
- La Paz (Mirador Killi Killi (in Spanish))

For their Speed Bump, Fuzetti & Nando had to make their find Rosita on Calle de las Brujas and deliver 30 plates of soup to people on the street with card before they could continue racing.

This leg's Detour was a choice between Aparapitas or Escribas (Scribes). In Aparapitas, each team member had to carry two large sacks on their shoulders from the Lanza Mercado to the local Requena to receive their next clue. In Escribas, one team member had to use a typewriter and write a letter in Spanish, which was dictated by the other team member, to receive their next clue.

In this leg's Roadblock, one team member had to first learn a traditional Andean dance and dress themselves with masks and costumes. Then, the team member had to dance across Parque Laikakota. Once the expert dancer was satisfied, teams would receive their next clue.

Additional tasks

- At Plaza del Estudiante, teams had to pick up a small bag called a chuspa and then make their way to Basílica de San Francisco. Once there, teams had to undergo a 15-minute instruction in traffic laws. Teams would then dress like the city's traffic zebras and teach pedestrians and drivers what they learned, for 15 minutes. Once finished, Mama Zebra would hand them their next clue.
- After completing the Roadblock, teams had to decorate an ekeko, using the given materials (money, food, clothes, etc.). Once completed, teams had to carry it to Mirador Killi Killi and hand it to Paulo Zulu. If one of the items was missing, teams would receive a 15-minute penalty.

=== Leg 8 (Bolivia) ===
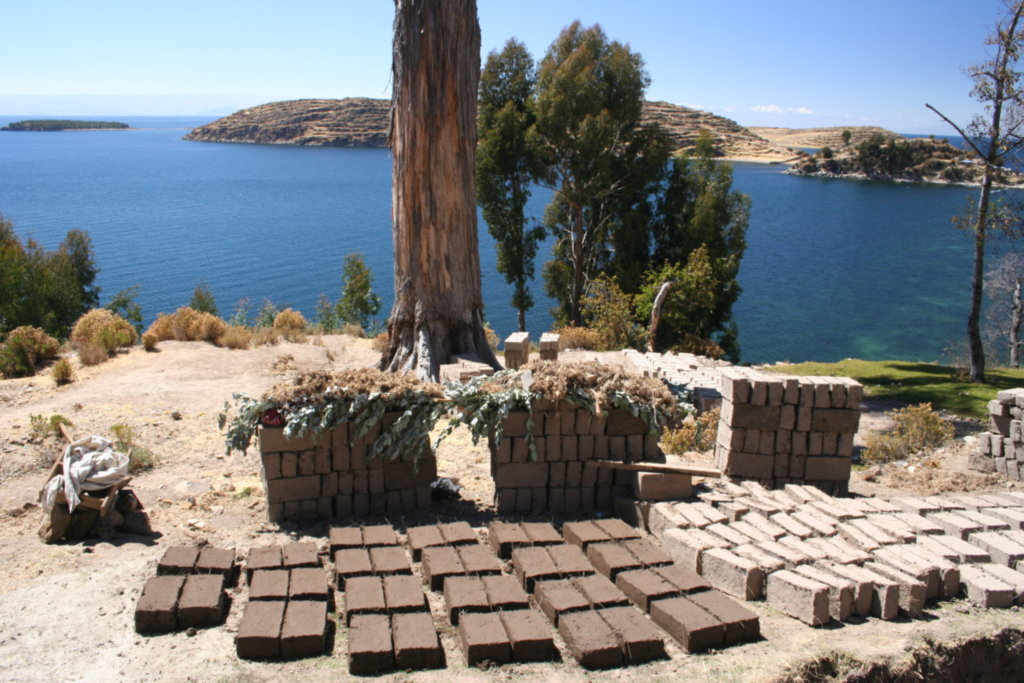
In the Tijolos side of the Detour on Lake Titicaca's Isla del Sol, teams had to make 24 adobe bricks.

Airdate: November 18, 2012 (Brazil); November 20, 2012 (Rest of Latin America)

- La Paz (Cementerio General) to Copacabana (La Orilla) (Overnight Rest)
- Copacabana (La Orilla) to Isla del Sol, Lake Titicaca (Ayjarara Pier)
- Isla del Sol (Don Carmelo's House)
- Isla del Sol (Challa Soccer Field)
- Isla del Sol (Choquepalta Beach)
- Isla del Sol (Challa Isla del Sol School)
- Isla del Sol (Choquepalta Beach) to (Chinkana Pier)
- Isla del Sol (Laberinto de Piedras)
- Isla del Sol (Piedra Sagrada)

This leg's Detour was a choice between Tijolos (Bricks) or Plantio (Plantation). In Tijolos, teams had to make 24 bricks of adobe, using a mold and their feet to mix the different materials (adobe, straw and water). Once the judge was satisfied with the bricks, teams would receive their next clue. In Plantio, teams first had to participate in a ritual for the earth's fertility and then, they had to plow two furrows to plant Oca. Once completed, teams would receive their next clue.

In this leg's Roadblock, one team member had to search through the labyrinth for different letters written in rocks, which would form the name of this leg's Pit Stop: Piedra Sagrada. If teams figured out the correct location and received the judge's confirmation, they could proceed to the Pit Stop.

Additional tasks

- At Ayjarara Pier, teams had to put all their belongings in an aguayo and carry it on their backs for the rest of the leg.
- At the Challa Soccer Field, teams had to score three goals in less than 10 minutes playing against five cholitas. If teams failed to score the goals in 10 minutes, they would have to wait for the other teams before trying again.
- At the Challa Isla del Sol School, teams had to paint a classroom and assemble three desks. If the judge was satisfied with their work, teams would receive their next clue.

=== Leg 9 (Bolivia → São Paulo) ===
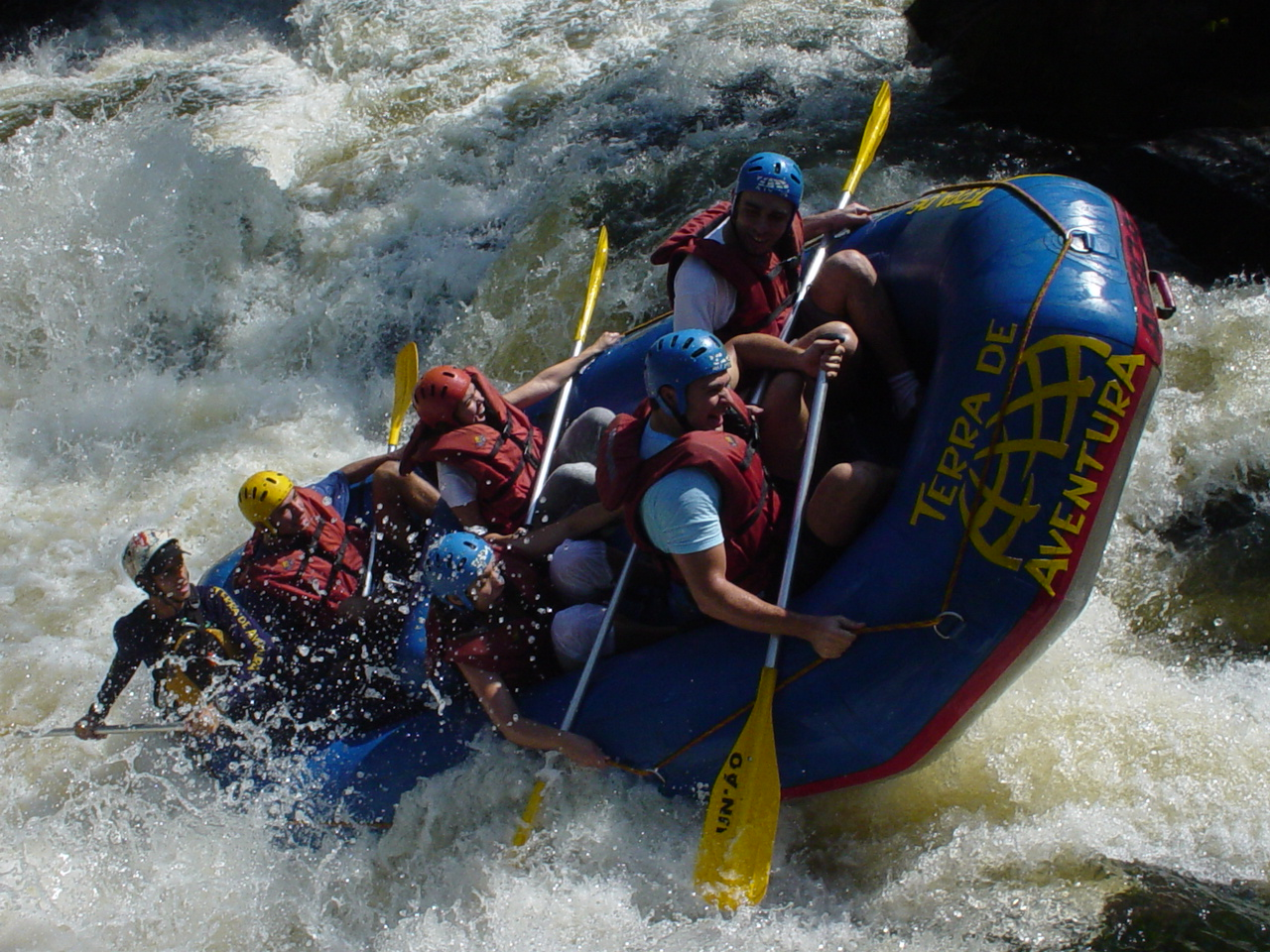
After the Roadblock in Brotas, teams had to raft to the location of their next clue.

Airdate: November 25, 2012 (Brazil); November 27, 2012 (Rest of Latin America)

- La Paz (El Alto International Airport) to São Paulo, São Paulo, Brazil (São Paulo/Guarulhos International Airport)
- São Paulo to Brotas
- Brotas (Brotas Eco Resort) (Overnight Rest)
- Brotas (Sitio do Mauricio)
- Brotas (Cantinho do Chocolate)
- Brotas (Fábrica de Troncos Embrapem)
- Brotas (Sitio 7 Quedas)
- Brotas (Recanto das Cachoeiras)

In this leg's Roadblock, one team member had to build a jangada using the provided materials (two rafts, ropes and logs). Once built, teams had to put the jangada in the river and go through a buoy circuit and then return to the shore in order to receive their next clue.

This leg's Detour was a choice between Canyoning or Arborismo (Ropes course). In Canyoning, each team member had to rappel down a waterfall. Once in the base of the waterfall, teams would receive their next clue. In Arborismo, one team member at a time had to go through a trail over the trees. Once both team members completed the trail, they would receive their next clue.

Additional tasks

- After completing the Roadblock, teams had to raft on the Jacaré-Pepira river from Sitio do Mauricio to Cantinho do Chocolate. Once there, teams had to carry their raft to the dropping point, where they would find their next clue.
- At Fábrica de Troncos Embrapem, teams had to carry 10 large trunks from point A to point B. Once teams transported all 10 trunks to point B, they had to build a 4 level pyramid in order to receive their next clue.

=== Leg 10 (São Paulo → Rio de Janeiro) ===
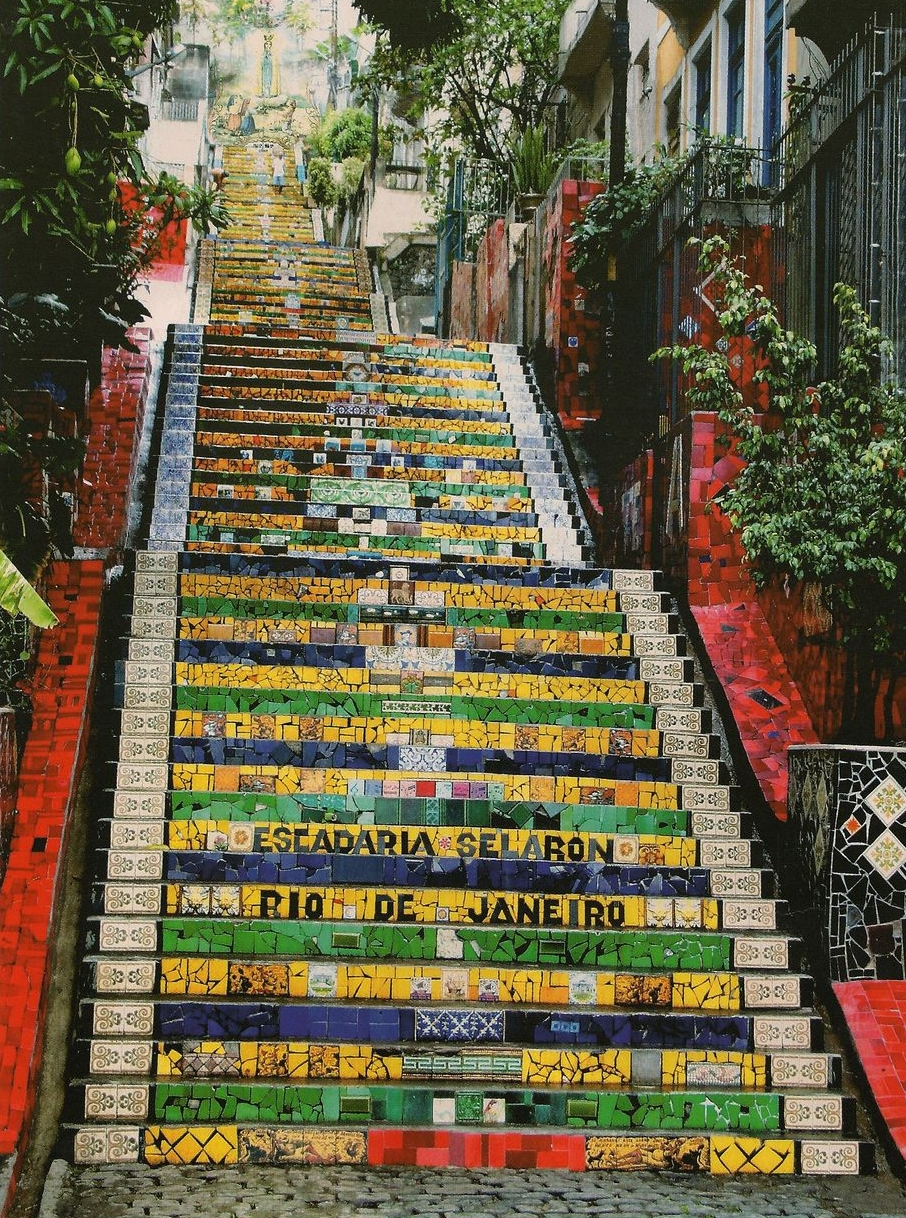
Rio de Janeiro's Escadaria Selarón was visited during this leg.

Airdate: December 2, 2012 (Brazil); December 4, 2012 (Rest of Latin America)

- São Paulo (Congonhas-São Paulo Airport) to Rio de Janeiro, Rio de Janeiro (Rio de Janeiro/Galeão International Airport)
- Rio de Janeiro (Copacabana Beach)
- Rio de Janeiro (Lagoa Rodrigo de Freitas)
- Rio de Janeiro (Escadaria Selarón)
- (Rio de Janeiro Metro) Rio de Janeiro (Cinelândia Station to Largo do Machado Station)
- Rio de Janeiro (Guinle Park (in Portuguese))
- Rio de Janeiro (BOPE Headquarters)
- Rio de Janeiro (BOPE Headquarters – Terrace)

For their Speed Bump, Ana Paula & Renata had to convince two people on the beach to be buried on the sand before they could continue racing.

In this leg's Roadblock, one team member had to balance on a wakeboard for one minute, while dragged by a motorboat to receive their next clue.

This leg's Detour was a choice between Resistência (Resistance) or Ação (Action). For both options, teams had to wear a BOPE uniform. In Resistência, both team members had to undergo a BOPE resistance training, which included abdominal exercises, push-ups, weight training, etc. In Ação, teams had to push a truck wheel and then carry a large bag to the dropping point. After finishing either option, teams had to climb a wall and ring a bell to receive their next clue from a BOPE member.

Additional task

- At Escadaria Selarón, both team members had to make their way to the top of the Escadaria while carrying a basket of fruits on their heads, imitating Carmen Miranda, and without dropping any fruit along the way to receive their next clue.

=== Leg 11 (Rio de Janeiro → Ceará) ===
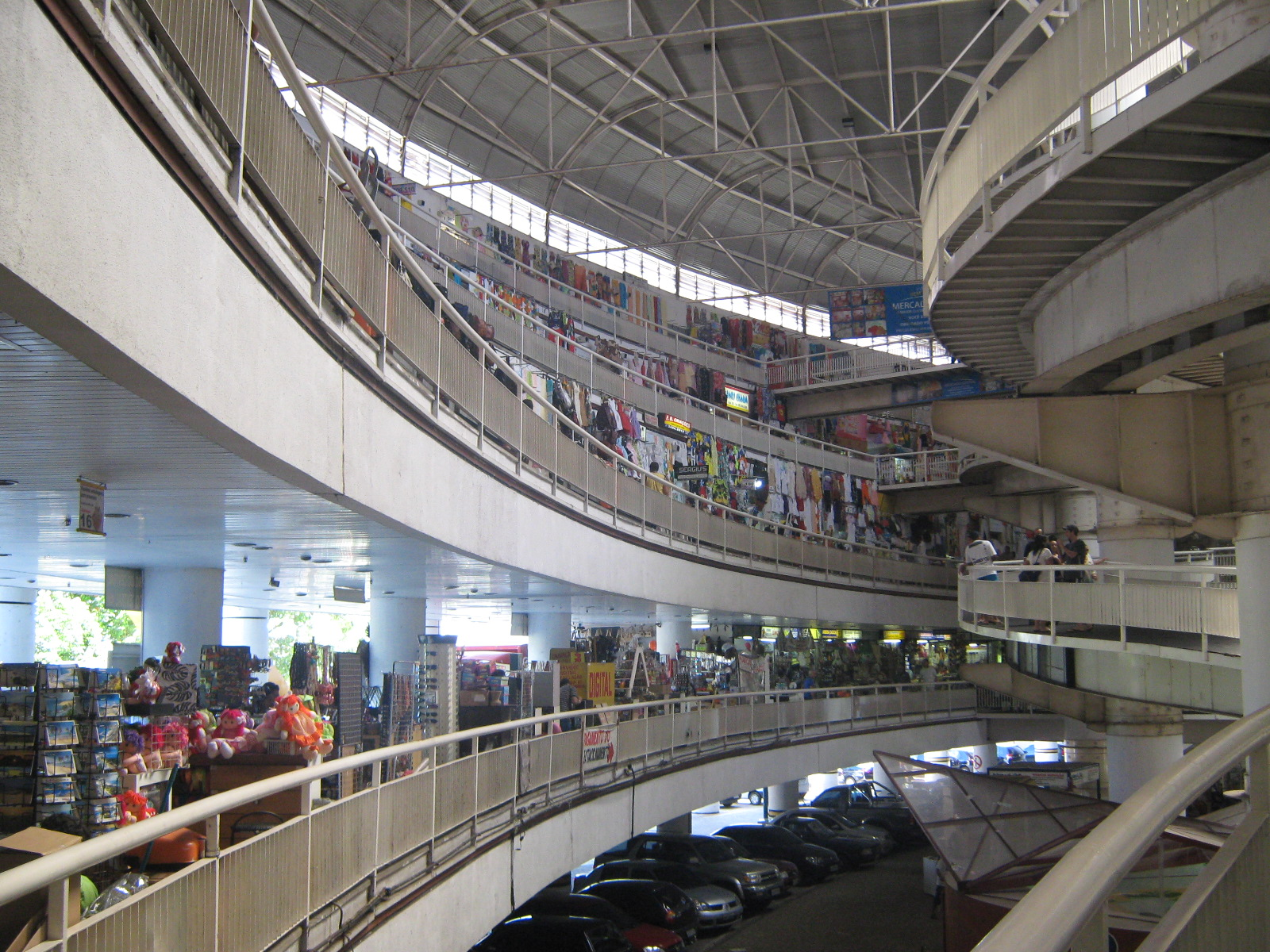
Fortaleza's Mercado Central was the site for this leg's Roadblock.

Airdate: December 9, 2012 (Brazil); December 11, 2012 (Rest of Latin America)

- Rio de Janeiro (Cidade do Samba – Escola Unidos da Tijuca (in Portuguese))
- Rio de Janeiro (Flamengo Park)
- Rio de Janeiro (Rio de Janeiro/Galeão International Airport) to Fortaleza, Ceará (Fortaleza Airport)
- Fortaleza (Hotel Nobile Suites Brasil Tropical) (Overnight Rest)
- Fortaleza (Mercado Central de Fortaleza (in Portuguese))
- Fortaleza (Praia de Meireles (in Portuguese))
- Fortaleza (Praia de Iracema – Espigão da Rui Barbosa)

This leg's Detour was a choice between Futevólei (Footvolley) or Caipirinhas. In Futevólei, teams had to play footvolley against two professional players. Once teams scored four points, the referee would hand them their next clue. In Caipirinhas, teams had to prepare sixty caipirinhas following the given indications. If teams prepared the sixty caipirinhas properly, they would receive the clue from the expert.

In this leg's Roadblock, one team member had to eat 1 kilogram (2.2 lb) of Buchada de bode, a typical meal of the Brazilian Northeast Region made with goat entrails. Once the team member ate all the buchada, teams would receive their next clue.

Additional tasks

- At the Escola Unidos da Tijuca, one team member had to dress up as a Mestre Sala and the other as a Flag bearer. Then, teams had to learn a samba choreography and perform it in front of the judges. If the judges were satisfied with their work, teams would receive their next clue.
- At Praia de Meireles, both team members had to swim in the sea over a longboard until they reached a marked buoy. Once in the buoy, teams would find a small Race flag which teams would have to carry to the shore and exchange it for their next clue.

=== Leg 12 (Ceará → Amazonas) ===
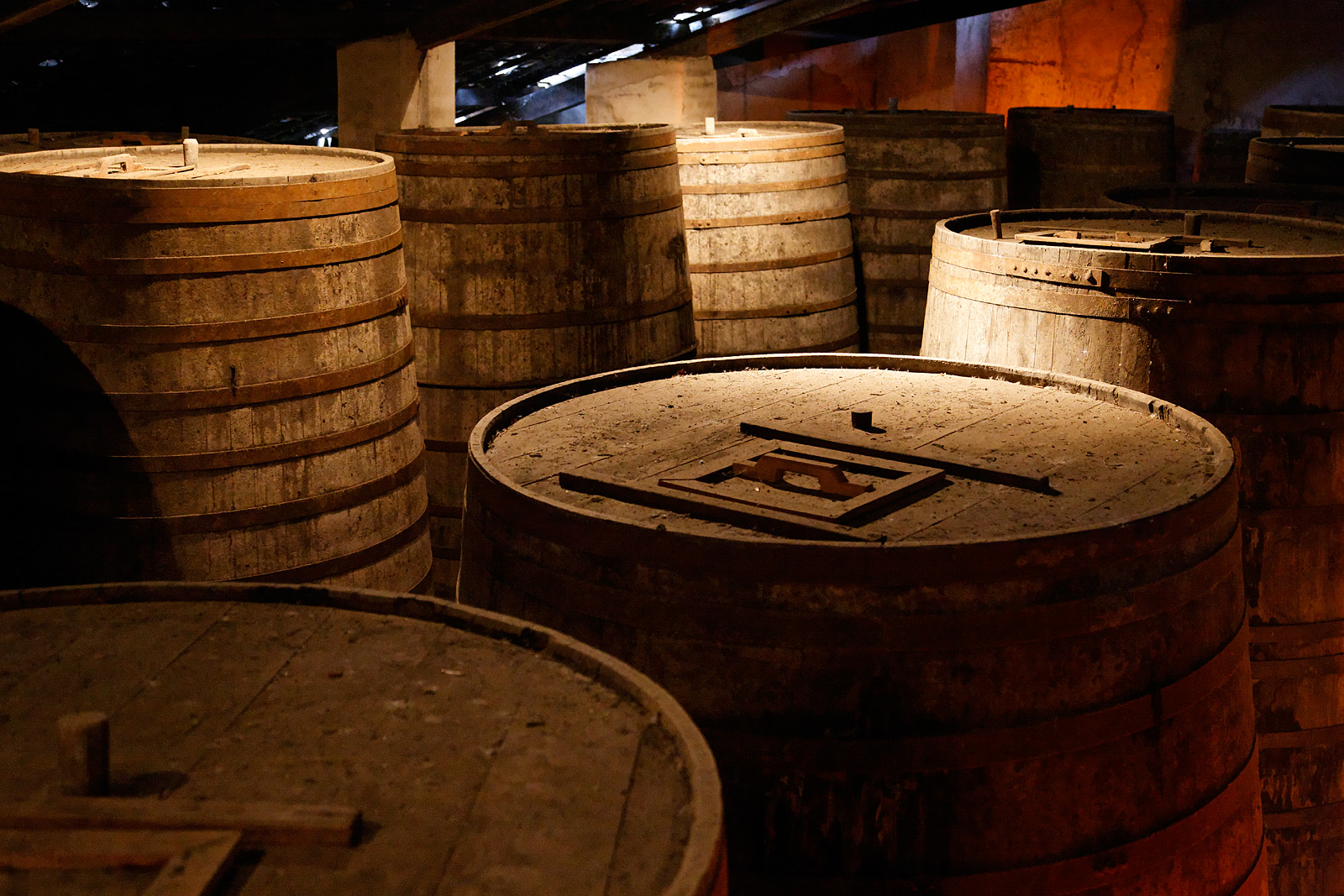
Maranguape's Museu da Cachaça was visited during the first half of this leg.

Airdate: December 16, 2012 (Brazil); December 18, 2012 (Rest of Latin America)

- Maranguape (IPark – World's Largest Cachaça Barrel in the Museu da Cachaça (in Portuguese))
- Maranguape (IPark – Casa de Engenho)
- Maranguape (IPark – Campo de Aventura)
- Maranguape (IPark – Climbing Wall)
- Fortaleza (Kukukaya )
- Fortaleza (Praia de Iracema – Ponte Metálica (in Portuguese))
- Fortaleza (Pirata Bar)

This season's final Detour was a choice between Acquaball (Aquaball) or Tif. In Acquaball, one team member at a time had to get into an acquaball and then run over the water until they reached a marked buoy and then return to the shore. Once both team members completed the course, they would receive their next clue. In Tif, one team member at a time had to use a tif system (similar to paddleboarding) that included two small tables (one for each foot) and two oars to paddle to the marked buoy and then return to the shore in order to receive their next clue.

In this leg's first Roadblock, one team member had to climb to the top of a climbing wall until they reached a Rexona Clinical deodorant. Teams had to then carry the deodorant to the base of the climbing wall and exchange it for their next clue.

Additional tasks

- At Casa de Engenho, teams had to first cut and clean twenty sugarcanes each. Then, they had to transport them to the sugarcane press and use it to extract the juice. Once completed, teams had to knead solid molasses until it reached a soft texture in order to receive their next clue.
- At Kukukaya, teams had to wear typical costumes of the Festas juninas and then dance a choreography for about 20 minutes. Once teams completed the 20 minute dance, they would receive their next clue.
- At Praia de Iracema, teams had to look for a person wearing a pirate costume who would hand them their next clue.

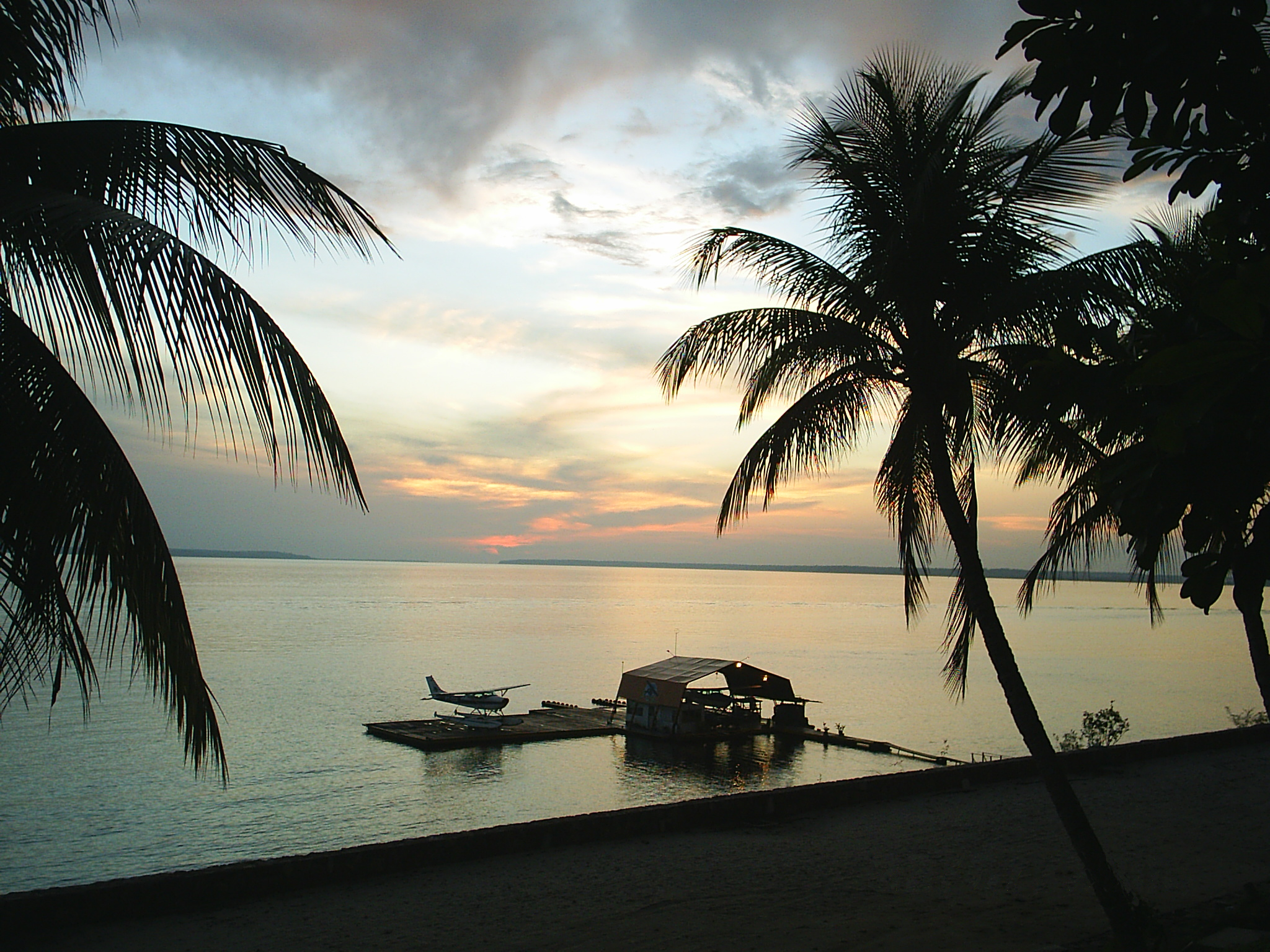
The pier of Manaus' Hotel Tropical was the Finish Line of The Amazing Race: Edição Brasil.

Airdate: December 23, 2012 (Brazil); December 25, 2012 (Rest of Latin America)

- Fortaleza (Pinto Martins International Airport) to Manaus, Amazonas (Eduardo Gomes International Airport)
- Manaus (Teatro Amazonas)
- Manaus (Port of Manaus – Balsa Amarela)
- Manaus (Centro de Instrução de Guerra na Selva (in Portuguese))
- Manaus (Centro de Instrução de Guerra na Selva – Soccer Field)
- Manaus (Hotel Tropical Manaus Pier (in Portuguese))

In this season's final Roadblock, one team member had to transport 1,200 chicken eggs from Balsa Amarela to Feira Manaus Moderna, using only their hands or shirts, and put all of the eggs into egg cartons to receive their next clue.

Additional tasks

- At Centro de Instrução de Guerra na Selva, both team members had to first wear military clothes and then set fire using two different methods. Once they set fire, one team member at a time had to climb to the top of a tree using a Brazilian Army technique and retrieve an Amazing Race flag. Once teams completed this training, they would receive their next clue.
- At the soccer field, teams had to complete a board with spaces numbered 1–12, each corresponding to a previous leg. They had to search for 12 pictures of different moments from the season (Roadblock, Detour, Route Info or Pit Stop) in chronological order, searching for the pictures in different baskets. Once teams completed their boards correctly, the judge would hand them their final clue.

Leg #	State/Country	Symbol	Location
1	Distrito Federal	Roadblock	Brasília TV Tower
2	Minas Gerais	Route Info	Igreja Nossa Senhora do Carmo
3	Minas Gerais	Pit Stop	Bar Albanos
4	São Paulo	Roadblock	Largo da Memória
5	Peru	Detour	Caleta de Pescadores de Lagunillas
6	Peru	Detour	Alameda de los Descalzos
7	Bolivia	Pit Stop	Mirador Killi Killi
8	Bolivia	Route Info	Challa Soccer Field
9	São Paulo	Roadblock	Sitio do Mauricio
10	Rio de Janeiro	Route Info	Escadaria Selarón
11	Rio de Janeiro	Detour	Flamengo Park
12	Ceará	Roadblock	IPark Climbing Wall
