= Augusto Curti =

Italian politician (born 1978)

Member of the Chamber of Deputies
- Incumbent
- Assumed office 13 October 2022
- Constituency: Marche – P01

Personal details
- Born: 4 March 1978 (age 48)
- Party: Democratic Party

Augusto Curti (born 4 March 1978) is an Italian politician serving as a member of the Chamber of Deputies since 2022. From 2006 to 2021, he served as mayor of Force.
