= Carlo Curti (Bolognese composer) =

Italian composer

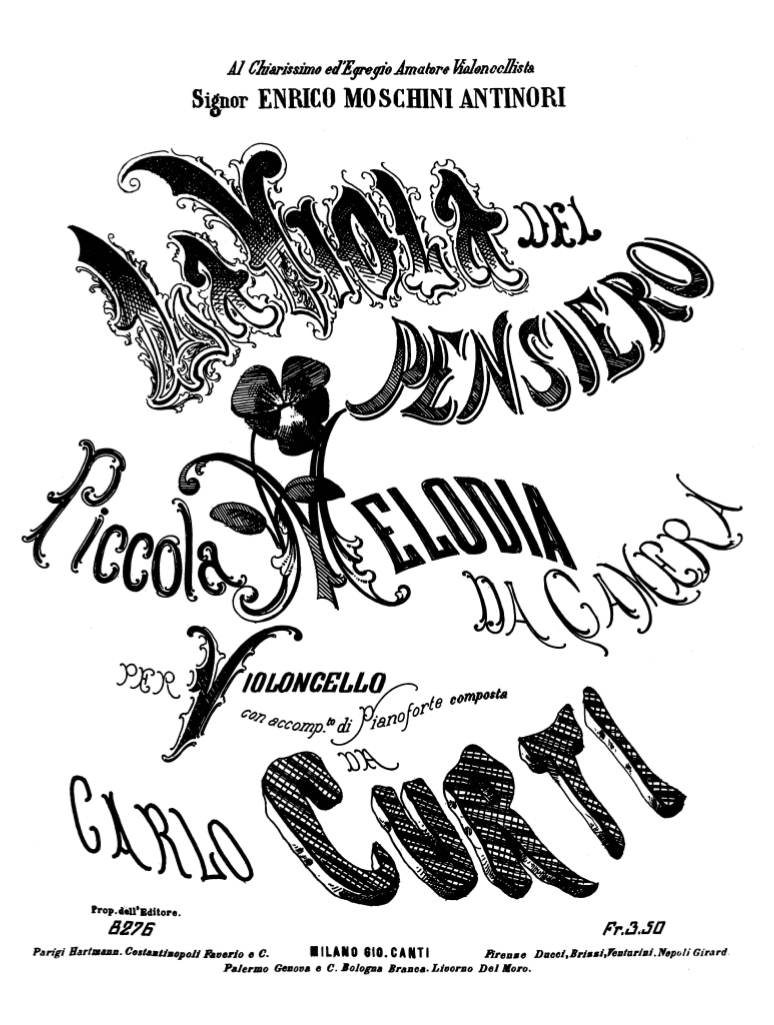
Cover of sheet music by Carlo Curti, La Viola del Pensiero, c.1850.

Carlo Curti (4 November 1807 - 29 December 1872) was a Bolognese Italian cellist, educator and composer. He studied violin under Rolla (possibly Antonio Rolla), and then the cello under Parisini. He was made professor at the Liceo di Musica (the Royal School of Music in Parma) as a young man and in May 1838 became First Cello in the Teatro Regio in Parma when it was led by Nicola De Giovanni. He retired to Bologna, his home town and birthplace, in 1871 or 1872 and died from a cardiac condition caused by pneumonia soon after. The 17 May 1838 issue of the music journal Teatri Art E Letteratura pointed to him as him an example of Italian musical excellence, a gift to the world.

== Works ==
Curti composed and arranged works for the cello and piano:

- Souvenir sur La Sonnambula variato Vioncello
- Divertimento dell'opera 'Il Trovatore'
- Ricordanze dell' Opera L'Africana di Meyerbeer
- Variate ricordanze dell'opera 'Un Ballo in Maschera'
- La Viola del Pensiero
- Il Pianto d'amore
- Il Ferito morente per la patria
- Rimembranze : melodie variate sull'opera La sonnambula del celebre m. Bellini
- Divertimento sopra l'opera Aroldo del cav. G. Verdi
- Ricordanze belliniane dell'opera Beatrice di Tenda
- Souvenir dell'opera Rigoletto del cav. sig. G. Verdi
- Variate ricordanze dell'opera Un Ballo in maschera del cav. G. Verdi
- Gran pezzo di bravura
- La pazza per amore : melodramma in due atti da rappresentarsi nel Teatro comunale di Bologna il carnevale del 1835 al 1836 / parole di Giacomo Ferretti; musica del maestro p. Antonio Coppolaw
- Clotilde : melodramma giocoso da rappresentarsi nel gran Teatro della Comune il carnevale del 1836-37 / [La musica è del rinomato sig. maestro Coccia]
- Danao Re d'Argo : melodramma in due atti da rappresentarsi in Bologna nel Gran Teatro della Comune la primavera dell'anno 1836
- Edoardo in Iscozia : dramma per musica in due atti da rappresentarsi nel Teatro Comunale di Bologna con ballo grande tragico intitolato Virginia nell'autunno dell'anno 1833 / [la poesia è del signor Gilardoni Domenico; la musica è del celebre maestro signor Coccia Carlo]
