= Cezar (footballer, born 1986) =

Brazilian footballer

Personal information
- Full name: Roberto Cezar Lima Acunha
- Date of birth: July 7, 1986 (age 40)
- Place of birth: Brazil
- Height: 1.79 m (5 ft 10 1/2 in)
- Position: Midfielder

Senior career*
Years	Team	Apps	(Gls)
2005	Sagan Tosu	1	(0)
- * Club domestic league appearances and goals

Roberto Cezar Lima Acunha (born July 7, 1986) is a former Brazilian football player.

== Playing career ==
He played for J2 League club Sagan Tosu in 2005 season. On August 6, he debuted in J2 League against Vegalta Sendai. However he could only play this match and left the club end of the season.

== Club statistics ==
Club performance			League		Cup		Total	
Season	Club	League	Apps	Goals	Apps	Goals	Apps	Goals
Japan			League		Emperor's Cup		Total	
2005	Sagan Tosu	J2 League	1	0				
Country	Japan		1	0				
Total			1	0				
