= Kurti, Tripura =

Village in Tripura, India

Coordinates: 24°29′01″N 92°13′48″E

Kurti is a village in Kadamtala tehsil, in North Tripura district of Tripura, India. It is one of twenty villages in Kadamtala Block, near the villages Piarachhara and Sarala.

The male population is 5146, and the female population is 5137, for a total population of 10283.
