= César Curti =

Brazilian model, Mister International 2011, international male pageant winner

César Augusto Curti
- Born: César Augusto Curti; March 19, 1987 (age 39); Ribeirão Preto, Brazil
- Occupations: Model, actor, musician
- Height: 1.87 m (6 ft 1 1/2 in)
- Beauty pageant titleholder
- Title: Mister International Brasil 2011; Mister International 2011
- Hair color: Black
- Eye color: Brown
- Major competitions: Mister Brasil 2011 (Mister International Brasil); Mister International 2011 (Winner)

César Augusto Curti (born March 19, 1987) is a Brazilian model and male pageant winner who was crowned Mister International 2011 at Patravadi Theatre in The Garden, Bangkok, Thailand. He is the second Brazilian to win Mister International in the history of the pageant.

== Pageantry ==
=== Mister Brasil 2011 ===
Curti was among the top three out of 20 finalists at the Mister Brasil 2011 pageant, held at the Hotel Novo Frade, Río de Janeiro, Brasil on May 8, 2011. By the end of the event, he was crowned Mister International Brasil.

=== Mister International 2011 ===
Curti was crowned as Mister International 2011 at Patravadi Theatre in The Garden, Bangkok, Thailand on December 17, 2011. He competed against 32 contestants at the pageant to get the title of Mister International.

== Later career ==
In 2012, Curti competed on and won The Amazing Race: Edição Brasil with his friend Daniel Belém. In 2015, Curti created his own mix of meditation and martial arts, named Mahamudra (following the homonymous Buddhist concept).

Awards and achievements
Preceded by (United Kingdom) Ryan Terry	Mister International; 2011	Succeeded by (Lebanon) Ali Hammoud
Preceded by Caio Lucius Ribeiro	Mister International Brasil; 2011	Succeeded by Ricardo Macêdo Magryno
