= Aldo Curti =

Italian footballer (born 1926)

Personal information
- Date of birth: 12 March 1926
- Place of birth: Montevarchi, Kingdom of Italy
- Position: Midfielder

Senior career*
Years	Team	Apps	(Gls)
1946–1947	Montevarchi		
1947–1948	Roma	1	(0)
1948–1950	Parma	28	(0)
- * Club domestic league appearances and goals

Aldo Curti (born 12 March 1926) is an Italian retired professional football player.

Curti played one game in Serie A, for A.S. Roma in the 1947/48 season.
