= Çezar Kurti =

Albanian translator (1935–2013)

Çezar Kurti (1935 – 10 December 2013) was an Albanian translator, known for his many contributions to Albanian literature.

== Biography ==
Çezar Kurti was born in Kavajë, Albania, in 1935. After completing his studies in Russian language and literature, Mr. Kurti worked as an editor/translator for the Albanian Telegraphic Agency. He was appointed professor of Russian at the University of Tirana and became Chairman of the Russian Department there. In 1976, charged with disseminating anticommunist propaganda, professor Kurti was dismissed from the University and was sent to the copper mines of Kurbnesh, in Mirdita. From 1976, when he published his Albanian translation of John Galsworthy's The Forsyte Salvation, until 1985, professor Kurti was not allowed to publish his work. With the help of his friends, he published his Albanian translation of Aeschylus's Prometheus Bound and Antoine de Saint-Exupéry's Wind, Sand and Stars. In 1989, he edited Tolstoy's War and Peace. In 1992 he co-authored the English-Albanian Polytechnical Vocabulary. In 1993 he published a translation of Shakespeare's sonnets into Albanian and in 1994, F. Dostoyevsky's Records from the House of the Dead. His verse translation of Dante's Inferno has been published only in excerpts. In 1998 he has also published Bashkebisedues Shqip anglisht (Albanian–English Conversations).

Kurti focused on translating works by poets and writers such as Aeschylus, Dante, Dostoyevsky, Chalamov, and Havel to underscore his opposition to the violence exercised against human rights in his country and to contribute to the establishment of democratic thinking in Albania.

Kurti later resided in New York City, where he continued to write and translate works into Albanian. His book Learn Albanian sold in record numbers. His books are used in several American and British universities.

Çezar Kurti died on 10 December 2013.
