= List of auxiliary bishops of Passau =

This is a list of the auxiliary bishops (suffragan bishops) of the diocese of Passau, in Bavaria and then in western (upper) Austria. The diocese was extremely large, until the establishment of the diocese of Vienna in 1469. For the ecclesiastical history of the diocese, see Roman Catholic Diocese of Passau.

== Auxiliary bishops ==
...

- Petrus Marchopolensis (attested 1363)
- Ortolfus de Alzenbruck, O.P. (attested 1345)

...

- Simon of Vienna, O.E.S.A., Bishop of Kastoria (Greece) (attested 1380–1390)

...

- Matthias de Krumpnau (attested 1430)
- Johannes (1441–1465)
- Sigismund Pirchan von Rosenberg, O. Cist. (1441–1472)
- Benedikt Sibenhirter, O.S.B. (1452–1458)
- Wolfgang Püchler, O.F.M. (1465–1475)
- Albert Schönhofer (1473–1493)
- Andreas Weinmair (1477–1491)
- Nikolaus Kaps (1491–1499) Appointed, Auxiliary Bishop of Gurk
- Bernhard Meurl von Leombach (1496–1526)
- Heinrich Kurz (1526–1557)
- Thomas Murner, O.F.M. (1530–1536)
- Urban Sagstetter (1553–1556)
- Erasmus Pagendorfer (1557–1561)
- Michael Englmayr (1561–1568)
- Christian Krypper (1570–1573)
- Hector Wegmann (1575–1589)
- Christoph Weilhamer (1589–1597)
- Andreas Hofmann (bishop) (1597–1604)
- Blasius Laubich (1604–1608)
- Šimun Bratulić, O.S.P.P.E. (1598–1601)
- Johannes Brenner (bishop) (1608–1629)
- Johannes Kaspar Stredele (1631–1642)
- Johannes Bartholomäus Kobolt von Tambach (1637–1645)
- Nikolaus Aliprandi de Thomasis (1642)
- Ulrich Grappler von Trappenburg (1646–1658)
- Martin Geiger (1658–1669)
- Jodok Brendt Hopner (1670–1682)
- Johannes Maximus Stainer von Pleinfelden (1682–1692)
- Johann Raymund Guidobald von Lamberg, O.F.M. Cap. (1701–1725)
- Franciscus Aloysius von Lamberg (1725–1732)
- Anton Joseph von Lamberg (1733–1747)
- Ermest Amadeus Thomas von Attems (1735–1742)
- Johannes Christoph Ludwig von Kuenburg (1747–1756)
- Philipp Wirich Lorenz von Daun zu Sassenheim und Callenborn (1757–1763)
- Joseph Adam Arco (1764–1773)
- Franz Karl Maria Cajetan von Firmian (1773–1776)
- Thomas Johann Kaspar von Thun und Hohenstein (1776–1795) Appointed, Bishop of Passau
- Leopold Maximilian von Firmian (Frimian) (1797–1800)
- Karl Kajetan von Gaisruck (Gaysruck) (1801–1818)
- Adalbert von Pechmann (1824–1860)
- Franz Xaver Eder (1977–1984) Appointed, Coadjutor Bishop of Passau; Bishop of Passau, 1984–2001.

== See also ==
- Roman Catholic Diocese of Passau (main article)

== Sources ==
- Hansiz, Marcus. Germaniae sacræ: Metropolis Lauriacensis cum Episcopatu Pataviensi. (in Latin). Tomus I (1727). Augusta Vindelicorum (Augsburg): Happach & Schlüter.
- Schrödl, Karl (1879). Passavia sacra: Geschichte des Bisthums Passau bis zur Säkularisation des Fürstenthums Passau. (in German) Hauptband. 1. Passau: Waldbauer 1879.

=== External links ===
- Cheney, David M. Catholic Hierarchy.org.; retrieved: 2 November 2023.
- Lins, Joseph (1911). "Passau, diocese of." In: The Catholic Encyclopedia. Ed. Charles Hebermann. Volume 11 New York: Appleton, 1911, PP. 519-521.
