= Kurtz (surname) =

Kurtz is a surname, mainly a German and Jewish (Ashkenazic/Yiddish), meaning someone who is short in height. It comes from the German word 'kurz' meaning 'short'. Variant: Kurz. Notable people with the surname include:

- Jacob Kurz von Senftenau (or Latin: Jacob Curtius; Czech: Jakub Kurz ze Senftenavy), Imperial pro-chancellor for Rudolph II
- Adolf Kurz (1888–1959), German wrestler
- Bastian Kurz (born 1996), German football midfielder
- Bob Kurtz (animator), director, producer, artist, and designer, primarily in film and TV commercials
- Bob Kurtz (broadcaster), American sportscaster
- David B. Kurtz (1819–1898), American politician in California
- Edmund Kurtz (1908–2004), Russian-born Australian cellist and music editor
- Efrem Kurtz (1900–1995), conductor
- Erwin Kurz (1846–1901), President of the Swiss National Council (1887/1888)
- Eugene Kurtz (1923–2006), American composer
- Federico Kurtz (1854–1920), German-Argentine botanist
- Frank Kurtz (1911–1996), diver and aviator
- Frank Kurtz (director), American film director and comics writer
- Fred Kurz (1918–1978), English football player
- Gary Kurtz, American film producer (Star Wars)
- George Kurtz American cybersecurity entrepreneur
- Gerdina Hendrika Kurtz (1899–1989), Dutch historian, writer and archivist
- Glenn Kurtz (born 1962), American writer
- Hal Kurtz (born 1943), baseball player
- Heinrich Kurz (died 1557), Roman Catholic Auxiliary Bishop of Passau
- Heinz D. Kurz (born 1946), Austrian professor of economics
- Hermann Kurz (1813–1873), German poet and novelist
- Howard Kurtz (born 1953), American journalist, author and media critic
- Ilona Kurz (1899–1975), Czech concert pianist and professor
- Irma Kurtz (born 1935), American-born UK-based agony aunt
- Isolde Kurz (1853–1944), German poet and short story writer
- Jacob Banks Kurtz (1867–1960), US Congressman from Pennsylvania
- Jeff Kurtz (born 1954), American politician
- Jerry Kurz (born 1949), one of the earliest leaders of Arena football
- Johann Kurz (1913–1985), Roman Catholic Presbyter and schoolmaster of the Archbishop seminary Hollabrun
- Johann Heinrich Kurtz (1809–1890), German Lutheran theologian
- Josef Kurz, or Josef Kruz (1889-?), Czech sports shooter
- Joseph Kurtz (born 1964), engineer and builder
- Joseph Edward Kurtz (born 1946), Roman Catholic Archbishop of Louisville, Kentucky
- Justin Kurtz (born 1977), Canadian ice hockey player
- Karl Friedrich Kurz (1878–1962), Swiss-German-Norwegian novelist
- Katherine Kurtz (born 1944), American fantasy author
- Kurt Kurz (1927–2013), Austrian ice hockey player
- Lucy Kurtz (1861–1937), wife of Douglas Hyde, 1st President of Ireland
- Marco Kurz (born 1969), German footballer
- Maxine Kurtz (1921–2009), American city planner
- Michael L. Kurtz (born 1941), American historian
- Mike Kurtz (c. 1845–1904), American burglar and gang leader in New York City
- Nick Kurtz (born 2003), American baseball player
- Nico Kurz (born 1997), German darts player
- Oliver Kurtz (born 1971), German hockey player
- Otto Kurz (1908–1975), Austrian historian
- Paul Kurtz (1925–2012), American philosopher and skeptic
- Robert Kurz (born 1985), American basketball player
- Robert Kurz (philosopher) (1943–2012), German Marxist, social critic and editor of the journal Exit!
- Rosemary Kurtz (born 1930), American educator and politician
- Rudolf Friedrich Kurz (1818–1871), Swiss painter of native Americans
- Samuel Kurtz, Welsh politician
- Sanne Kurz (born 1974), German cinematographer
- Sarah Kurtz, American solar cell researcher
- Scott Kurtz, author of the webcomic Player Vs. Player
- Selma Kurz (1874–1933), Austrian operatic soprano
- Stanley Kurtz, contributing editor for National Review Online
- Stephen G. Kurtz, American historian
- Steve Kurtz (1958–2025), American performance artist
- Swoosie Kurtz (born 1944), American actress, daughter of Frank
- Thomas Kurz (born 1988), German football player
- Thomas Eugene Kurtz (1928–2024), computer scientist, co-developed the BASIC programming language
- Toni Kurz (1913–1936), German mountain climber
- Vilém Kurz (1872–1945), Czech pianist and renowned piano teacher
- Werner Kurz, Canadian researcher on climate change accountability
- Wilhelm Sulpiz Kurz (1834–1878), German botanist and garden director
- William Kurtz (photographer) (1833–1904), German-American photographer based in New York City
- William Henry Kurtz (1804–1868), US Congressman from Pennsylvania
- William Joseph Kurtz (1935–2023), Polish Roman Catholic prelate

== Fictional characters ==
- Kurtz (Heart of Darkness), novel character
- Colonel Kurtz, film character, from Apocalypse Now
