= Curtius =

Curtius may refer to:

== People ==
- Curtia gens, the clan to which the Curtii family belonged
  - Marcus Curtius, a noble of early Rome who rode his horse into the Lacus Curtius, which was then named after him
  - Quintus Curtius Rufus, 1st century CE historian
  - Curtius Rufus. 1st century CE politician, possibly the same as Quintus Curtius Rufus
- Curtius baronets, a title in the Baronetcy of England
- Albert Curtz (1600–1671), German astronomer and member of the Society of Jesus
- Alexander Curtius, Lithuanian nobleman and scholar
- Alfred Schulz-Curtius (1853–1918), a.k.a. Alfred Curtis, a German classical music impresario
- Dirk Donker Curtius (1792–1864), Dutch politician
- Ernst Robert Curtius (1886–1956), German scholar, philologist
- Ernst Curtius (1814–1896), German archaeologist, historian
- Georg Curtius (1820–1885), German philologist
- Jacob Curtius (1554–1594), Imperial Pro-Chancellor for Emperor Rudolph II, astronomer, mathematician and instrument maker
- Janus Henricus Donker Curtius (1813–1879), the last Dutch chief of Dejima, Japan
- Jean Curtius, also known as Jean De Corte and Juan Curcio (1551–1628), an industrialist from Liége
  - Curtius Museum, Jean Curtius's mansion, now a museum
- Julius Curtius (1877–1948), German politician
- Ludwig Curtius (1874–1954), archaeologist
- Philippe Curtius (1737–1794), Swiss physician and wax modeller; uncle and teacher of Marie Tussaud
- Theodor Curtius (1857–1928), German chemical scientist
- Sir William Curtius FRS (1599–1678), German magistrate, official resident of the English Crown in the Holy Roman Empire

== Other uses ==
- Curtius (crater), a lunar crater
- Curtius (beer), a Belgian beer
- Curtius, a spring of the Aqua Claudia
- Curtius (bug), a genus of bugs in the family Coreidae

== See also ==
- Curti (disambiguation)
- Kurz (disambiguation)
- Kurtz (disambiguation)
- Buchner–Curtius–Schlotterbeck reaction, a chemical reaction
- Curcio, a parish in Lombardy
- Lacus Curtius, an ancient landmark in the Roman Forum
- LacusCurtius, a website specializing in ancient Rome
- Curtius rearrangement, a chemical reaction
- Ernst-Robert-Curtius-Preis, a literary prize of Germany
