= Kurzhals =

Kurzhals is a German-language surname. Notable people with the surname include:

- Christine Kurzhals (1950–1998), German politician
- Thomas Kurzhals (1953–2014), German musician

== See also ==
- Kurz
- Kurtz (disambiguation)
- Kurzer
- Kurtzer
