= Kurz =

Kurz is a German-language surname. Notable people with the surname include:

- Heinz D. Kurz (born 1946), Austrian economist
- Hermann Kurz (1813–1873), German poet and novelist
- Isolde Kurz (1853–1944), German poet and short story writer, daughter of Hermann
- Marco Kurz (born 1969), German footballer and manager
- Rob Kurz (born 1985), American basketball player
- Robert Kurz (philosopher) (1943–2012), German philosopher and publicist
- Sebastian Kurz (born 1986), Austrian politician, chancellor of Austria
- Selma Kurz (1874–1933), Austrian operatic soprano
- Siegfried Kurz (1930–2023), German composer, conductor and teacher
- Toni Kurz (1913–1936), German mountaineer
- Vilém Kurz (1872–1945), Czech pianist and piano teacher
- Wilhelm Adolfovich Kurz (1892–1938), Austrian-born Soviet official
- Wilhelm Sulpiz Kurz (1834–1878), German botanist

== See also ==
- Kurtz (disambiguation)
- Kurzer
- Kurtzer
- Kurzhals
