= Erik Grant Lea =

Norwegian ship-owner, banker, insurer and mill owner

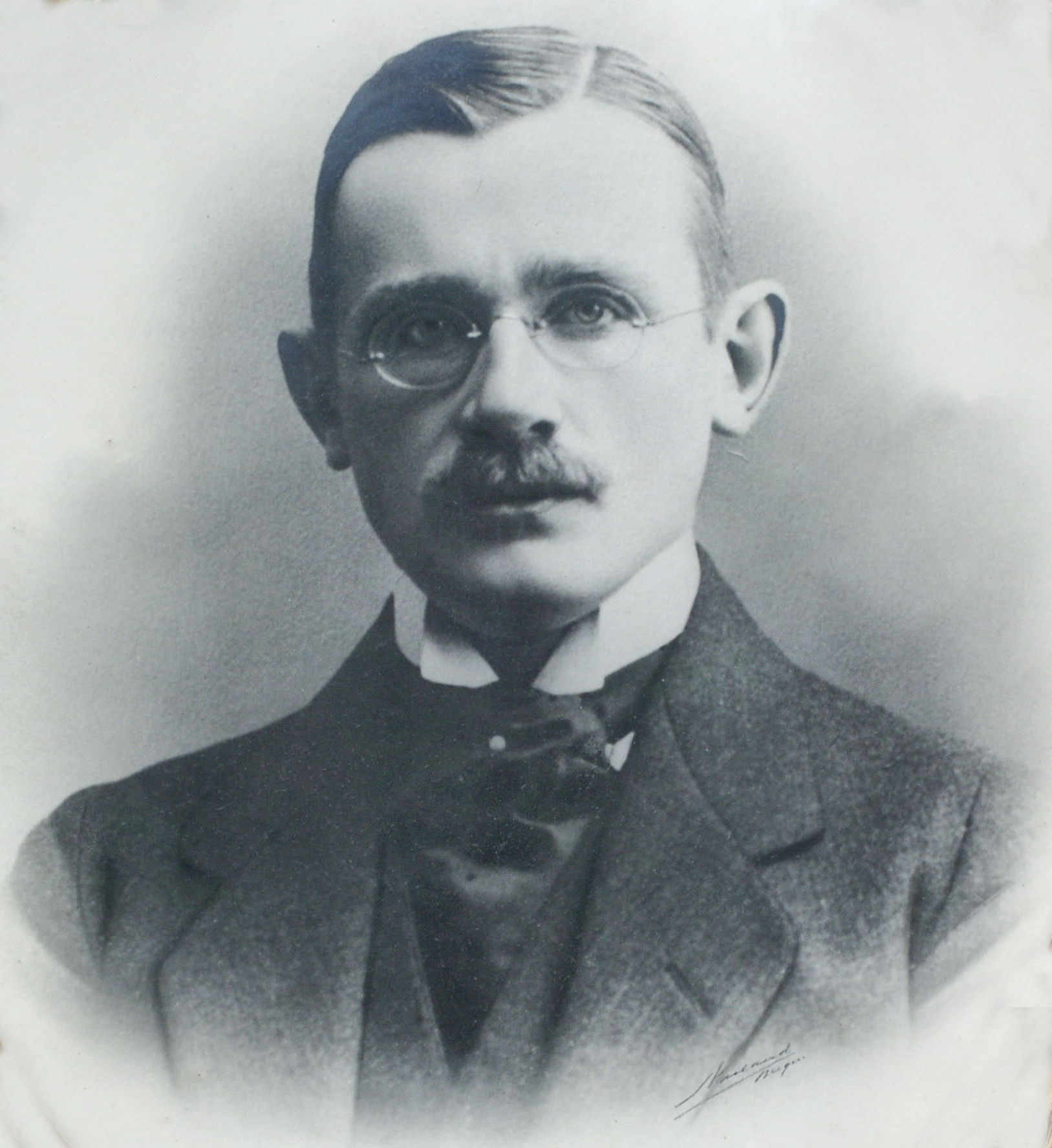
Erik Grant Lea at the top of his career, 1917

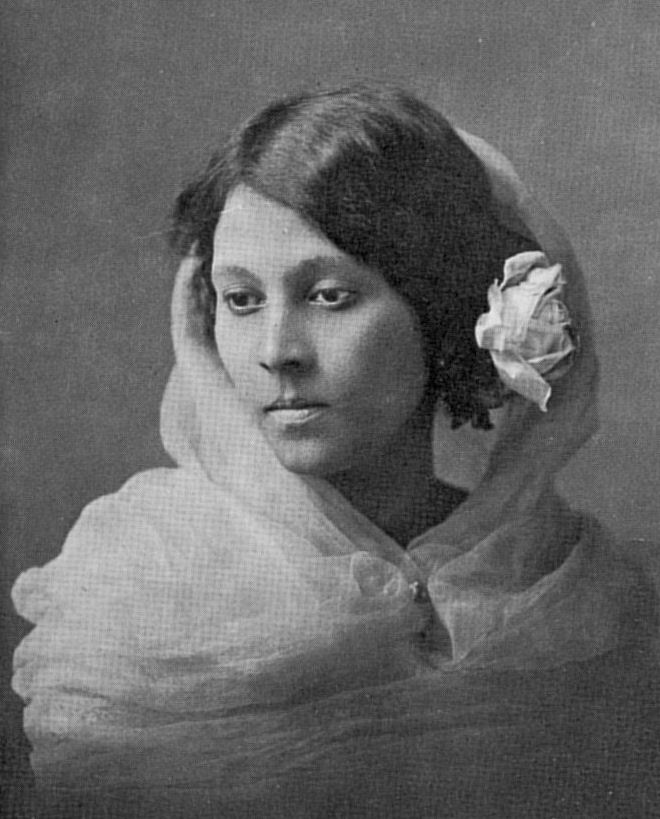
Hilda Lea, the spouse of Erik Grant Lea, 1917

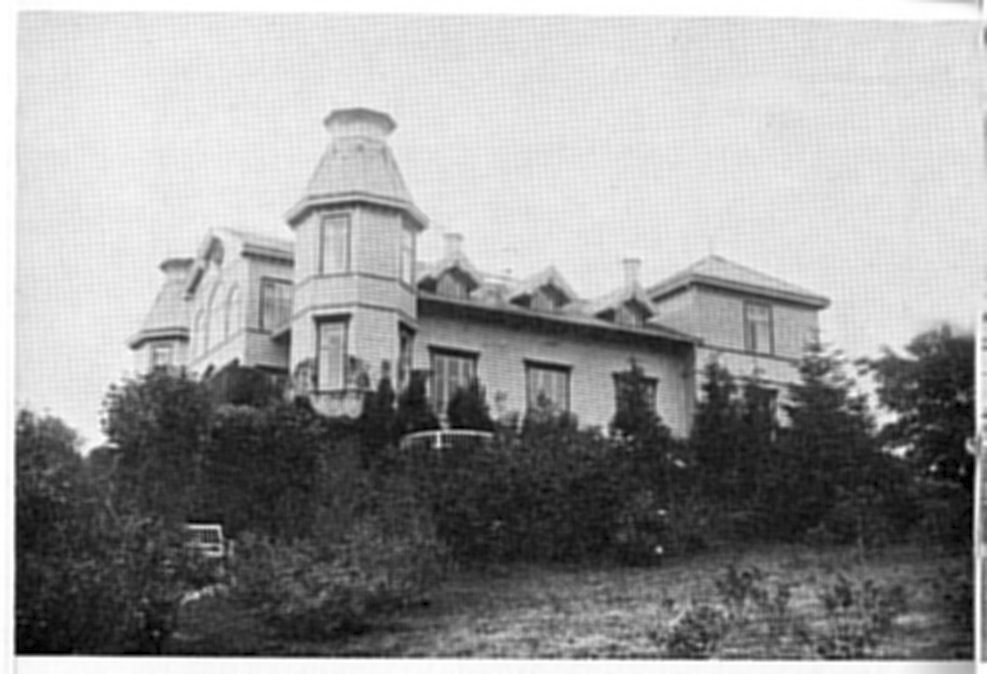
Lea Hall, now Solhaug school in Bergen. Surrounded by 8 acres (32,000 m^{2}) of park, 1917.

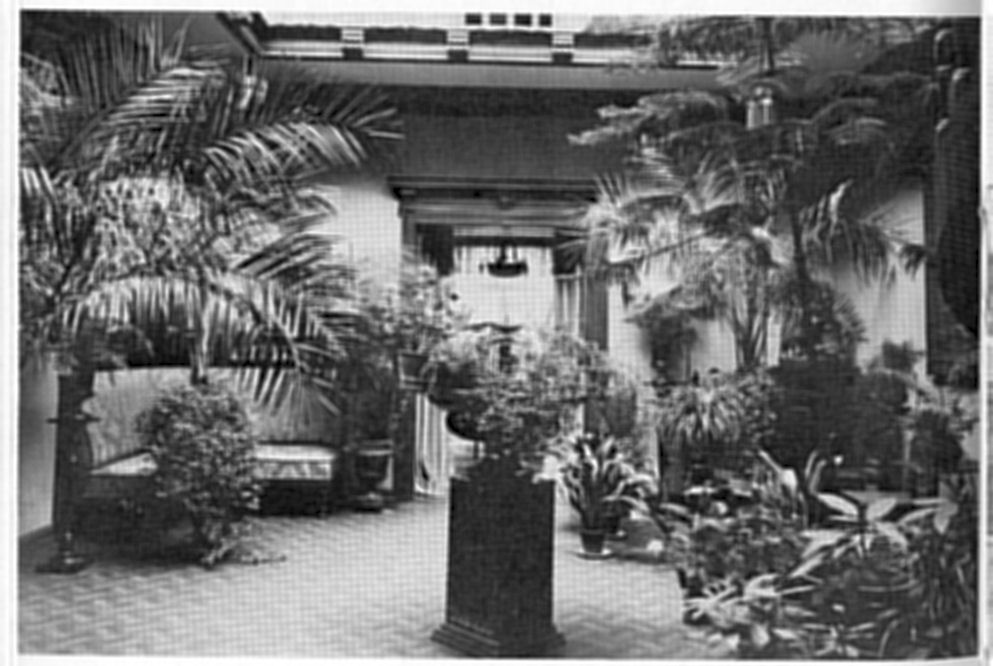
Lea Hall, the conservatory, 1917.

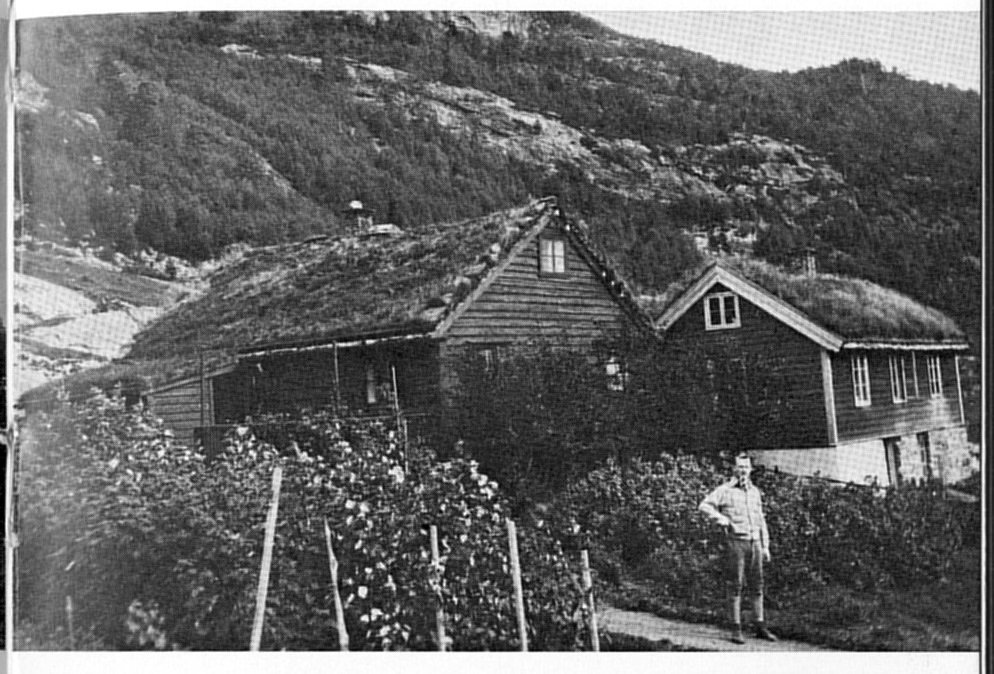
Left, the farmhouse, after being repaired he and his family moved into when arriving Gjølanger. The house to the right is a neighbouring building

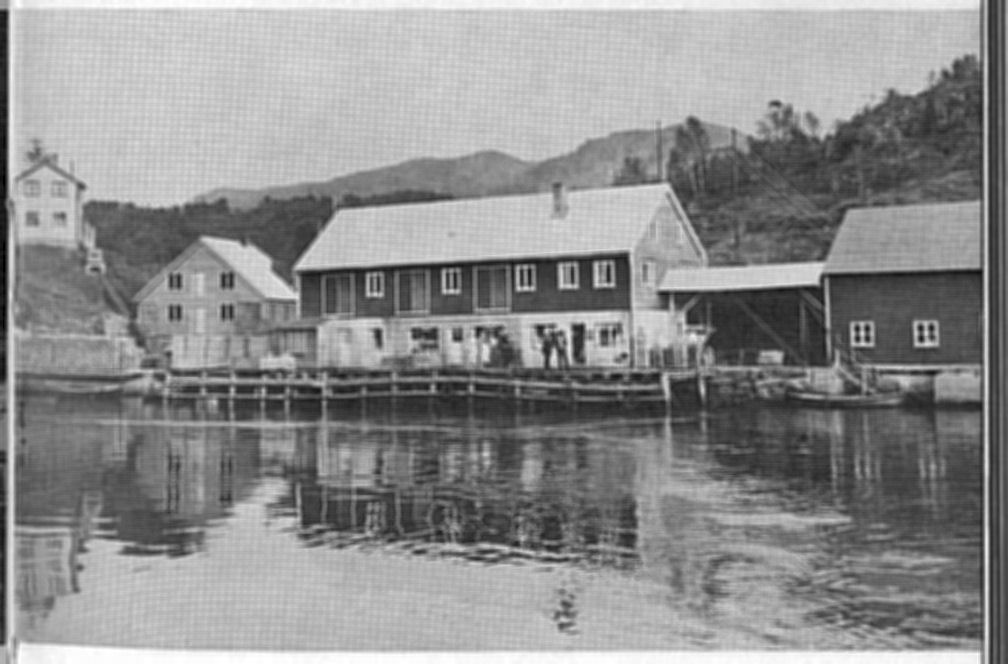
Gjølanger had evolved into the most significant place for ship arrivals in Dalsfjorden. Picture taken short after the rebuilding after the fire in 1950

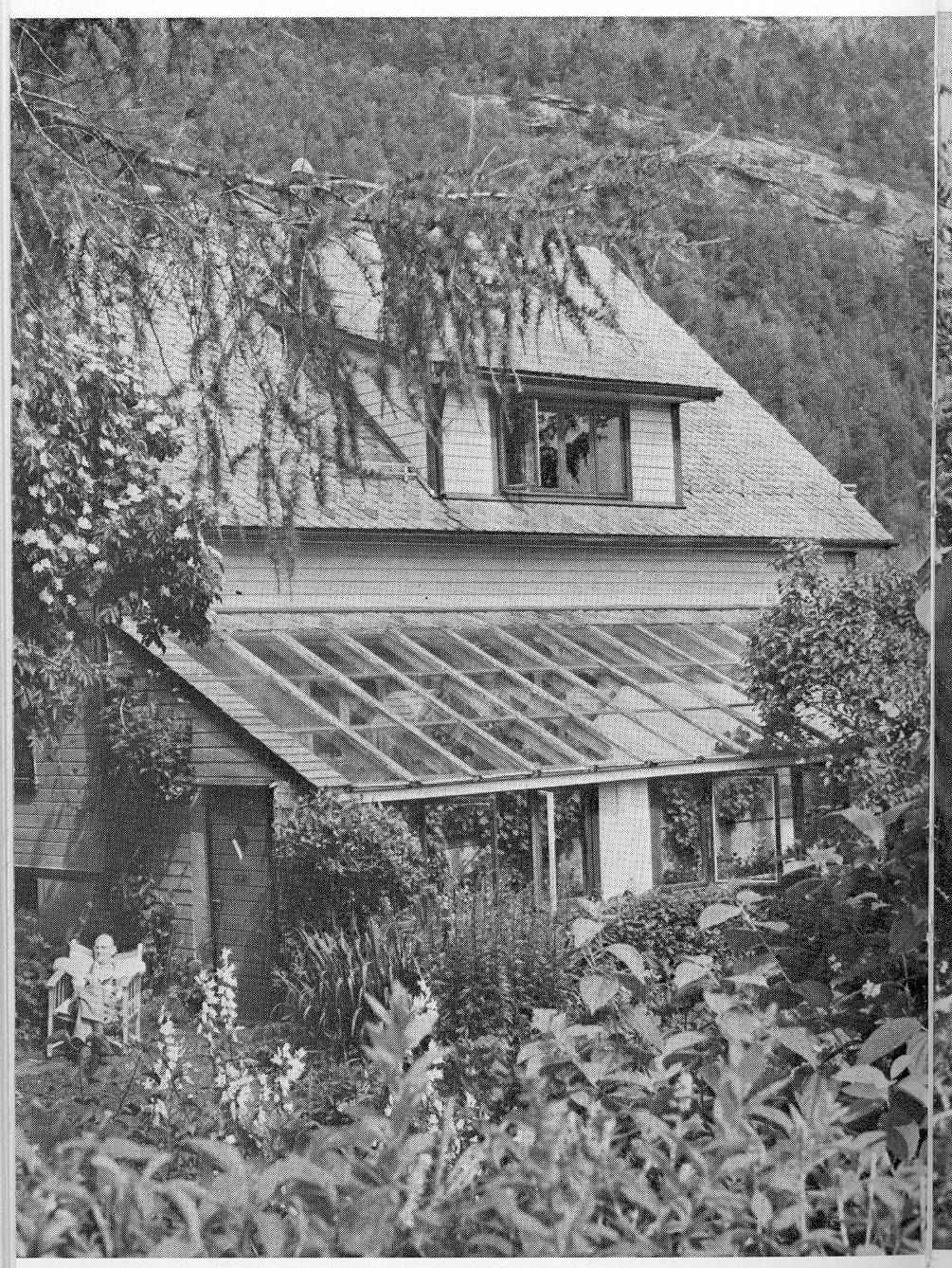
The residence in the early 1970. It is still there, but slightly deteriorated.

Erik Lawrence Grant Lea (October 15, 1892 – April 28, 1979) was a Norwegian ship-owner, banker, insurer and mill owner. He became one of the most mythical tycoons of the boom years of World War I in Norway.

== The myth ==
Those that grew up in Bergen after World War II could hardly avoid hearing the fairy tale about Lea, a fellow citizen, who became the richest ship owner in the world, married an Indian princess, and then lost everything and settled with his princess in some distant corner of Sognefjord.

== The reality ==
Behind this myth there was a turbulent life. In his days of wealth and power he owned 10 shipping companies, a bank and three insurance companies. His ships crossed oceans all over the world. He had 500 agents on three continents. In 1917 his agents signed 60,000 fire policies, insured the whole fishing fleet of Ålesund and little by little most of the Norwegian fleet. His spouse Hilda was no princess, but the daughter of a major and an Indian woman from a wealthy business family from Bangalore. In 1922 Lea lost everything and settled in Gjølanger in Fjaler Municipality in Sunnfjord, Sogn og Fjordane and had to start from scratch earning a living for himself and his family.

== Childhood ==
He was born in Bergen, Norway, the son of Lars Lea and Anna Bertine Magnussen, and married to Hilda Constance, née Connor, born 1889 in Bangalore, India, died 1960 in Fjaler Municipality, later remarried to Hildur Augusta Sørensdatter Tyssedal, born 1916 in Fjaler. He was the fifth of eight brothers and sisters, raised in a large apartment in Håkonsgate in Bergen. He attended the Hambro primary school up to age 14, when his father took him out of school and began to personally impart him a business education.

== Career ==
At sixteen he started working as a clerk, later employed by Kjær og Isdahl (Kjær and Isdahl), a substantial shipping business, where he was quickly promoted office manager. In 1914 he bought his first steam ship and in 1915 he started his own shipping company. In 1915–16 he bought and sold ships for 30 million NKr (approximately US$4.6 million). In 1917 he sold six of his companies to Bjørnstad og Brækhus, then founded Leas Assuranseseslskab A/S (Lea's Insurance Company Inc.). Shortly after he added the insurance companies Jupiter and National. He then founded Leas Aktie- og Bankierforretning A/S (Lea's Stock and Bankers Enterprise Inc.).

These operations were sold to a consortium for a substantial sum of money. He regretted the sale and bought them back a little later for about the same amount of money. In the meantime, as the wartime shipping bonanza ended, his companies ran into a crisis, and were declared bankrupt by 1921. In 1922 Bergens Kreditbank foreclosed on his home (now Solhaug school) and the 10 acres (40,000 m^{2}) surrounding of land.

== A new start, another life ==
After his bankruptcy he moved to a little, but still operating saw mill in Gjølanger (Fjaler municipality, Sogn og Fjordane county), which his creditors had not attacked. He built a dam to float timber to the mill and a salmon ladder. He also established a grain mill, a grocery shop, a steam ship quay, a telephone line and a power station. He also operated a lime kiln in Smilden, on the north bank of Åfjorden (a fjord), between Hyllestad and Sørbøvåg. It was a hard life with little sleep. While building a new house for himself in Gjøanger he lived in Hellevik and had to walk the distance of five kilometers twice each day. From Hellevik to the Smilden kiln the distance was 20 km along a footpath. He also started a forestry operation. By the beginning of the 60's, some 30 years later, he had planted altogether 200,000 spruce trees.

== From the bottom again ==
After the Second World War, his new businesses slowly kept growing. In the more or less roadless Dalsfjorden area, Gjølanger became the place with the most frequent steam ship arrivals. But in 1951 the mill, the power plant, and the shop were all destroyed by fire. He was underinsured and once again had to start from almost zero, with some insurance money and help from his fellow villagers. His wife Hilda died suddenly in 1960. His daughter from his first marriage, Sunniva, married Johannes Gaussereide. He later married Hildur Tyssedal, who had been employed in his shop.

== Public contributions ==
At the top of his career about 1916–17, he bought land in the outskirts of Bergen. The land near his residence, Lea Hall, he bought to build one family houses with garden for workers. He made development plans for the area. The area and plan was sold to the public authorities for a modest sum of money. The plans were later partly realized. He engaged architect Schumann Olsen to make a development plan for a garden suburb at Finnebergåsen. Also this area was sold to the public authorities for a modest sum. His rights in Lake Solheim was given to the same public authorities without any compensation. He thus willfully forwent substantial wealth and a prospect of profits in favor of the public interests.

He also willingly contributed substantial sums of money to the benefit of refugees and catastrophe stricken people and to public benefit in Bergen city.

When the American Dr. Bentham died and left an invaluable collection of ethnic Indian artifacts, his widow tried to sell the collection. But no American museums were willing to pay the sum required. Lea then raised the money and bought the collection and donated it to Bergen Museum where the collection can be seen today.

== Other ==
Lea joined the Norwegian Home Guard immediately after the war and was an active officer until he approached eighty. He was educated in the military and was appointed as lieutenant. When 78 he accomplished the Niemegen march (as many times before). At 70 he was awarded the Idrettsmerket (the Athletics medal). He has also been awarded a number of distinctions and medals. He has also accomplished a number of other demanding marches.

In 1923, when 30, he converted to Catholicism and in 1938 he built his own private chapel at Gjølanger. The vicar in the Catholic parish in Bergen held masses there at Lea's birthday and 17 May, the national constitution day. The Nobel Prize winner, the Norwegian Catholic author Sigrid Undset was also his guest there.

Lea had emphatic cultural and literary interests. He had social connections with the Norwegian poet Jakob Sande who frequently visited Gjølanger, and the Swiss-German writer Karl Friedrich Kurz, who lived in Vårdal on the north side of Dalsfjorden facing Gjølanger.

Lea also wrote poetry himself.

He planted Sequoia gigantea trees. One of them has survived to this day and has reached a height of about 4 m. It is not in very good health, but is still growing.

He died in 1979 in Fjaler Municipality in Sogn og Fjordane county.

== Literary work ==
Erik Grant Lea: Røsslyng og Tanker 1970. Poems

Some poems in K. Stub og S. Osnes: Der Stillheten Gror, 1996.

== Gjølanger ==
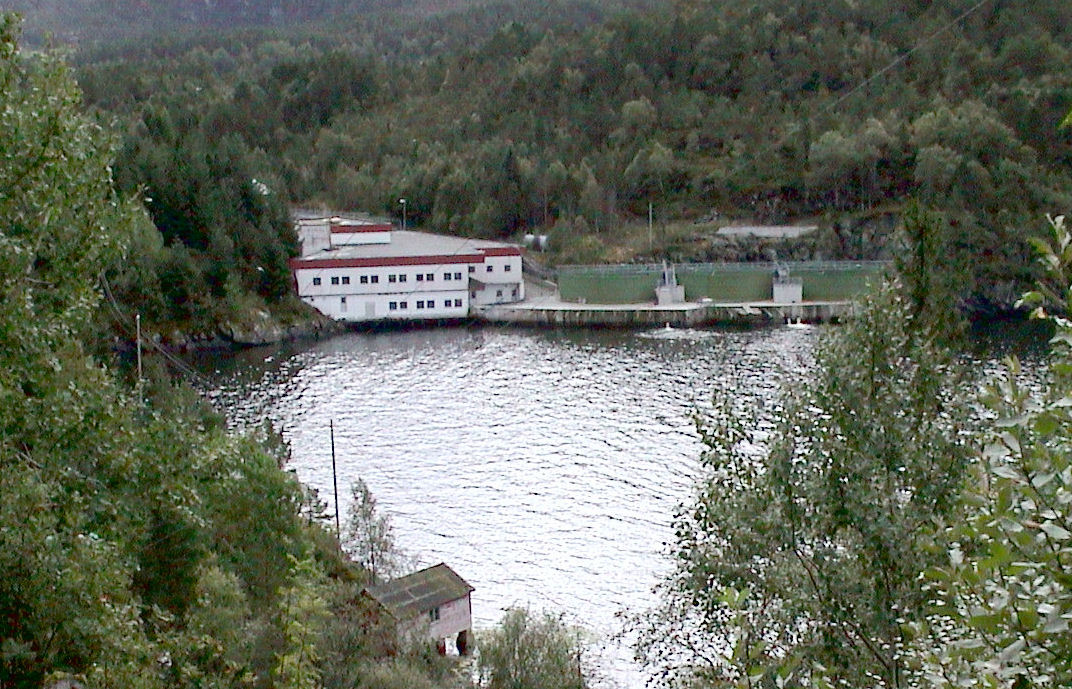
The quay in Gjølanger today. The old buildings are gone, the wooden structure built by Lea is replaced by a concrete construction. Today there is an aquaculture plant. 2002.

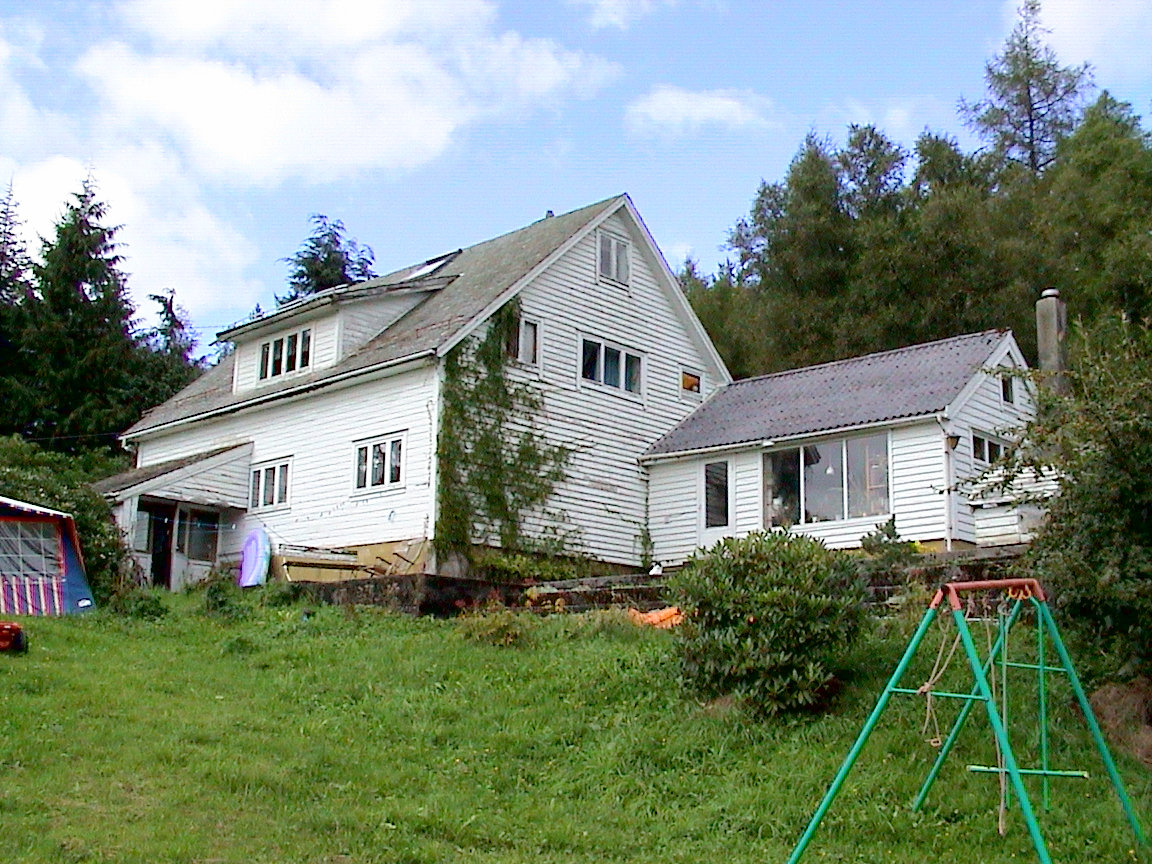
Lea's residence in Gjølanger in 2002. In his days the garden was flourishing.

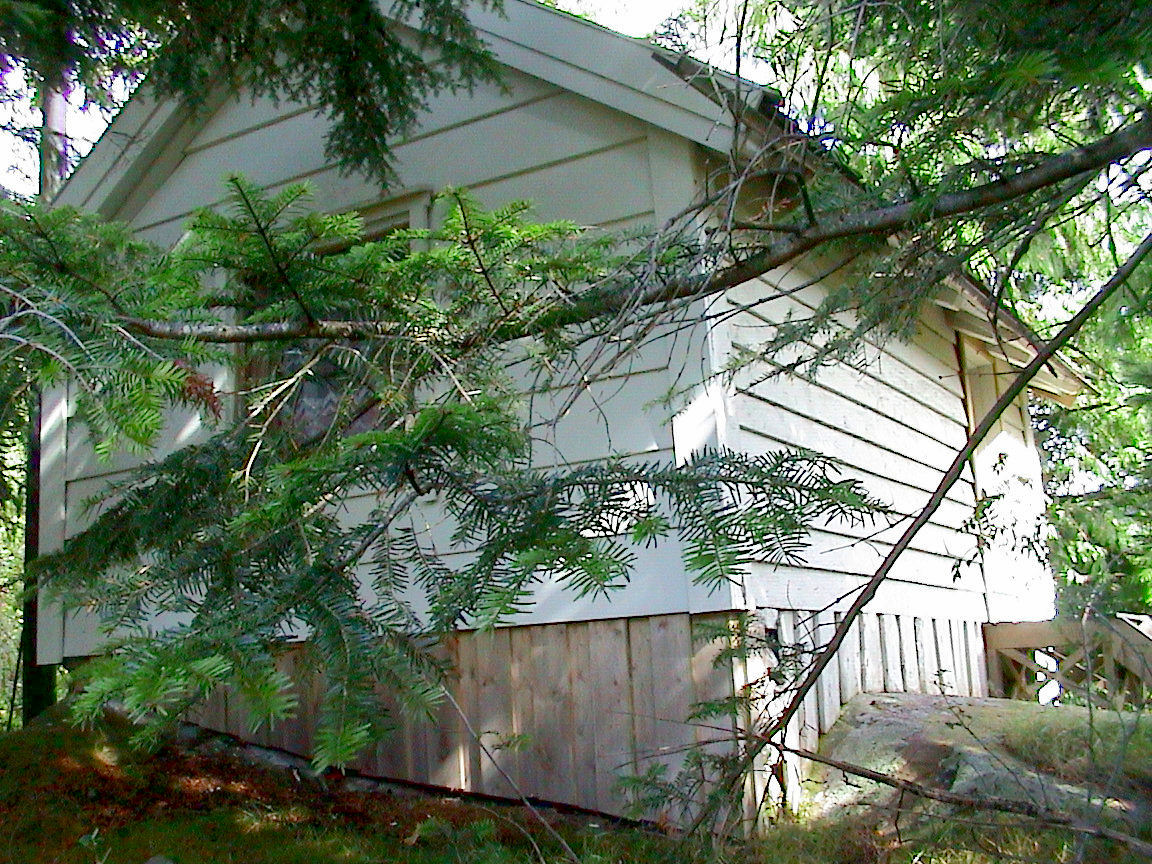
The chapel.

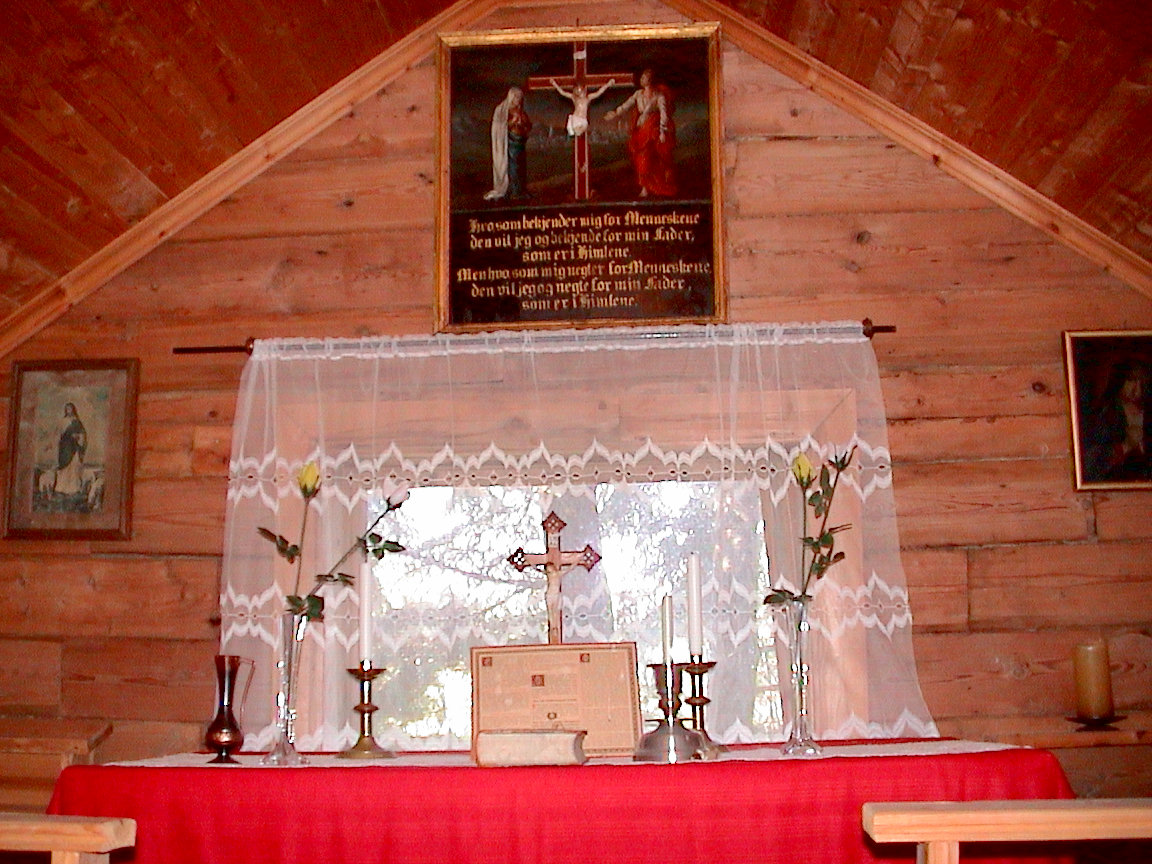
The altar.

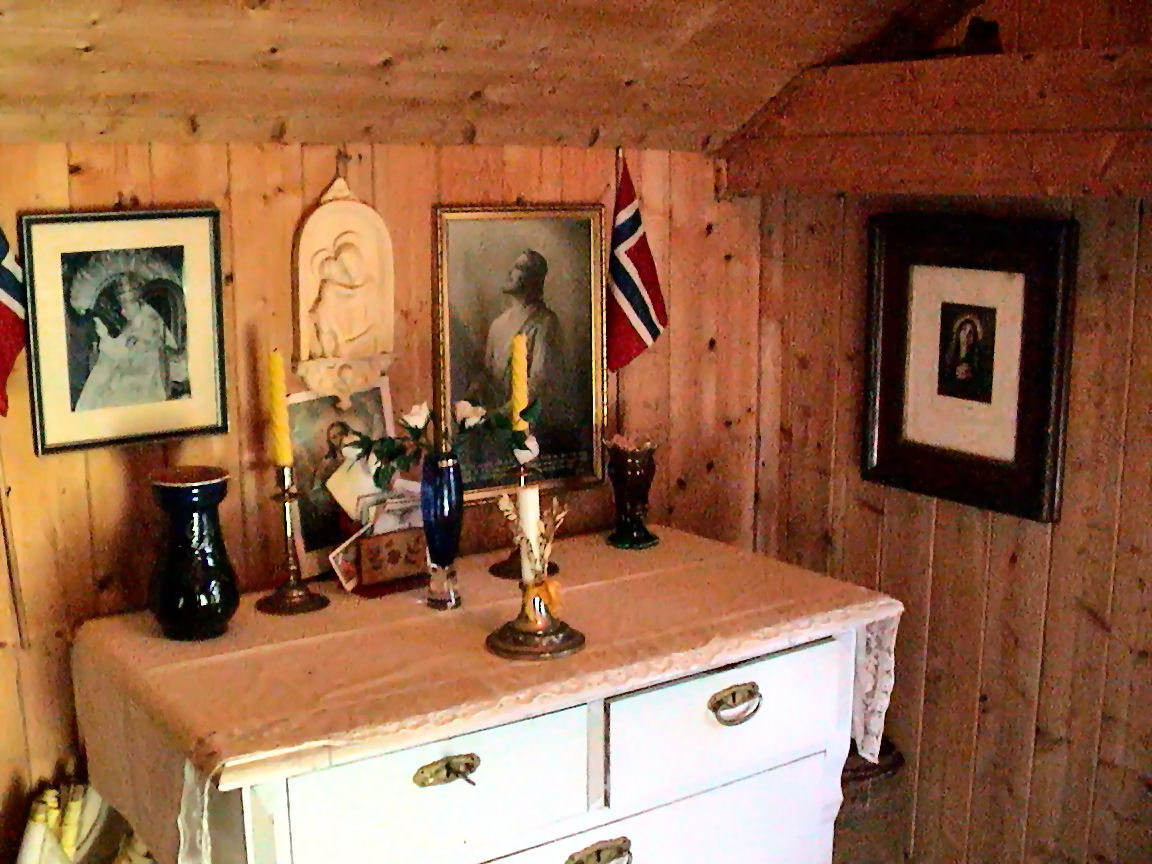
Chest of drawers for the outfit.

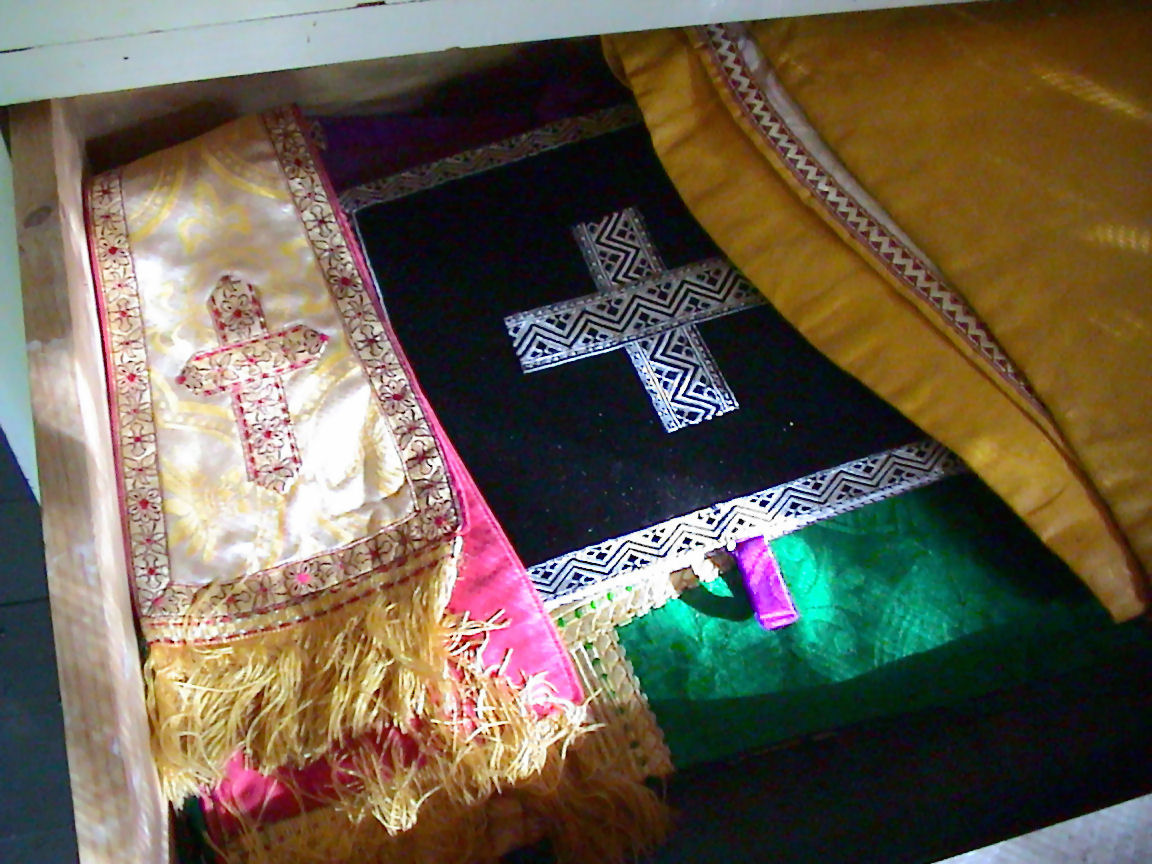
The outfit for the mass.

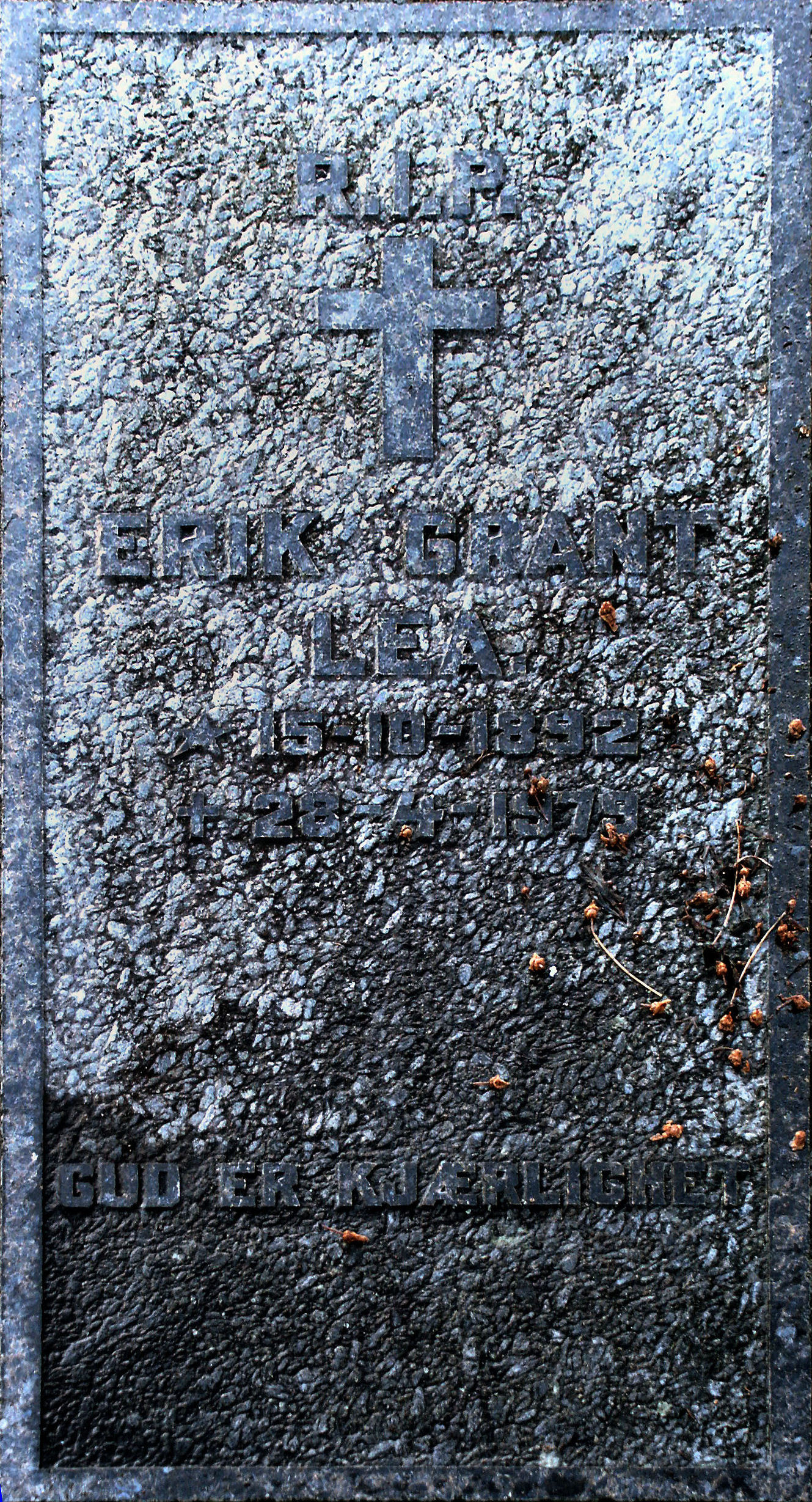
Lea's tombstone in the churchyard in Dale in Sunnfjord. By his side his first spouse Hilda Grant Lea, born Connor and his sister in law Dora Buchan, born Connor also are resting.

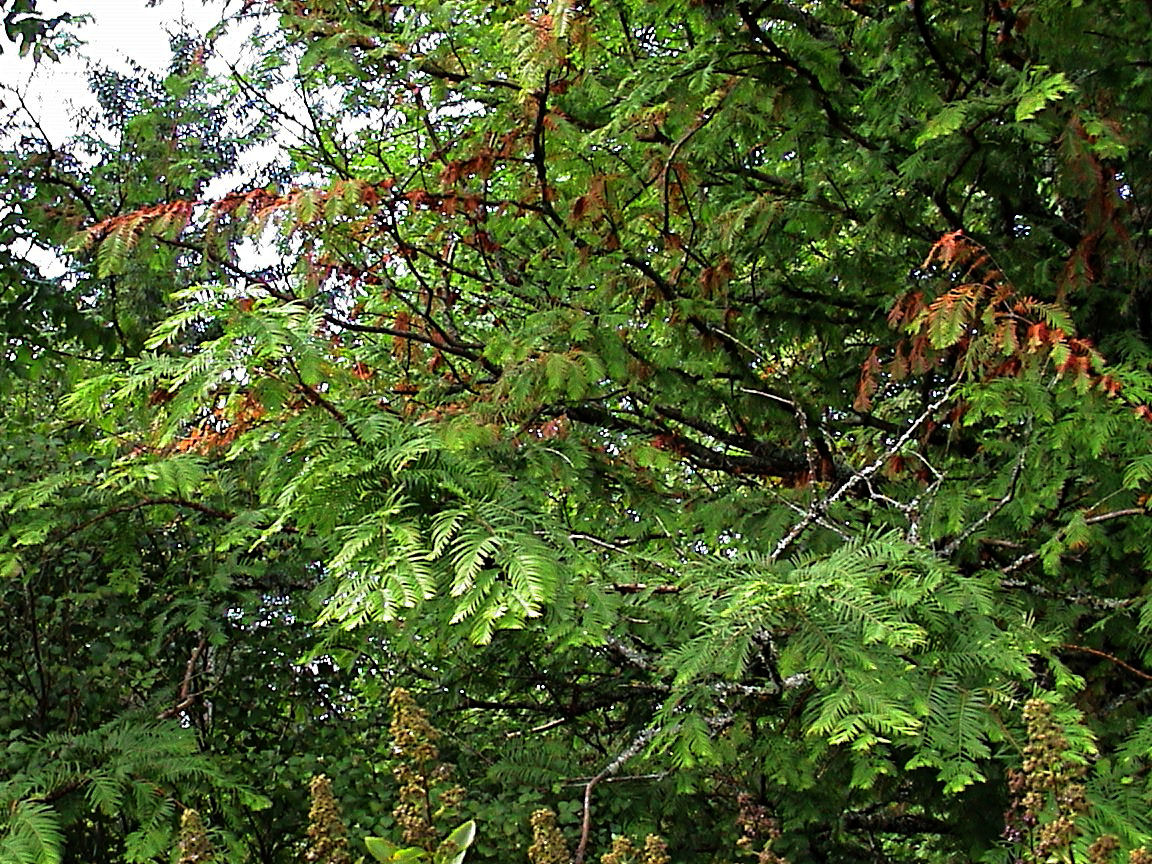
Sequoia Gigantea planted by Lea. Picture is taken 2002. The tree had reached a height of about 4 m, and had brown spots on its leaves.
