= Kurtz =

Kurtz may refer to:

== Name ==
- Kurtz (Heart of Darkness), main character of Joseph Conrad's novel Heart of Darkness
- Colonel Kurtz, main antagonist in the 1979 film Apocalypse Now
- Kurtz (surname)

== Places ==
=== United States ===
- Kurtz, Indiana
- Kurtz, Michigan
- Kurtz Township, Minnesota
- Kurtz's Mill Covered Bridge, Lancaster County, Pennsylvania

== See also ==
- Kurz (disambiguation)
- 6629 Kurtz, a main-belt asteroid
- Kurtzer
