= Michael Englmayr =

Most Reverend Michael Englmayr
- Auxiliary Bishop of Passau; Titular Bishop of Symbalia
- Church: Catholic Church
- Diocese: Diocese of Passau
- In office: 1561–1568

Personal details
- Died: 13 July 1568 Passau, Germany

Michael Englmayr (died 1568) was a Roman Catholic prelate who served as Auxiliary Bishop of Passau (1561–1568).

== Biography ==
On 24 Mar 1561, Michael Englmayr was appointed during the papacy of Pope Pius IV as Auxiliary Bishop of Passau and Titular Bishop of Symbalia. He served as Auxiliary Bishop of Passau until his death on 13 Jul 1568.
