= Curtius (beer) =

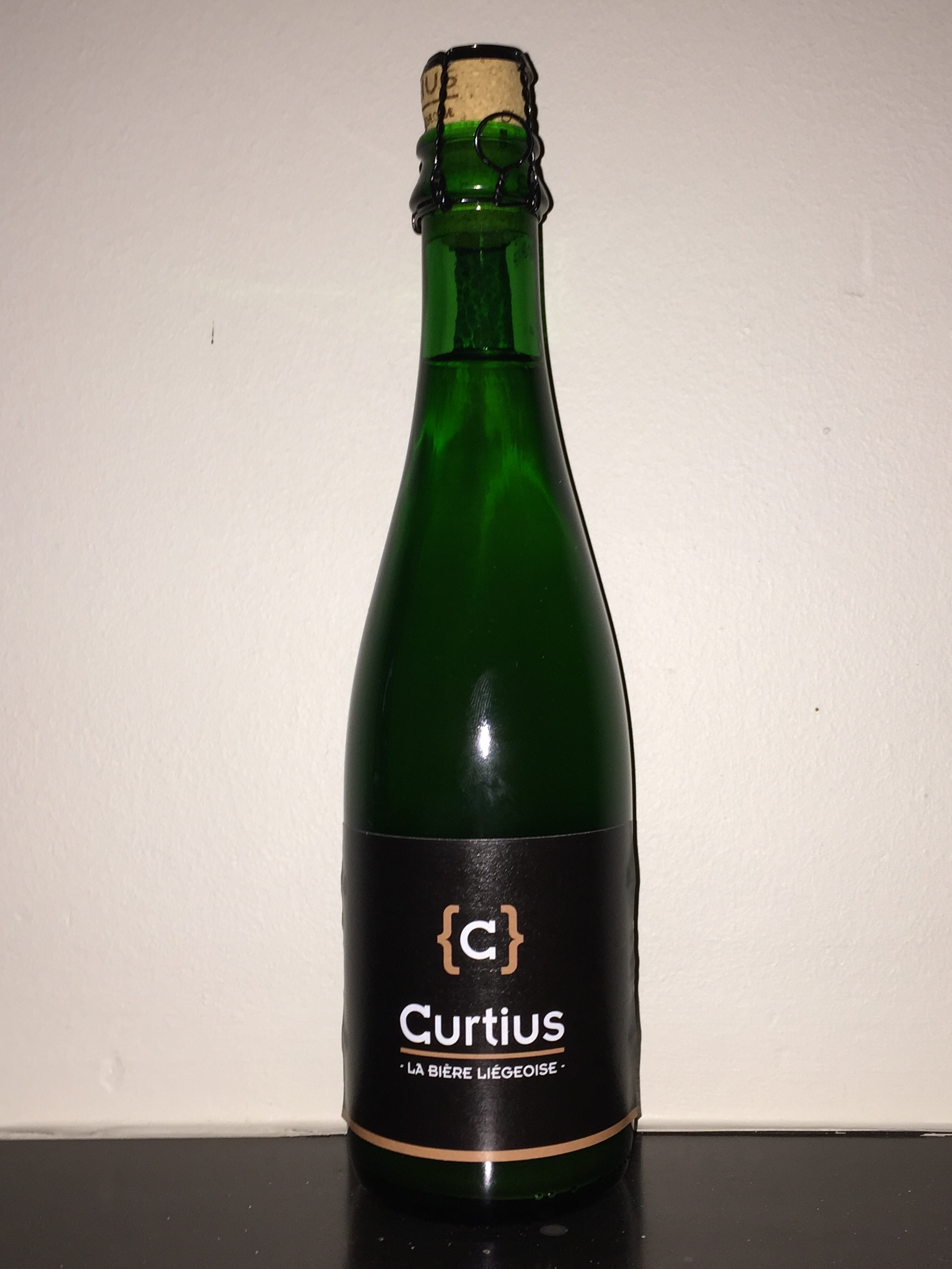
Curtius lager

Curtius is a Belgian beer brewed at the C Brewery, Microbrewery of the Principality, in Liège, Belgium. Its logo is the letter C between two braces.

== Characteristics ==
It is a lager with an alcohol content of 7% brewed from high-quality ingredients, with a light and refreshing taste. The brew contains the malt of both barley and wheat. Its body is refreshingly light while the aromatic hop blend gives it a subtle bitter taste with flowery and fruity notes. Best served between 6 °C and 8 °C, while avoiding to pour the beer at the bottom of the bottle.

It is available in bottles (37.5 cl) and kegs.

== History ==
Renaud Pirotte and François Dethier decided to create a Liège beer during their agri-food studies. Winners of the first edition of the TV programme "Starter", produced by the Belgian channel RTBF, both businessmen were able to realise their project and bought an industrial space, right in the historic heart of Liège, in the impasse des Ursulines, below the montagne de Bueren. In January 2013, they were selected as "Liège businessmen of the year 2012" (Managers liègeois de l'année 2012).
