= Alexander Curtius =

Lithuanian nobleman and scholar

Alexander Carolus Curtius (Lithuanian: Aleksandras Karolis Kuršius) was a Lithuanian nobleman and scholar purported to be the first Lithuanian immigrant to the New World. He founded the first Latin school in New Amsterdam in 1659 and became its headmaster. Due to disputes over salary (Curtius was paid too little by the Dutch of New Netherland) and disciplinary problems, he returned to Holland in 1661.
