= Christian Krypper =

Archbishop of Passau (1570-1573)

Most Reverend Christian Krypper
- Auxiliary Bishop of Passau; Titular Bishop of Symbalia
- Church: Catholic Church
- Diocese: Diocese of Passau
- In office: 1570–1573

Personal details
- Died: 12 November 1573 Passau, Germany

Christian Krypper (died 1573) was a Roman Catholic prelate who served as Auxiliary Bishop of Passau (1570–1573).

On 8 November 1570, Christian Krypper was appointed during the papacy of Pope Pius V as Auxiliary Bishop of Passau and Titular Bishop of Symbalia. He served as Auxiliary Bishop of Passau until his death on 12 Nov 1573.

== See also ==
- Catholic Church in Germany
