= Erasmus Pagendorfer =

Most Reverend Erasmus Pagendorfer
- Auxiliary Bishop of Passau; Titular Bishop of Symbalia
- Church: Catholic Church
- Diocese: Diocese of Passau
- In office: 1557–1561

Orders
- Consecration: 25 Jul 1558 by Urban Sagstetter

Personal details
- Died: 15 July 1561 Passau, Germany

Erasmus Pagendorfer (died 1561) was a Roman Catholic prelate who served as Auxiliary Bishop of Passau (1557–1561) and Titular Bishop of Symbalia.

== Biography ==
On 24 Mar 1557, Erasmus Pagendorfer was appointed during the papacy of Pope Paul IV as Auxiliary Bishop of Passau and Titular Bishop of Symbalia. On 25 Jul 1558, he was consecrated bishop by Urban Sagstetter, Bishop of Gurk. He served as Auxiliary Bishop of Passau until his death on 15 Jul 1561.

== See also ==
- Catholic Church in Germany
