= Christoph Weilhamer =

German Roman Catholic prelate

Most Reverend Christoph Weilhamer
- Auxiliary Bishop of Passau; Titular Bishop of Symbalia
- Church: Catholic Church
- Diocese: Diocese of Passau
- In office: 1589–1597

Orders
- Ordination: 1578

Personal details
- Born: 1547 Landshut, Germany
- Died: 22 May 1597 (age 50) Passau, Germany

Christoph Weilhamer (1547–1597) was a Roman Catholic prelate who served as Auxiliary Bishop of Passau (1589–1597).

== Biography ==
Christoph Weilhamer was born in Landshut, Germany in 1547 and ordained a priest in 1578. On 9 Oct 1589, he was appointed during the papacy of Pope Sixtus V as Auxiliary Bishop of Passau and Titular Bishop of Symbalia. He served as Auxiliary Bishop of Passau until his death on 22 May 1597.
