= Blasius Laubich =

Most Reverend Blasius Laubich
- Auxiliary Bishop of Passau; Titular Bishop of Symbalia
- Church: Catholic Church
- Diocese: Diocese of Passau
- In office: 1604–1608

Orders
- Consecration: 4 Dec 1604 by Wolfgang von Hausen

Personal details
- Died: 5 February 1608 Passau, Germany

Blasius Laubich (died 1608) was a Roman Catholic prelate who served as Auxiliary Bishop of Passau (1604–1608).

== Biography ==
On 24 Nov 1604, Blasius Laubich was appointed during the papacy of Pope Clement VIII as Auxiliary Bishop of Passau and Titular Bishop of Symbalia. On 4 Dec 1604, he was consecrated bishop by Wolfgang von Hausen, Bishop of Regensburg, with Bartholomäus Scholl, Auxiliary Bishop of Freising, and Marcus Lyresius, Auxiliary Bishop of Eichstätt, serving as co-consecrators. He served as Auxiliary Bishop of Passau until his death on 5 Feb 1608.
