= Maxine Kurtz =

American city planner

Maxine Kurtz (October 17, 1921 – November 4, 2008 ) was an American city planner.

When Kurtz became the director of the Denver Planning Office in 1947, she became the first woman to direct the planning department of a major American city. Kurtz is also known for persuading the government of Denver and its neighboring suburbs to enter a historic water sharing agreement in return for concessions in sanitation, zoning and building.

Kurtz was the author of two books about her experiences in city planning and human rights:

- Invisible Cage, A Memoir (2005)
- City of Destiny: Denver in the Making, with Ralph Conant
