= Hector Wegmann =

German Roman Catholic prelate

Most Reverend Hector Wegmann
- Auxiliary Bishop of Passau; Titular Bishop of Symbalia
- Church: Catholic Church
- Diocese: Diocese of Passau
- In office: 1575–1589

Personal details
- Died: 31 January 1589 Passau, Germany

Hector Wegmann (died 1589) was a Roman Catholic prelate who served as Auxiliary Bishop of Passau (1575–1589).

== Biography ==
On 4 Jul 1575, Hector Wegmann was appointed during the papacy of Pope Gregory XIII as Auxiliary Bishop of Passau and Titular Bishop of Symbalia. He served as Auxiliary Bishop of Passau until his death on 31 Jan 1589.

== See also ==
- Catholic Church in Germany
