= Sanne Kurz =

German cinematographer

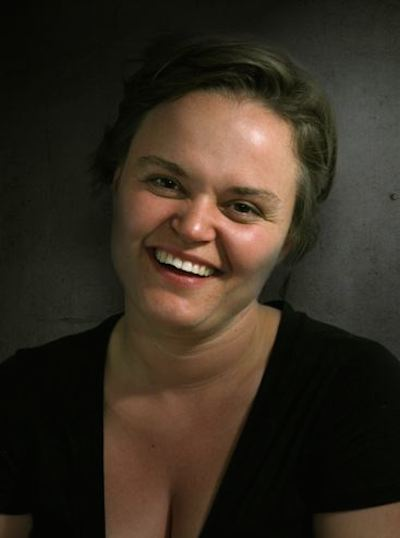
- Sanne Kurz in 2017.
- Born: 1 October 1974 (age 50); Ludwigshafen, West Germany
- Other names: Susanne Kurz
- Occupation(s): Cinematographer, photographer, filmmaker

Sanne Kurz; also Susanne Kurz (born 1 October 1974, in Ludwigshafen) is a German cinematographer.

== Life ==
In 1995 Kurz studied documentary film and cinematography at the University of Television and Film Munich, and in 1999–2000 camera/light at the Netherlands Film and Television Academy.

She has worked as a cinematographer for independent film, cinema documentary and commercials, and has collaborated with directors such as Satu Siegemund, Cheryl Dunye and Volker Goetze.

== Filmography ==
- 2007: The Line
- 2008: Coup de Grace
- 2009: The Band
- 2010: nicht weit von mir
- 2010: Mommy Is Coming

== Awards ==
- 2004: Civis media prize Europas Medienpreis für Integration|Young Civis for Himmelfilm – How were skies when you were young?
- 2009: National Competition for Women DoPs with 1, 2, 3
