= Bernhard Meurl von Leombach =

Most Reverend Andreas Weinmair
- Auxiliary Bishop of Passau; Titular Bishop of Libariensis
- Church: Catholic Church
- Diocese: Diocese of Passau
- In office: 1496–1526

Personal details
- Born: 1452
- Died: 27 Jan 1526 (age 74) Passau, Germany

Bernhard Meurl von Leombach (died 1526) was a Roman Catholic prelate who served as Auxiliary Bishop of Passau (1496–1526).

== Biography ==
Bernhard Meurl von Leombach was born in 1452. On 4 May 1496, he was appointed during the papacy of Pope Alexander VI as Auxiliary Bishop of Passau and Titular Bishop cof Libariensis. He served as Auxiliary Bishop of Passau until his death on 27 Jan 1526. While bishop, he was the principal co-consecrator of Berthold Pürstinger, Bishop of Chiemsee (1508).
