= Kurz (disambiguation) =

Kurz is a German-language surname. Kurz may also refer to:

== Firearms ==
- Karabiner 98 Kurz, rifle
- Pointe Kurz, mountain on the border between France and Switzerland
- Schützenpanzer SPz 11-2 Kurz, armored vehicle
- Walther PP Kurz, pistol series
- 9 mm Kurz, pistol cartridge
- 7.92×33mm Kurz, rifle cartridge

== Persons ==
- Kurz ibn Jabir al-Fihri, companion of Muhammad
- Kurz Weber, fictional character from Japanese Full Metal Panic! light novel series
