= Philipp von Daun zu Sassenheim und Callenborn =

German prelate of the Roman Catholic Church

The Most Reverend Philipp Wirich Lorenz von Daun zu Sassenheim und Callenborn
- Auxiliary Bishop of Passau
- Appointed: 3 January 1757

Orders
- Ordination: 10 August 1755
- Consecration: 20 February 1757 by Bishop Joseph Dominikus von Lamberg; Bishop Leopold Ernst von Firmian; Bishop Vigilius Augustin Maria von Firmian

Personal details
- Born: 11 June 1720 Vienna, Holy Roman Empire
- Died: 20 November 1763 (aged 43)

Philipp Wirich Lorenz von Daun zu Sassenheim und Callenborn (11 June 1720 – 20 November 1763) was a German prelate of the Roman Catholic Church. He served as Auxiliary Bishop of Passau from 1757 until his death in 1763.

== Biography ==
=== Early life and priesthood ===
Von Daun zu Sassenheim und Callenborn was born on 11 June 1720 in Vienna, then the de facto capital of the Holy Roman Empire. He was ordained a deacon of the Diocese of Passau on 31 May 1749, and was ordained a priest on 10 August 1755.

=== Episcopacy ===
On 3 January 1757, he was appointed Auxiliary Bishop of Passau, and Titular Bishop of Tium. He was consecrated to the episcopacy on 20 February 1757, with Bishop Joseph Dominikus von Lamberg serving as the principal consecrator, and Bishops Leopold Ernst von Firmian and Vigilius Augustin Maria von Firmian co-consecrating.

He died on 20 November 1763, at the age of 43.

== Episcopal lineage ==
- Cardinal Guillaume d'Estouteville
- Pope Sixtus IV (1471)
- Pope Julius II (1481)
- Cardinal Raffaele Riario (1504)
- Pope Leo X (1513)
- Cardinal Alessandro Farnese (1519)
- Cardinal Francesco Pisani (1527)
- Cardinal Alfonso Gesualdo (1564)
- Pope Clement VIII (1592)
- Cardinal Pietro Aldobrandini (1604)
- Bishop Laudivio Zacchia (1605)
- Cardinal Antonio Barberini, OFM Cap. (1625)
- Cardinal Marco Antonio Franciotti (1637)
- Archbishop Antonio Pignatelli del Rastrello (1652)
- Cardinal Leopold Karl von Kollonitsch (1688)
- Cardinal Johann Philipp von Lamberg (1690)
- Archbishop Franz Anton von Harrach zu Rorau (1702)
- Cardinal Joseph Dominikus von Lamberg (1712)
- Bishop Philipp von Daun zu Sassenheim und Callenborn (1757)

== See also ==
- Catholic Church in Germany
