= Andreas Weinmair =

Most Reverend Andreas Weinmair
- Auxiliary Bishop of Passau; Titular Bishop of Constantia in Arabia
- Church: Catholic Church
- Diocese: Diocese of Passau
- In office: 1477–1491

Orders
- Consecration: 28 Sep 1477

Personal details
- Died: 1491 Passau, Germany

Andreas Weinmair (died 1491) was a Roman Catholic prelate who served as Auxiliary Bishop of Passau (1477–1491).

== Biography ==
In 1477, Andreas Weinmair was appointed during the papacy of Pope Sixtus IV as Auxiliary Bishop of Passau and Titular Bishop of Constantia in Arabia. On 28 Sep 1477, he was consecrated bishop. He served as Auxiliary Bishop of Passau until his death in 1491.
