= Karl Friedrich Kurz =

German writer (1878–1962)

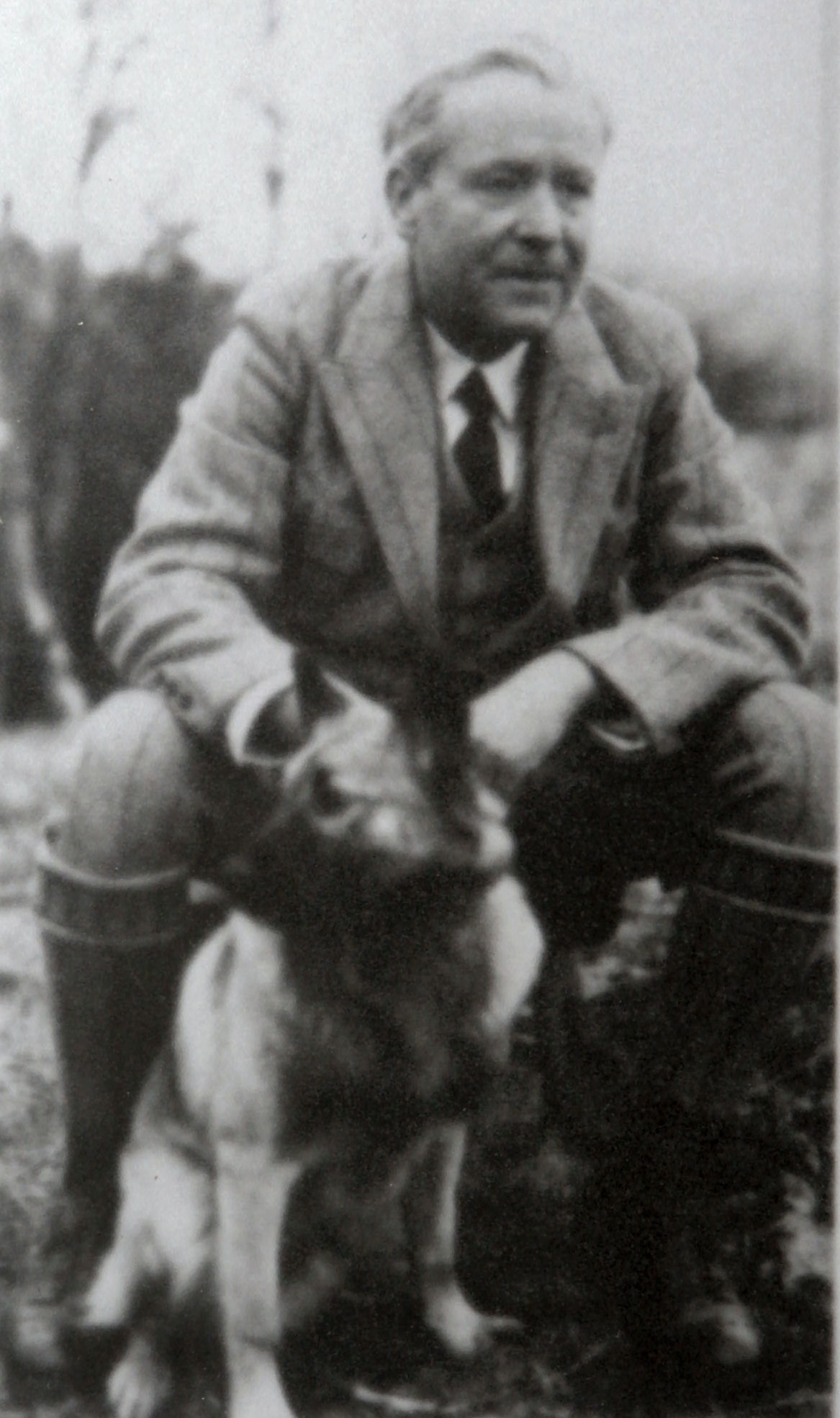
- Born: 22 September 1878; Freiburg, Germany
- Died: 26 June 1962 (aged 83); Fjell Municipality, Norway
- Resting place: Holmedal, Norway
- Occupation: novelist
- Writing career
- Language: German

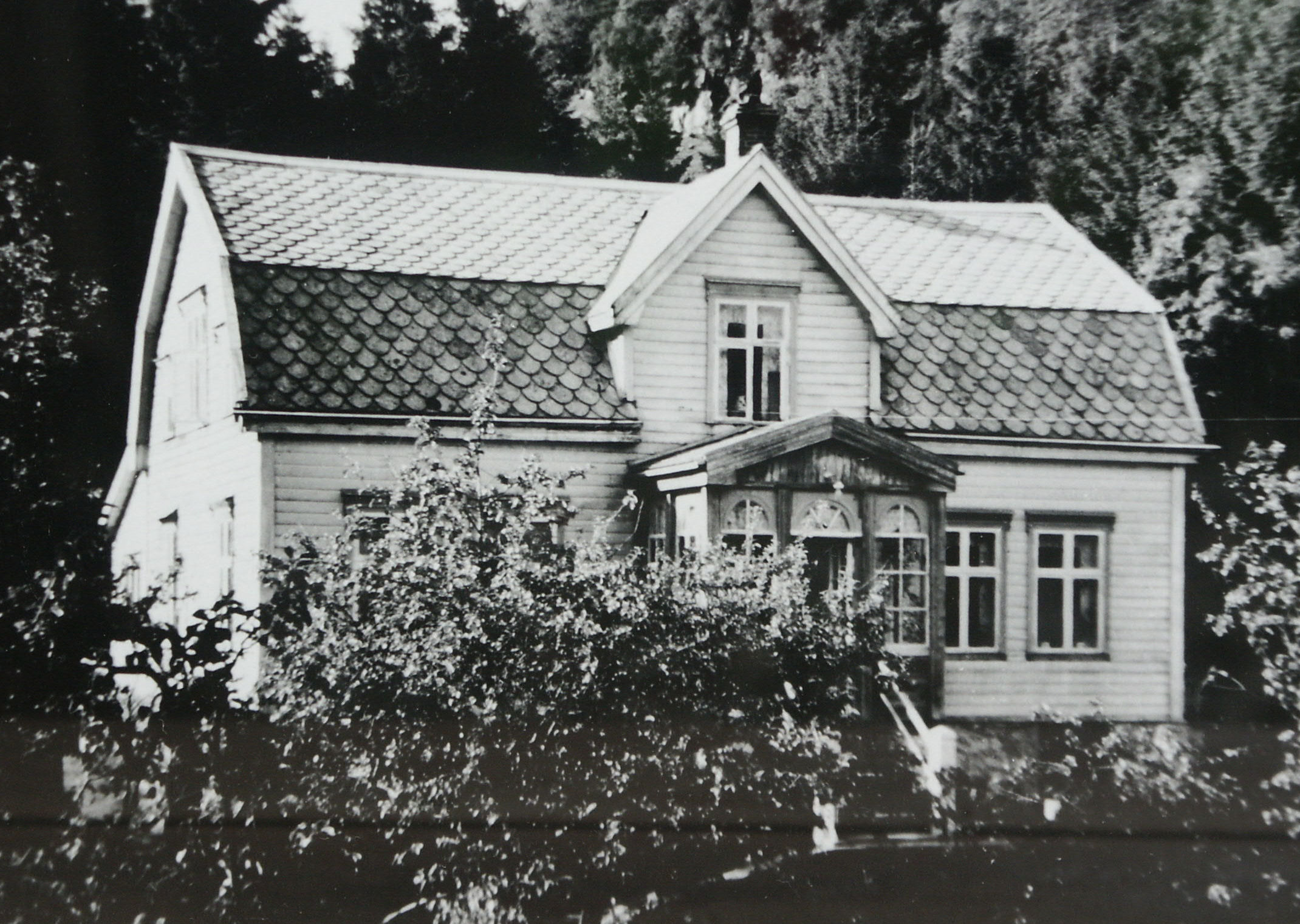
The residence of Karl Friedrich Kurz, Vårdal, Dalsfjorden, Sunnfjord.

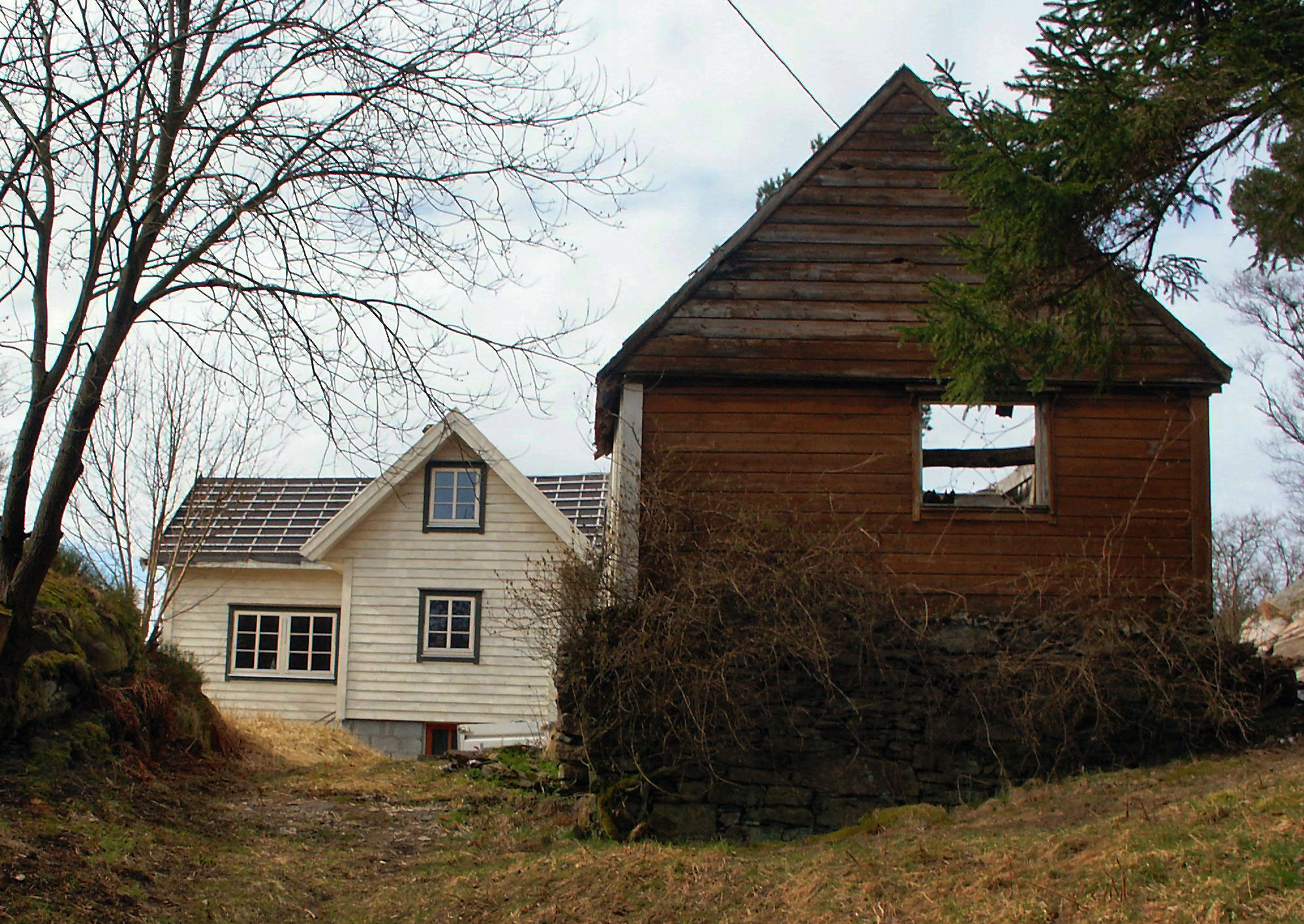
The residence of Karl Friedrich Kurz, Nessjøen, Fjell Kommune, Sotra. The house is now restored and has become a vacation home. The papers he left behind was kept in the barn which dilapidated after his death in 1962

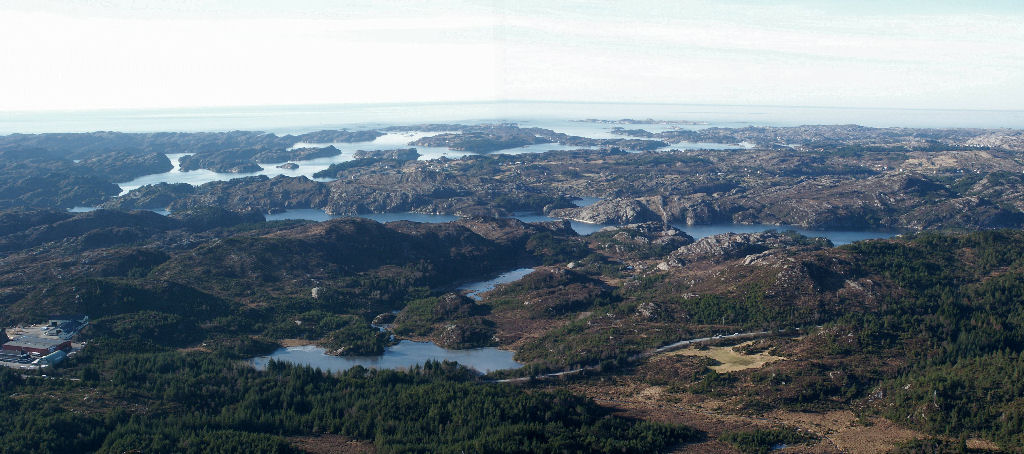
Panorama from Liatårnet mountain on Sotra towards Nessjøen (left in the background) where Karl Friedrich Kurz lived his last twelve years.

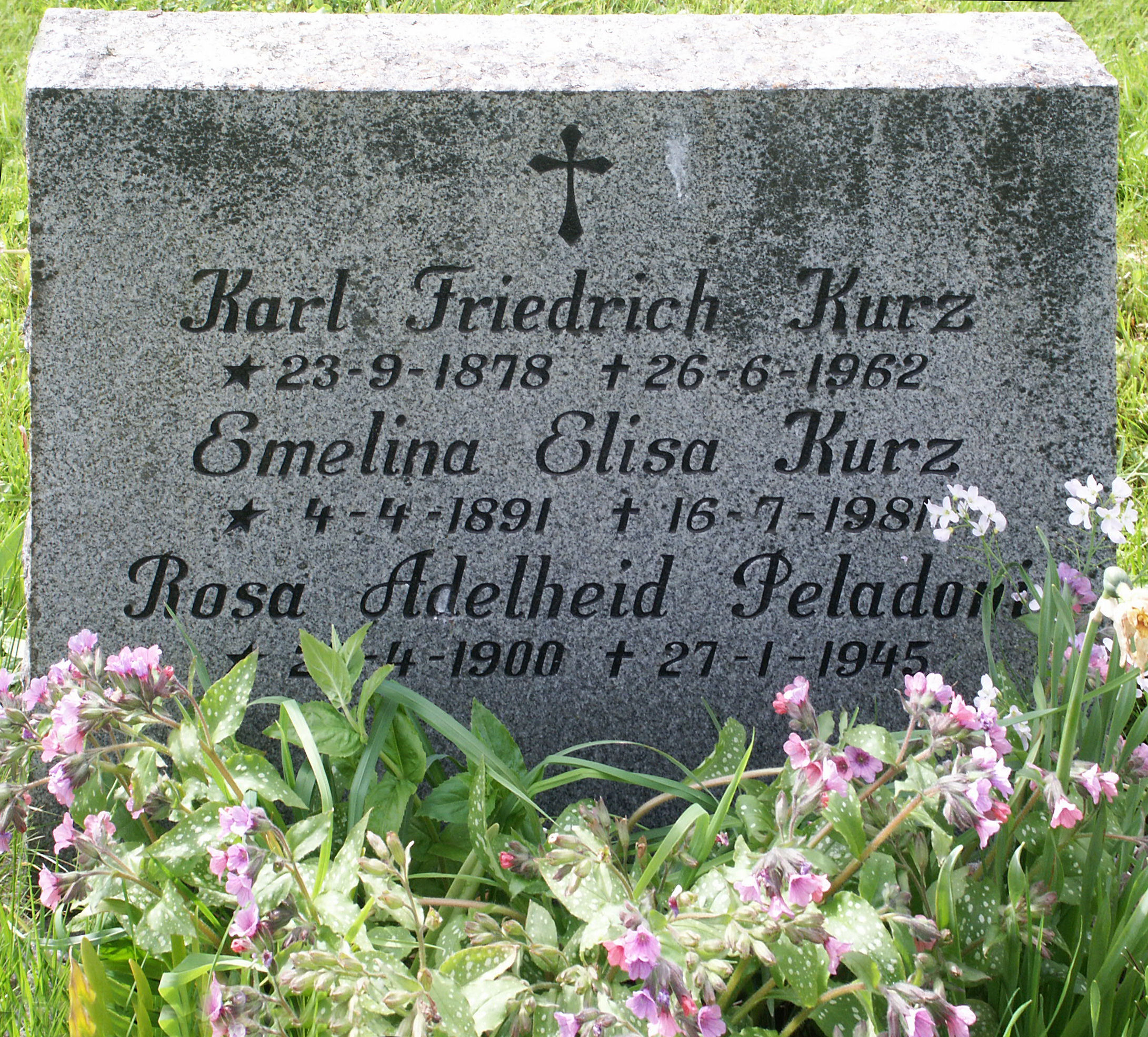
The tomb of Karl Friedrich Kurz, Holmedal, Dalsfjorden, Sunnfjord. His spouse Emeliana and her sister Rosa Adelheid Peladoni is buried close nearby.

Karl Friedrich Kurz (23 September 1878 – 26 June 1962) was a Swiss/German/Norwegian novelist.

Kurz was born near Freiburg, Bremgarten, Markgräflerland in Germany. As a child he moved with his parents to Basel in Switzerland. He wanted to be a painter and entered the academy in Karlsruhe.

Coincidences made him a writer. He led a vagrant life with an extensive travelling activity in among others East Asia and Japan before he settled in Norway where he wrote novels in German. He was influenced by Knut Hamsun and got inspiration from the nature and folk life in the fjords of Sogn and Sunnfjord.

His novels enjoyed great popularity in Germany and were sold in great numbers. In 1934 he was awarded the Großer Schillerpreis by the Schweizerischen Schillerstiftung in Zürich.

He first lived in Solund Municipality, then near Vadheim in Lavik Municipality. In 1924, he settled in Vårdal along the Dalsfjorden in Sunnfjord. He lived there until he in 1950 left his family and moved to Nessjøen in Fjell Municipality on the island of Sotra in Hordaland where he lived until his death in 1962, at 84 years of age.

The papers he left behind when he died are mostly lost.

Karl Friedrich Kurz is buried at the churchyard at Holmedal Church along the Dalsfjorden in Sunnfjord.

== Novels ==
Ten novels and a number of short stories. Among others:

- Vom Nil zum Fujijama, (1910, his first book).
- Kohana. Japanisches Liebesidyll. Huber. Frauenfeld and Leipzig (1910).
- Mitternachtsonne und Nordlicht, (1914).
- Herren vom Fjord, Westermann (1947) (Norwegian translation by Heidi Helle and Rolf Losnegård: Herskap ved fjorden, - ISBN 978-82-7959-033-0)
- Im Königreich Mjelvik, Westermann (1930).
- Tyra, die Märcheninsel, (1935).
- Der Sohn des Meeres, (1937).
- Ein gesegneter Lügner, (1938).
- Traum und Ziel , Dt. Buch-Gemeinschaft (1940) which gave him 1934 Grosser Schillerpreis der Schweizerischen Schillerstiftung.
- Herr Erlings Magd, Berlin (1936).
- Die Geisterkutsche, Westermann (1953)

== Sources ==
- Karl Friedrich Kurz: Herskap ved fjorden. Translation from German to Norwegian by Heidi Helle and Rolf Losnegård.
- Norvald Tveitt: Fra gull til grønne skoger - (From gold to green forests (about Erik Grant Lea)).
- Interviews with local people in Vårdal, Sunnfjord and Nessjøen, Sotra v/ Frode Inge Helland.
