= Benedikt Sibenhirter =

Most Reverend Benedikt Sibenhirter
- Auxiliary Bishop of Passau; Titular Bishop of Lydda
- Church: Catholic Church
- Diocese: Diocese of Passau
- In office: 1452–1458

Personal details
- Died: 10 May 1458 Passau, Germany

Benedikt Sibenhirter, O.S.B. (died 1458) was a Roman Catholic prelate who served as Auxiliary Bishop of Passau (1452–1458).

Sibenhirter was ordained a priest in the Order of Saint Benedict in 1428. On 20 Nov 1452, he was appointed during the papacy of Pope Nicholas V as Auxiliary Bishop of Passau and Titular Bishop of Lydda. He served as Auxiliary Bishop of Passau until his death on 10 May 1458.
