= Wolfgang Püchler =

Most Reverend Wolfgang Püchler
- Auxiliary Bishop of Passau; Titular Bishop of Hippos
- Church: Catholic Church
- Diocese: Diocese of Passau
- In office: 1465–1475

Personal details
- Died: 23 July 1475 Passau, Germany

Wolfgang Püchler, O.F.M. (died 1475) was a Roman Catholic prelate who served as Auxiliary Bishop of Passau (1465–1475).

== Biography ==
Wolfgang Püchler was ordained a priest in the Order of Friars Minor. In 1465, he was appointed during the papacy of Pope Paul II as Auxiliary Bishop of Passau and Titular Bishop of Hippos. He served as Auxiliary Bishop of Passau until his death on 23 Jul 1475.
