= Ryan Kurtzer =

Ryan Kurtzer (born in Suffolk, England), is an International Baseball player who plays for the Great Britain national baseball team. He is the first and only GB baseball player to play at all levels (Juveniles, Cadets and Juniors) while not residing in Britain.

== 2004 ==
Kurtzer represented Great Britain in the 2nd annual Kenko International Tournament that was held in Nettuno, Italy. During this tournament he was the only Great Britain Juvenile catcher to throw a runner out who attempted to steal and was tied on the team for the most hits for the tournament.

== 2006 ==
Kurtzer represented Great Britain at the Cadet level in the 4th annual Kenko International Tournament that was held in Rho, Italy. During this tournament he was the winning pitcher when his team beat the national team from Slovenia 7-4. Kurtzer pitched six of the seven innings, giving up three earned runs and striking out five. Slovenia beat Ryan's Great Britain team earlier in the tournament by a score of 12-3 and later in the tournament by a score of 21-9.

== 2007 ==
Kurtzer played in the European Championship Cadet Qualifier that was held in Calabria, Italy ^{[usurped]}. He posted the second highest batting average for the tournament at .467. He also finished fourth in slugging percentage (.533), seventh in on-base percentage (.500), tied for fourth in hits (7) and tied for sixth in total bases (8). All of these were Great Britain team highs for the tournament. (July 2009) - Two players from this tournament have signed with MLB teams: Italian Luca Martone (Cincinnati Reds) and Lithuanian Dovydas Neverauskas (Pittsburgh Pirates).

== 2008 ==
Kurtzer played in the European Championship Cadet Qualifier held in Antalya, Turkey ^{[usurped]} and led the Great Britain team to the Championship against Ukraine and Great Britain's highest finish ever, a Silver Medal. He batted .353 with one home run (hit against Ukraine), scored nine runs and had five stolen bases. He was the only British player to hit safely in all five games.

While pitching he earned the only save of the tournament in a one run game against eventual third-place finisher Romania where he came on in the 8th (extra) inning and struck out three. Kurtzer also pitched three innings against the national team from Bulgaria where he gave up one hit, did not allow a run and struck out seven. At the plate against Turkey he was 2-for-3, scored four runs, had three RBIs and had two stolen bases. His ground-rule double in the 4th inning easily cleared the right field fence.

Kurtzer finished the tournament tied for first in runs scored (9), tied for second in doubles (2), tied for second in home runs (1), tied for third in total bases (11), fourth in slugging percentage (.647), tied for fifth in hits (6). His pitching stats were tied for first in ERA (0.00), first in saves (1), and tied for fifth in batters stuck out (10) in four innings pitched.

== 2010 ==
Kurtzer played in the European Championship Junior Qualifier held in Attnang-Puchheim, Austria. He batted .350 with four doubles. In one appearance on the mound he faced Bulgaria for 4.1 innings and struck out four.

After a slow start, Kurtzer finished the tournament in 13th place in batting average (.350), second in doubles (4), fourth in hits (7), fourth in total bases (11) and second in two-out RBIs (4). Kurtzer's hit and double totals were Great Britain team highs while his total bases were second on the team.

NOTE: Five European based players at this tournament were selected to attend the 2010 MLB Academy in Italy. The MLB Academy in Italy is for the 50 best European baseball players aged 15–19 who reside in Europe.

== Notables ==
- 2008 - Member of Freshman HS Conference Championship team (scored winning run that clinched the Championship)
- 2008 - Member of Great Britain Silver Medal team at European Cadet Championship Qualifier
- 2008 - Member of Colt team that was runner-up
- 2008 - Member of Fall Wood Bat League Championship team run by the Chicago White Sox Academy
- 2008 - Tied for 3rd in first ever 16-18U Cangelosi Baseball Winter Indoor Hitting League as a 15-y/o
- 2009 - Member of Chicago White Sox Academy 16U Elite Baseball team (Hit .500 at 2009 17U Triple Crown Summer Nationals Tournament)
- 2009 - Member of HS Sophomore Baseball team
- 2009 - Member of HS Varsity summer baseball team that reached Elite 8 in the Illinois Summer State Finals (4A)
- 2009 - Member of Great Britain Junior National Baseball Team pool-of-players (no European tournament scheduled)
- 2010 - Member of HS Varsity Baseball team that won the Regional Championship and reached the Sectional Championship
- 2010 - Member of Chicago White Sox Academy 17U Elite Baseball team
- 2010 - Member of HS Varsity summer baseball team that reached the Regional Semi-Finals
- 2010 - Member of Great Britain Junior National Baseball Team
- 2010 - Member of HS Varsity summer baseball team (played "phenomenal" in the playoffs, had two hits and scored two runs against eventual Summer League State Champion - Nazareth HS in the playoffs) Wednesday Journal Sports Section
- 2010 - Member of Cangelosi Baseball Fall Elite Baseball team coached by former World Series Champion John Cangelosi

== National Team Opponents ==
Austria, Belgium, Bulgaria, Canada, Hungary, Italy, Lithuania, Poland, Romania, San Marino, Slovenia, Switzerland, Turkey and Ukraine

== Coaches ==
- Sam Dempster: Current Milwaukee Brewers scout, Canadian College Baseball Head Coach, Great Britain Senior National Team Head Coach and 2007 MLB Envoy of the Year
- Ingo Gottwald: Hungarian Senior National Baseball Team Head Coach
- Will Lintern: Current Great Britain Senior National Baseball Team member, Great Britain Junior/Cadet National Team Head Coach, International and former US College (Menlo) player
- Adam Roberts: Former Great Britain Senior National Baseball Team and International player
- Paul Vernon: Great Britain Junior National Baseball Team Head Coach
