= Jacob Kurz von Senftenau =

Jacob Kurz von Senftenau (1554 – 11 March 1594) (sometimes spelled as Kurtz, Latinized name: Jacob Curtius, Czech: Jakub Kurz ze Senftenavy) was the Imperial pro-chancellor (Reichsvizekanzler) for the Emperor Rudolph II. In addition to high politics he was also a contact between the Emperor and contemporary scholars, notably the astronomer Tycho Brahe.

Jacob Kurz was born to a noble family whose many members filled high governmental position for the Habsburgs during the 16th and 17th century (Senftenau is name of a castle in Lindau, Bavaria bought by Jacob's father). He was given a good education that included natural sciences. From 1579 to 1586 he served in the Reichshofrat, from 1585 to 1594 in the Geheimer Rat, from 1587 to 1593 as Reichsvizekanzler Amtsverwalter (Imperial pro-chancellor office manager), and from 1593 to 1594 as Reichsvizekanzler (Imperial pro-chancellor).

Kurz, as a high official at the Imperial court in Prague, built a splendid house near the Prague Castle.

Kurz organized the move of Danish astronomer Tycho Brahe to Prague, and designed a quadrant for him. Brahe arrived in 1594 and was offered Kurz's house to live in. Brahe died there in 1601, and the house was later occupied by Kepler.

Jacob Kurz died during a smallpox epidemic in Prague and was interred in St. Thomas Church in Josefská street, Prague.
