= Heinrich Kurz =

Most Reverend Heinrich Kurz
- Auxiliary Bishop of Passau; Titular Bishop of Chrysopolis
- Church: Catholic Church
- Diocese: Diocese of Passau
- In office: 1526–1557

Personal details
- Died: 21 July 1557 Passau, Germany

Heinrich Kurz (died 1557) was a Roman Catholic prelate who served as Auxiliary Bishop of Passau (1526–1557).

== Biography ==
On 14 Mar 1526, Heinrich Kurz was appointed during the papacy of Pope Clement VII as Auxiliary Bishop of Passau and Titular Bishop of Chrysopolis. He served as Auxiliary Bishop of Passau until his death on 21 Jul 1557.
