= Isolde Kurz =

German poet and short story writer (1853–1944)

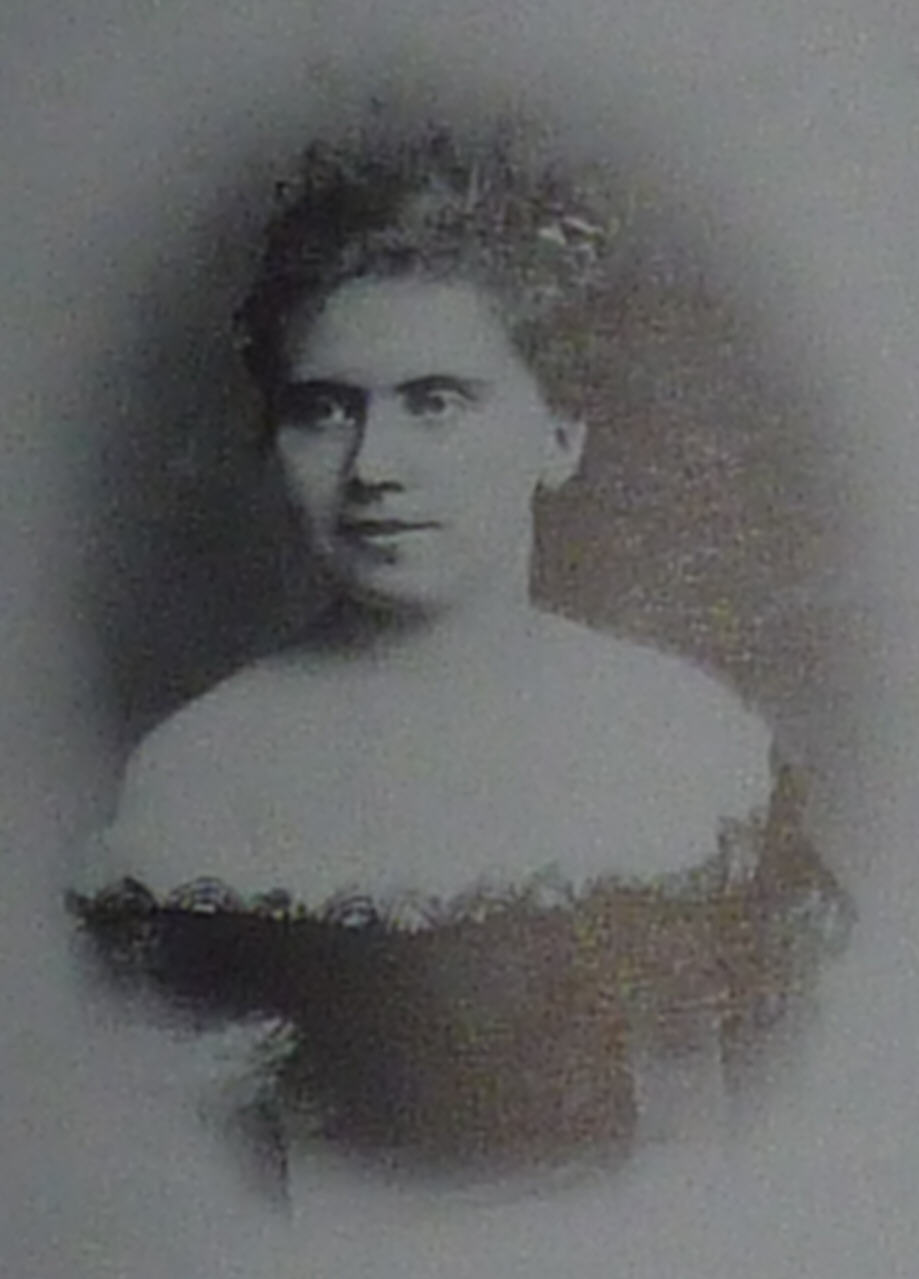
Isolde Kurz.

Maria Clara Isolde Kurz (21 December 1853 – 5 April 1944) was a German poet and short story writer.

She was born in Stuttgart, the daughter of Hermann Kurz. She is highly regarded among lyric poets in Germany for her Gedichte (Stuttgart, 1888) and Neue Gedichte (1903). Her short stories, Florentiner Novellen (1890, 2nd ed. 1893), Phantasien und Märchen (1890), Italienische Erzählungen (1895) and Von Dazumal (1900) are distinguished by a fine sense of form and clear-cut style.
