= Kurtzer =

Kurtzer is a German and Jewish surname. Notable people with the surname include:

- Daniel C. Kurtzer (born 1949), American ambassador
- Yehuda Kurtzer (born 1977), American Jewish public intellectual
- Ryan Kurtzer, English baseball player
- Edda Blanck-Kurtzer, known as Molly Luft
