= Hermann Kurz =

German poet and novelist (1813–1873)

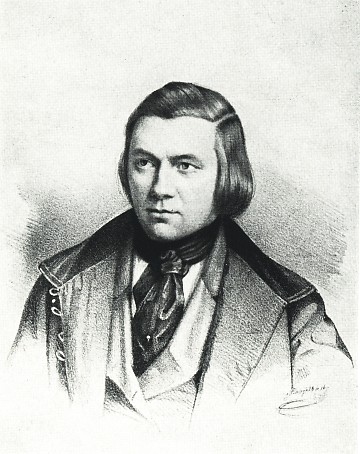
Hermann Kurz (1843)

Hermann Kurz (30 November 1813 – 10 October 1873) was a German poet and novelist.

He was born at Reutlingen. Having studied at the theological seminary at Maulbronn and at the University of Tübingen, he became assistant pastor at Ehningen. He then entered upon a literary career and lived in Stuttgart. In 1863 he was appointed university librarian at Tübingen, where he remained until his death there.

Kurz's collections of poems, Gedichte (1836) and Dichtungen (1839), were less successful than his historical novels, Schiller's Heimatjahre (1843) and Der Sonnenwirt (1854), and his excellent translations from English, Italian and Spanish. He also published a successful modern German version of Gottfried von Strassburg's Tristan and Iseult (1844). His collected works were published in ten volumes (Stuttgart, 1874).

His daughter, Isolde Kurz, was also a poet.
